= San Diego-Scripps Coastal Marine Conservation Area =

Marine protected areas on California's coast

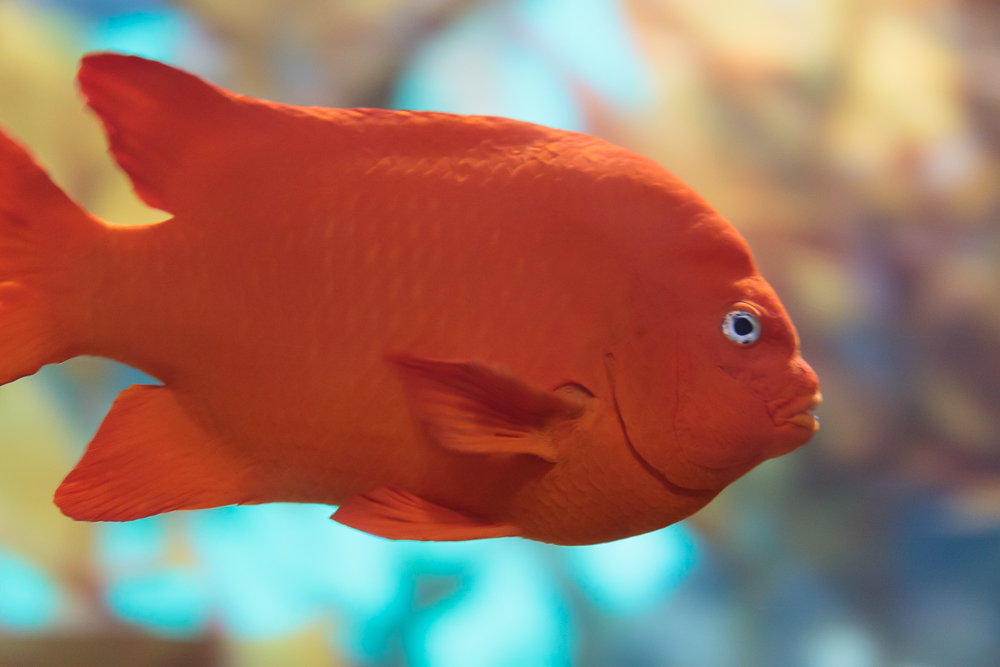
Hypsypops rubicundus, popularly known as Garibaldi or Catalina goldfish

San Diego-Scripps Coastal Marine Conservation Area (SMCA) and Matlahuayl State Marine Reserve (SMR) are adjoining marine protected areas that extend offshore from La Jolla in San Diego County on California's south coast. The two marine protected areas cover 2.51 square miles (6.5 km^{2}).

== History ==
The origins of the marine reserve date back to 1929 when the state of California set aside a "marine life refuge" to protect the submerged and intertidal area near Scripps Institution of Oceanography. In 1957, the nearshore area became part of the San Diego Marine Life Refuge.

Environmental activism led to the creation of the adjacent San Diego-La Jolla Underwater Park to prevent over-fishing. In 1970, the City of San Diego incorporated the San Diego-La Jolla Underwater Park that stretched more than 2 miles (3.2 km) offshore. Responsibility for maintenance was to be shared by the City of San Diego's Department of Parks and Recreation and the California Department of Fish and Game. A 514-acre ecological reserve and marine life refuge was created at the same time, known as the "Look, Don't Touch Ecological Reserve." In 1981, the San Diego City Council extended the boundaries of the ecological reserve to include La Jolla Cove.

The passage of California's Marine Life Protection Act (1999) led to the creation of the San Diego-Scripps Coastal State Marine Conservation Area (SMCA) and the Matlahuayl State Marine Reserve (SMR).

== Marine Life Protection Act (1999) ==
California was the first state in the United States to establish a system of Marine Protected Areas (MPAs)—like national parks and forests—to protect and restore ocean habitats and ocean ecosystems. The 1999 California Marine Life Protection Act (MLPA) divided the state into five regions: the north coast, north central coast, central coast, south coast, and San Francisco Bay. In 2012, over 120 underwater refuges were created along California's coast.

The goals that guided the planning process were:

- Protect the natural diversity and abundance of marine life, and the structure, function and integrity of marine ecosystems.
- Help sustain, conserve and protect marine life populations, including those of economic value, and rebuild those that are depleted.
- Improve recreational, educational and study opportunities provided by marine ecosystems that are subject to minimal human disturbance, and to manage these uses in a manner consistent with protecting biodiversity.
- Protect marine natural heritage, including protection of representative and unique marine life habitats in CA waters for their intrinsic values.
- Ensure California's MPAs have clearly defined objectives, effective management measures and adequate enforcement and are based on sound scientific guidelines.
- Ensure the State's MPAs are designed and managed, to the extent possible, as a network.

To achieve these goals, the following designations were created:

- State Marine Reserves (SMR) restrict all commercial and recreational activities
- State Marine Conservation Areas (SMCA) have specific goals for conservation
- State Marine Parks (SMP) allow opportunities for education, research, and recreation while preventing commercial extractive activities
- State Marine Recreational Management Area (SMRMA) protect certain recreational activities
- Special Closures prohibit access or boating activities adjacent to sea bird rookeries or marine mammal haul-out sites (restrictions vary).

The Marine Protected Areas in San Diego County are:

- San Dieguito Lagoon State Marine Conservation Area (SMCA)
- San Diego-Scripps Coastal State Marine Conservation Area (SMCA)
- Matlahuayl State Marine Reserve (SMR)
- South La Jolla State Marine Conservation Area (SMCA)
- South La Jolla State Marine Reserve (SMR)
- Famosa Slough State Marine Conservation Area (SMCA)
- Cabrillo State Marine Reserve (SMR) the Tijuana River Mouth State Marine Conservation Area (SMCA)

== San Diego-Scripps Coastal Marine Conservation Area ==
San Diego-Scripps Coastal SMCA encompasses an area that has been protected since 1929, known previously as the San Diego Marine Life Refuge. It protects most of the unique Scripps Canyon branch of La Jolla's submarine canyon system, as well as the marine life that thrives in the nutrient-rich water funneled to the surface from the canyon system. Opaleye, California halibut, and shovelnose guitarfish are among the many fish species that thrive here. The conservation area also protects the southernmost natural mussel bed in California.

=== Regulations ===
It is unlawful to injure, damage, take, or possess any living, geological, or cultural marine resource, EXCEPT: Recreational take of coastal pelagic species except market squid (northern anchovy, Pacific sardine, Pacific mackerel, and jack mackerel), by hook-and-line only is allowed. California Code of Regulations Title 141, Section 632(b)(14)

== Matlahuayl State Marine Reserve ==
Matlahuayl State Marine Reserve encompasses an area protected since 1970, previously known as the San Diego-La Jolla Underwater Park Ecological Reserve. It protects the reefs, kelp forests, surfgrass beds, and sandy sea floor at the head of La Jolla Submarine Canyon's southern branch. It shelters around a quarter square mile of submarine canyon habitat. The deepwater canyon funnels deep, cold, nutrient-rich waters into the reserve and surrounding area, helping to support an array of life. Kelp bass, leopard shark, and rock scallop are a few of the species that thrive in the marine protected reserve.

The name Matlahuayl was adopted in honor of the Kumeyaay, a local indigenous people. La Jolla was the location of a large habitation area known as Mut kula xuy (place of many caves). Spindrift, also called the La Jolla Complex, encompasses the parcel of coastal land along La Jolla Shores down to La Jolla Cove.

=== Regulations ===
It is unlawful to injure, damage, take, or possess any living, geological, or cultural marine resource. California Code of Regulations Title 141, Section 632(b)(14)

== Location ==
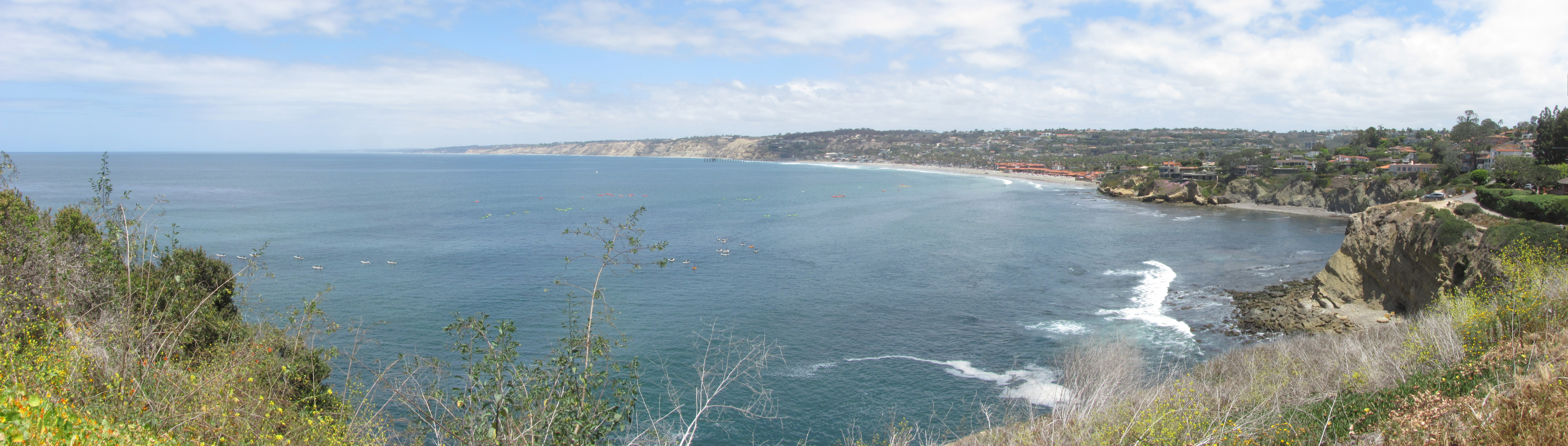
La Jolla Bay

San Diego-Scripps Coastal SMCA is bounded by the mean high tide line and straight lines connecting the following points in the order listed:

1. 32°53.000′N 117°15.166′W
2. 32°53.000′N 117°16.400′W
3. 32°51.964′N 117°16.400′W and
4. 32°51.964′N 117°15.233′W.

Matlahuayl SMR is bounded by the mean high tide line and straight lines connecting the following points in the order listed:

1. 32°51.964′N 117°15.233′W
2. 32°51.964′N 117°16.400′W and
3. 32°51.067′N 117°16.400′W.

== Habitat and wildlife ==
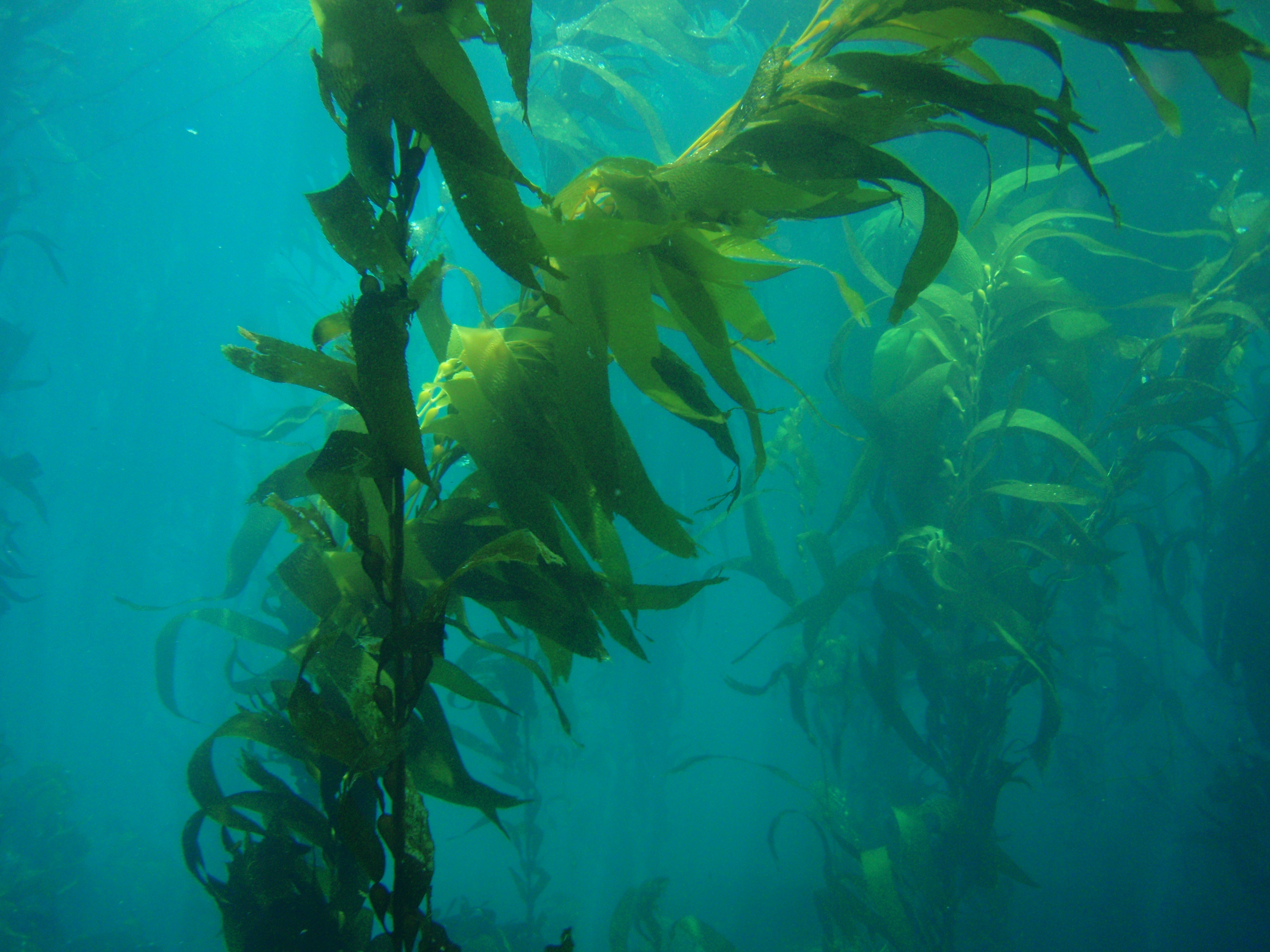
Giant Kelp

San Diego-Scripps Coastal SMCA and Matlahuayl SMR protect most of the unique Scripps Canyon branch of La Jolla's submarine canyon system and the southernmost natural California mussel bed. The area is a hotbed of biodiversity and sustains a thriving ecosystem. The areas encompass four distinct habitat zones; rocky reef, kelp forest, sandy flat, and deepwater canyon. In a study focused around the benefits of MPAs, it was found that throughout the La Jolla region, there were half of the known California fish species present. This study also found that 265 species spread across 95 families were found within these La Jolla adjacent MPAs.

== Recreation and nearby attractions ==
Nearby La Jolla Shores is one of San Diego's most popular beach going destinations. The long, wide stretch of sand provides plenty of room for families to picnic and build sand castles, set up volleyball nets, or a game of Frisbee. A vehicle friendly small boat and kayak launch is located at the end of Avenida De La Playa. Local companies offer tours that include kayaking, snorkeling, scuba diving, and trips though the famed sea caves beneath the cliffs. Recreational fishing from a kayak is especially popular just outside the protected areas. For a more tucked away experience, visitors can find Blacks Beach a little farther north along the coast.

The easy access makes La Jolla Cove a superb dive location. The abundant and healthy marine life and habitat here makes it a draw for beginners and experts alike. It is not uncommon for underwater visibility in the cove to exceed 30 feet. Visitors can expect to see an array of fish and sea birds, as well as sea lions, harbor seals, dolphins, and even the occasional sea turtle. The Cave Store sits along Coast Avenue with the a tunnel allowing guests to view the connected sea cave.

Children's Pool Beach (also known as Casa Beach), just to the south of La Jolla Cove, has become a famous haul-out and breeding spot for harbor seals, where they can be seen year-round basking on the shore. There are many tide pools in this vicinity to explore. Visitors can relax and picnic at Kellogg Park, a large grassy area adjacent to the beach with barbecue pits, a playground and restrooms.

Another area attraction is Birch Aquarium. The aquarium is associated with the world-renowned Scripps Institution of Oceanography and is open to the public.

== Public Art ==
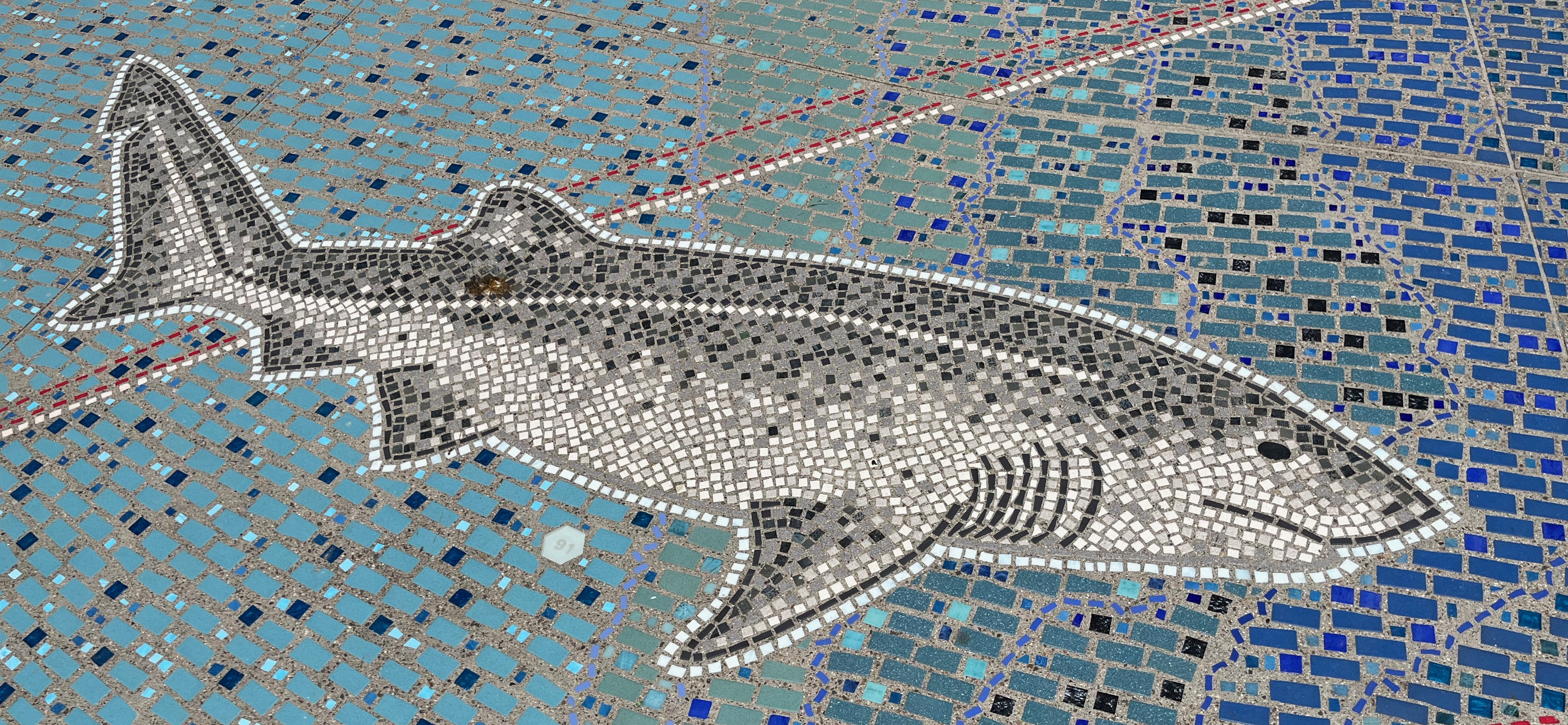
Shark, Map of the Grand Canyons of La Jolla, Kellogg Park

A Map of the Grand Canyons of La Jolla, located at Kellogg Park in La Jolla Shores, was opened to the public in October 2020. The 2,200-square-foot mosaic map, embedded in the ground, shows more than 100 life-size images of creatures found just offshore. Significant underwater canyons are indicated by varying shades of blue to mark ocean depths. The mosaic, made using a process called LithoMosaic, was sponsored by the Walter Munk Foundation for the Oceans, among other community groups.

In 2023, a 4-000 lb. bronze topographic map of the La Jolla Canyon was installed at Kellogg Park in La Jolla, titled “From the Heights of Mount Soledad to the Depths of the Grand Canyons of La Jolla.”

== Scientific monitoring ==
As specified by the Marine Life Protection Act, select marine protected areas along California's central coast are being monitored by scientists to track their effectiveness and learn more about ocean health. Similar studies in marine protected areas located off of the Santa Barbara Channel Islands have already detected gradual improvements in fish size and number.

Students and employees of University of California, San Diego, have also been permitted to use this area to conduct research and are allowed to take many marine species under the authorization of a scientific collection permit.

== See also ==
- San Diego-La Jolla Underwater Park
