= La Jolla Shores =

Beach in La Jolla, San Diego, California

Coordinates: 32°51′39″N 117°15′25″W

- Neighborhood
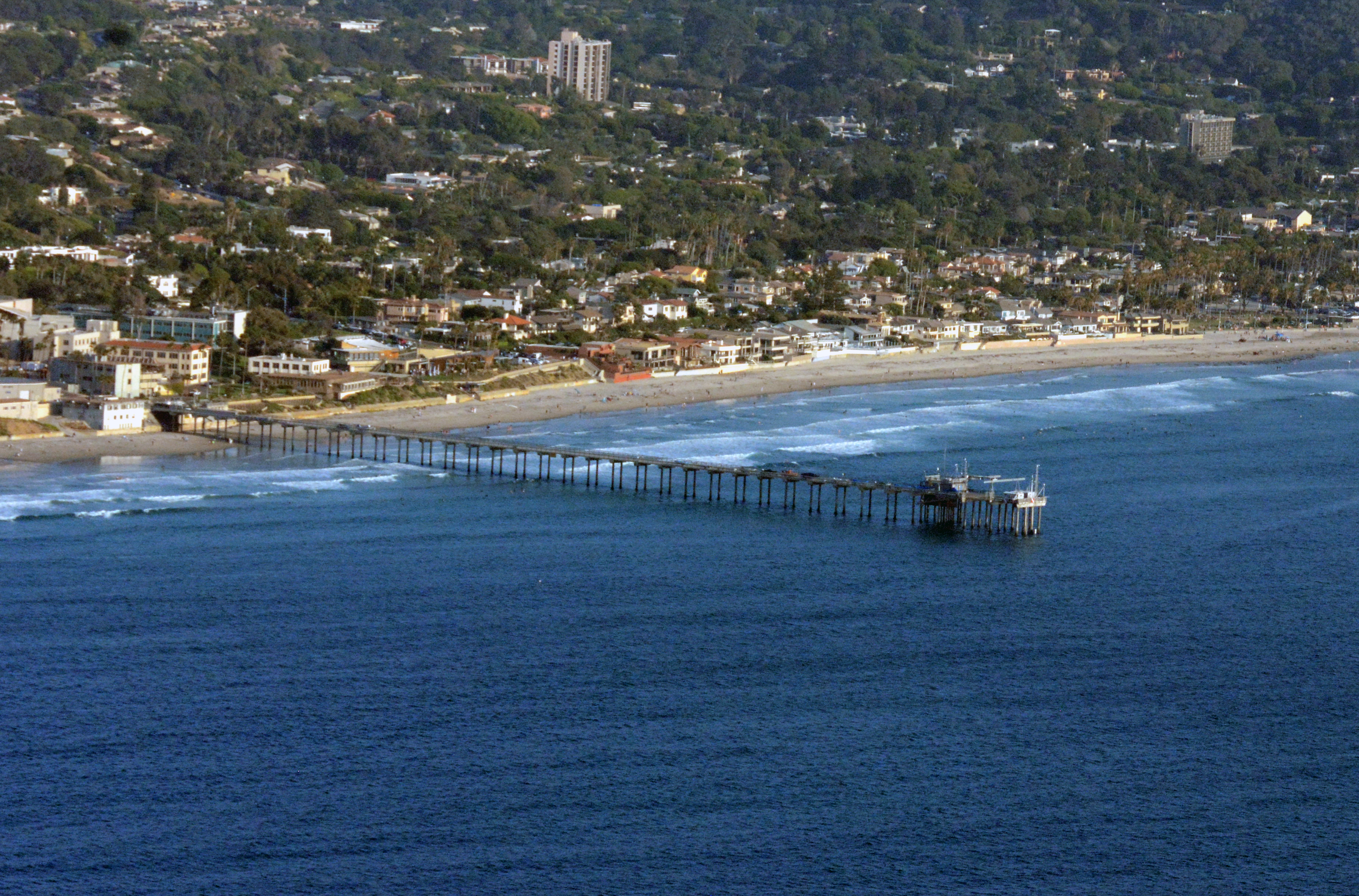
- La Jolla Shores and Scripps Pier

- Location in San Diego La Jolla Shores (California) La Jolla Shores (the United States)
- Country: United States
- State: California
- County: San Diego County
- City: San Diego
- Time zone: UTC-8 (Pacific Standard Time)
  - Summer (DST): UTC-7 (Pacific Daylight Time)
- ZIP Code: 92037
- Area code: 858
- Notable Features: Scripps Pier, Kellogg Park, San Diego-Scripps Coastal Marine Conservation Area
- Activities: Kayaking, snorkeling, stand-up paddle boarding, swimming

La Jolla Shores, with its northern part Scripps Beach, is a beach and vacation/residential community of the same name in the community of La Jolla in San Diego, California, United States. The La Jolla Shores business district is a mixed-use village encircling Laureate Park on Avenida de la Playa in the village of La Jolla Shores.

The beach is approximately one mile (1.6 km) long and stretches from the sea cliffs just north of La Jolla Cove to Black's Beach south of Torrey Pines State Natural Reserve. La Jolla Shores meets Scripps Institution of Oceanography and Kellogg Park and encompasses Scripps Pier. It borders San Diego-Scripps Coastal Marine Conservation Area and the Matlahuayl State Marine Reserve (SMR), formerly known as the San Diego-La Jolla Underwater Park.

The beach is a popular launch point for kayakers as it is the only beach boat launch in the San Diego city limits. The beach is also popular among stand up paddlers, swimmers, and snorkelers.

The southern end of the beach is especially rich with wildlife. During certain times of the year, leopard sharks, diamond stingrays, round stingrays, and species of guitarfish are common. Green sea turtles and broadnose sevengill sharks are elusive but can be found farther offshore.

Described by the Orange County Register as "the best beach in the area", La Jolla Shores regularly features in the TruTV show, Beach Patrol: San Diego and Lifeguard on The Weather Channel.

== Public art ==
A Map of the Grand Canyons of La Jolla, located at Kellogg Park, was opened to the public in October 2020. The 2,200-square-foot mosaic map, embedded in the ground, shows more than 100 life-size images of creatures found just offshore. Significant underwater canyons are indicated by varying shades of blue to mark ocean depths. The mosaic, made using a process called LithoMosaic, was sponsored by the Walter Munk Foundation for the Oceans, among other community groups.

In 2023, a 4-000 lb. bronze topographic map of the La Jolla Canyon was installed at Kellogg Park in La Jolla, titled From the Heights of Mount Soledad to the Depths of the Grand Canyons of La Jolla.

== Gallery ==
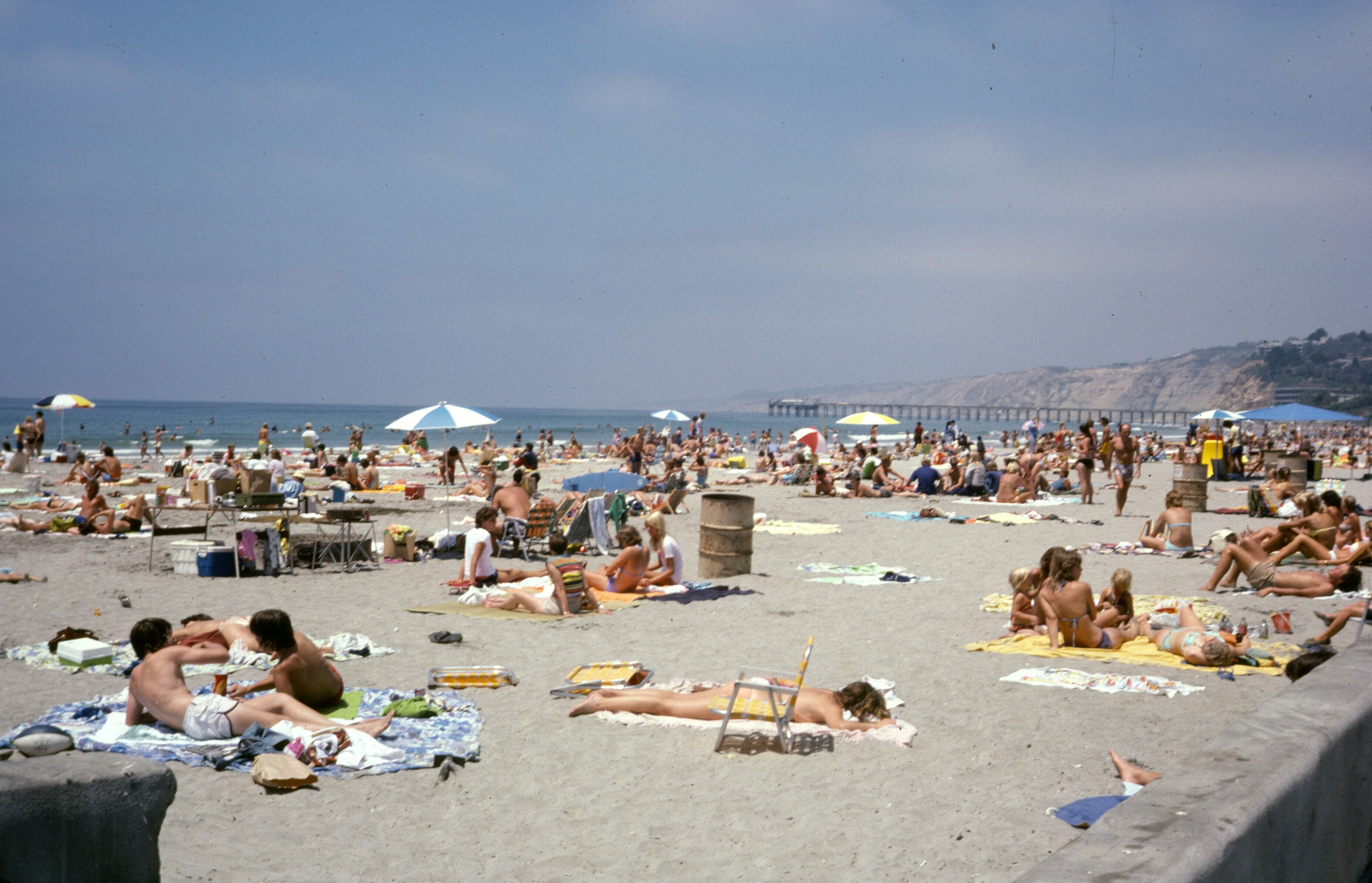
Crowded La Jolla Shores beach in July, 1978

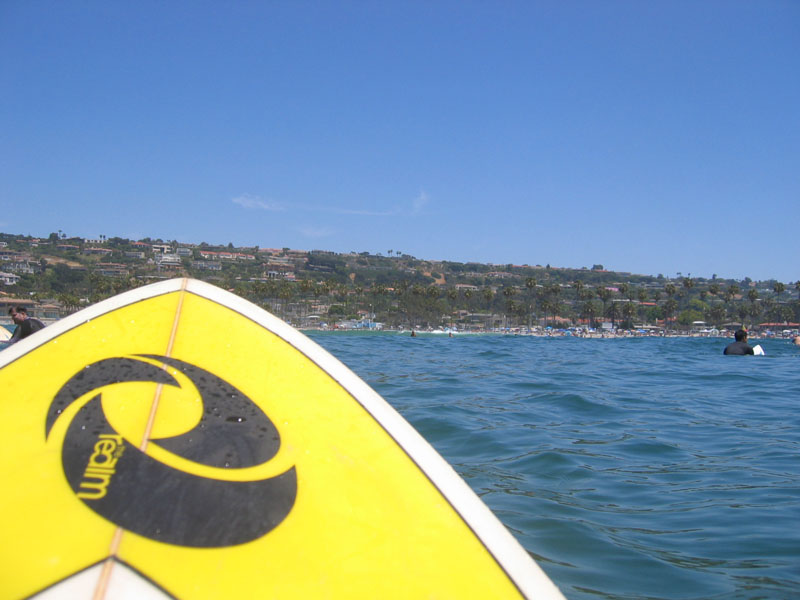
View of La Jolla Shores from the Pacific Ocean

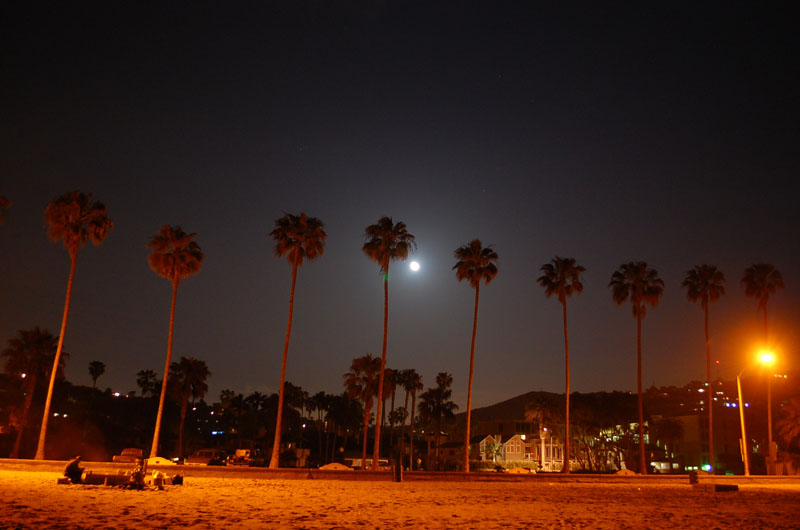
Palm trees along La Jolla Shores boardwalk

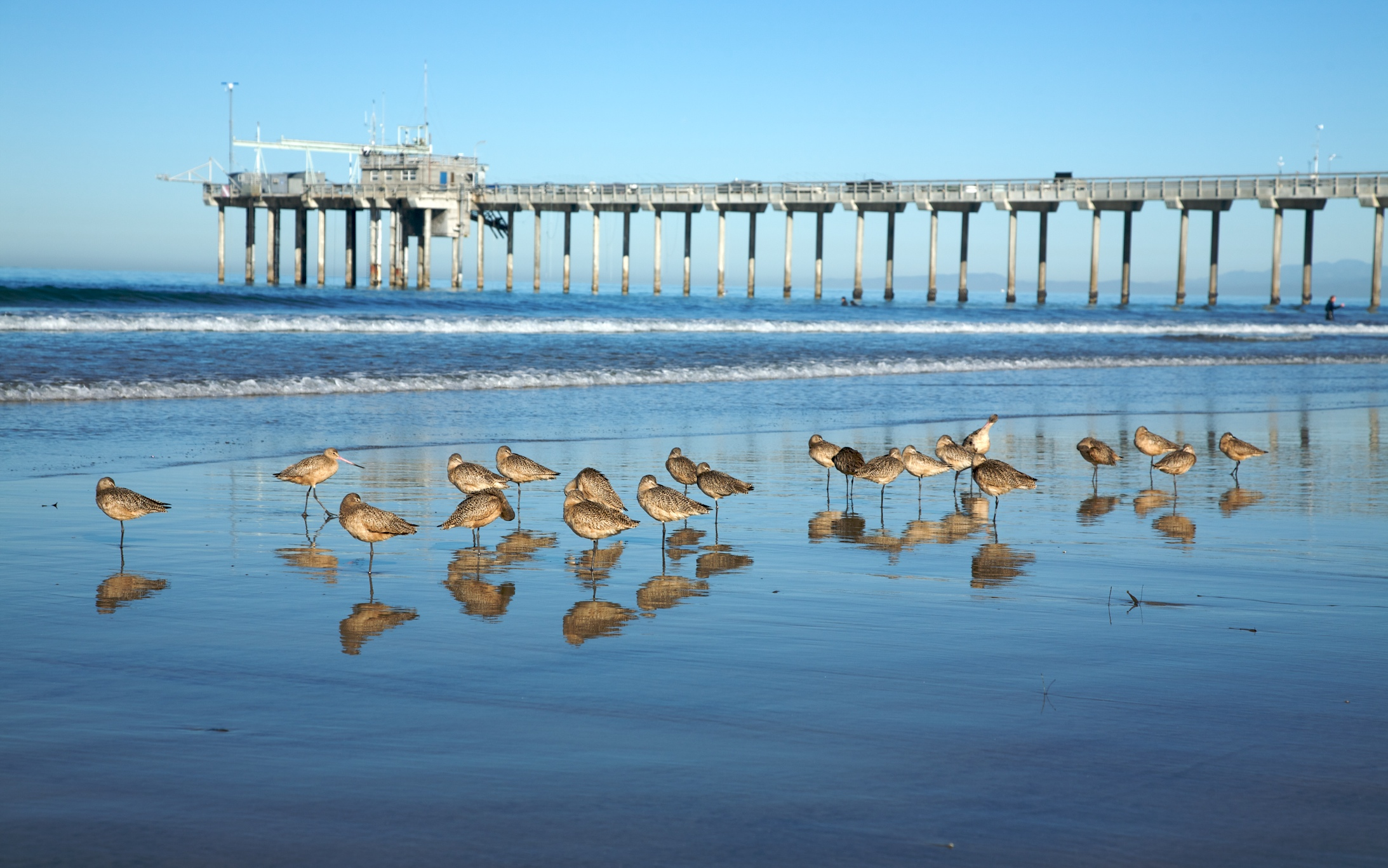
Birds in front of Scripps Pier

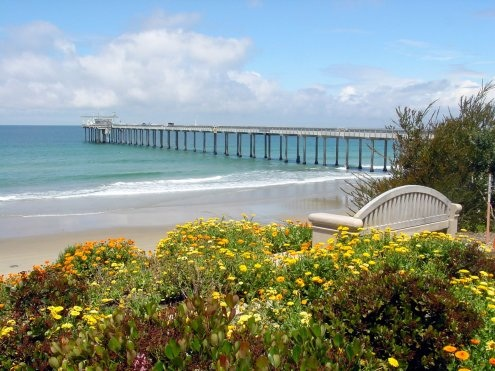
Scripps Pier in La Jolla Shores

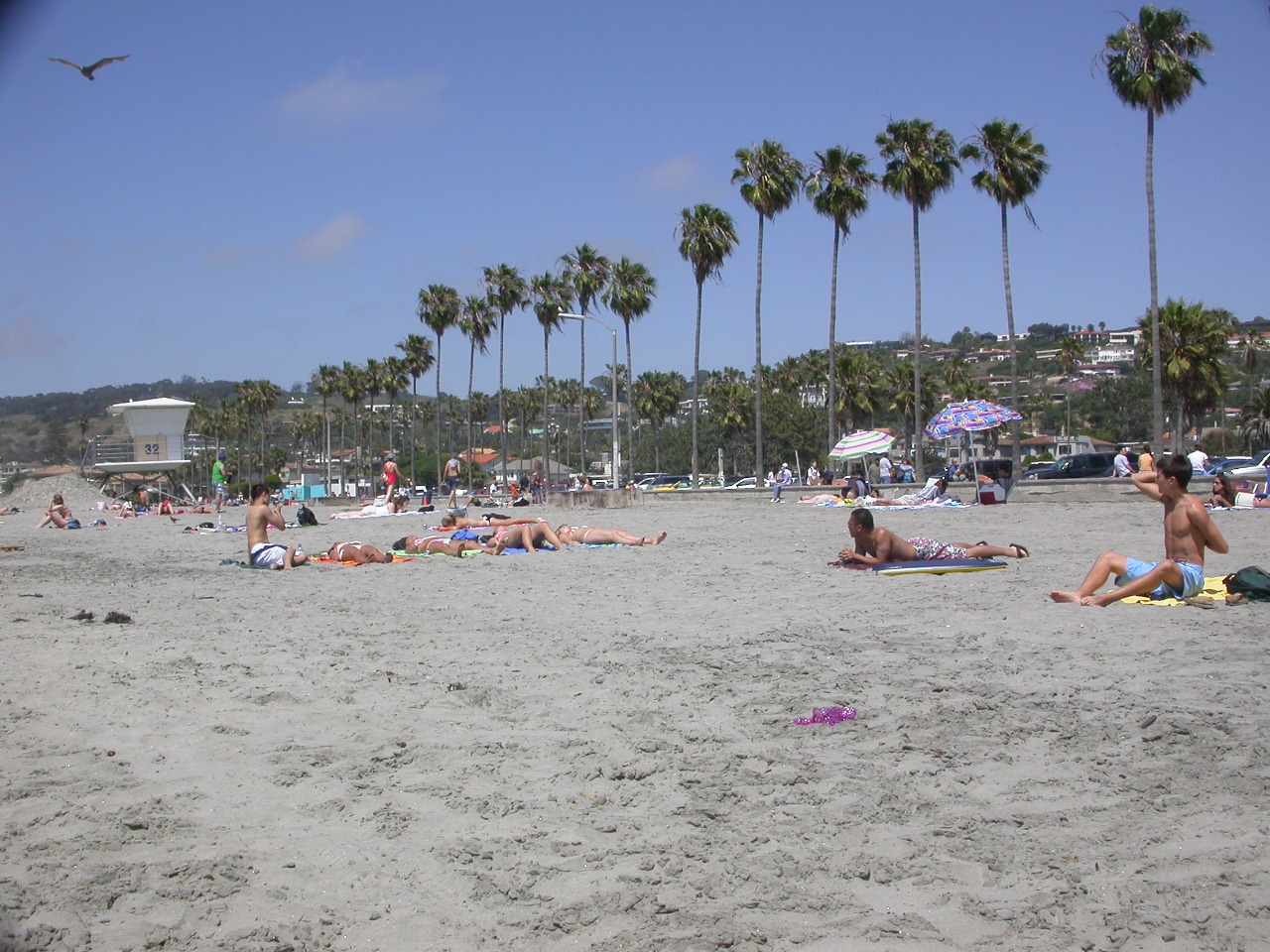
La Jolla Shores

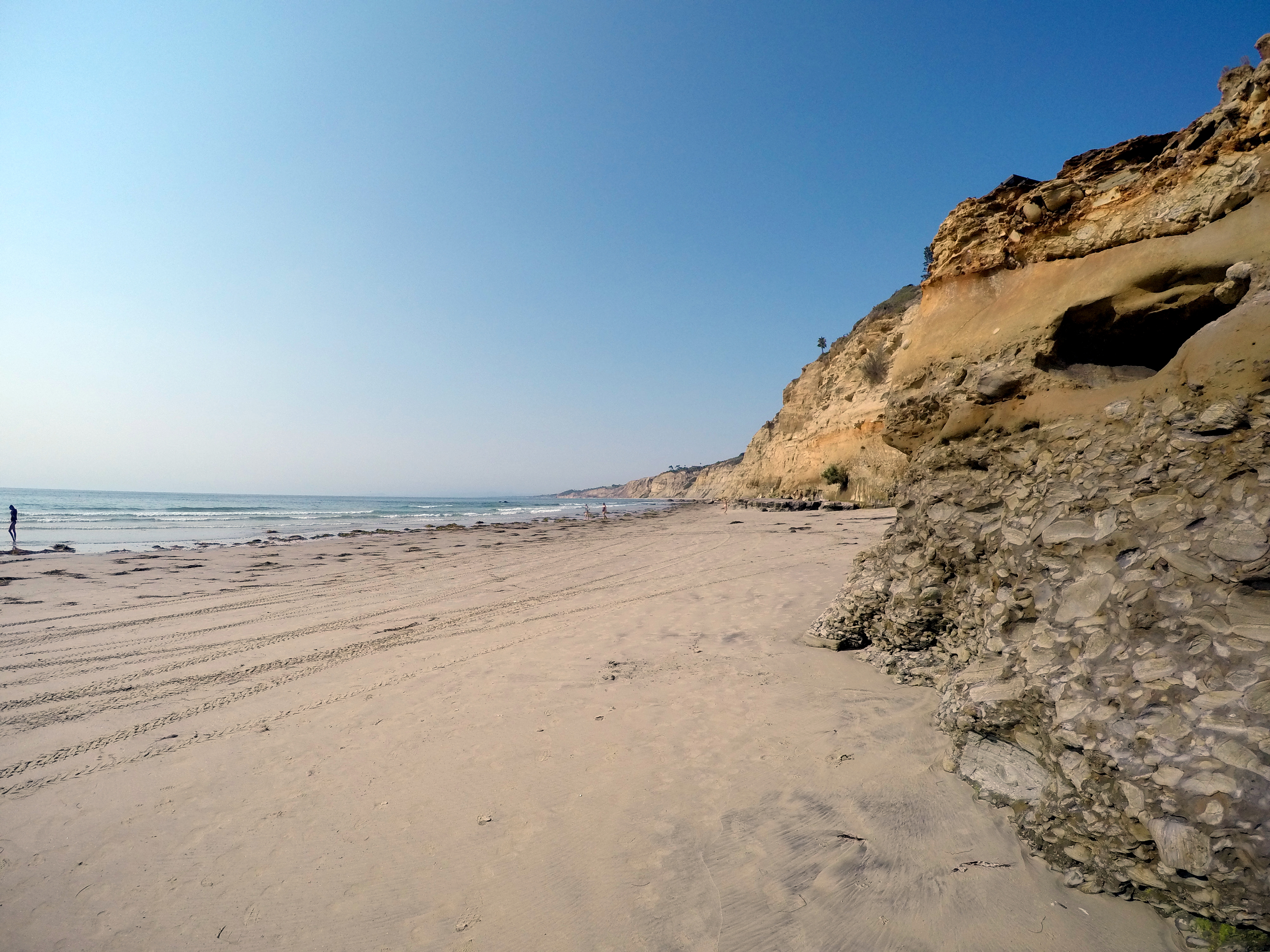
Scripps Beach

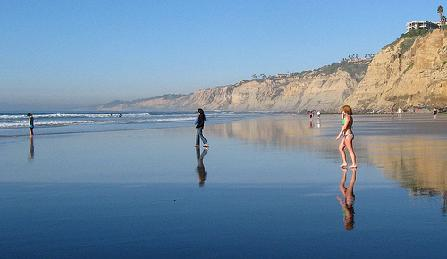

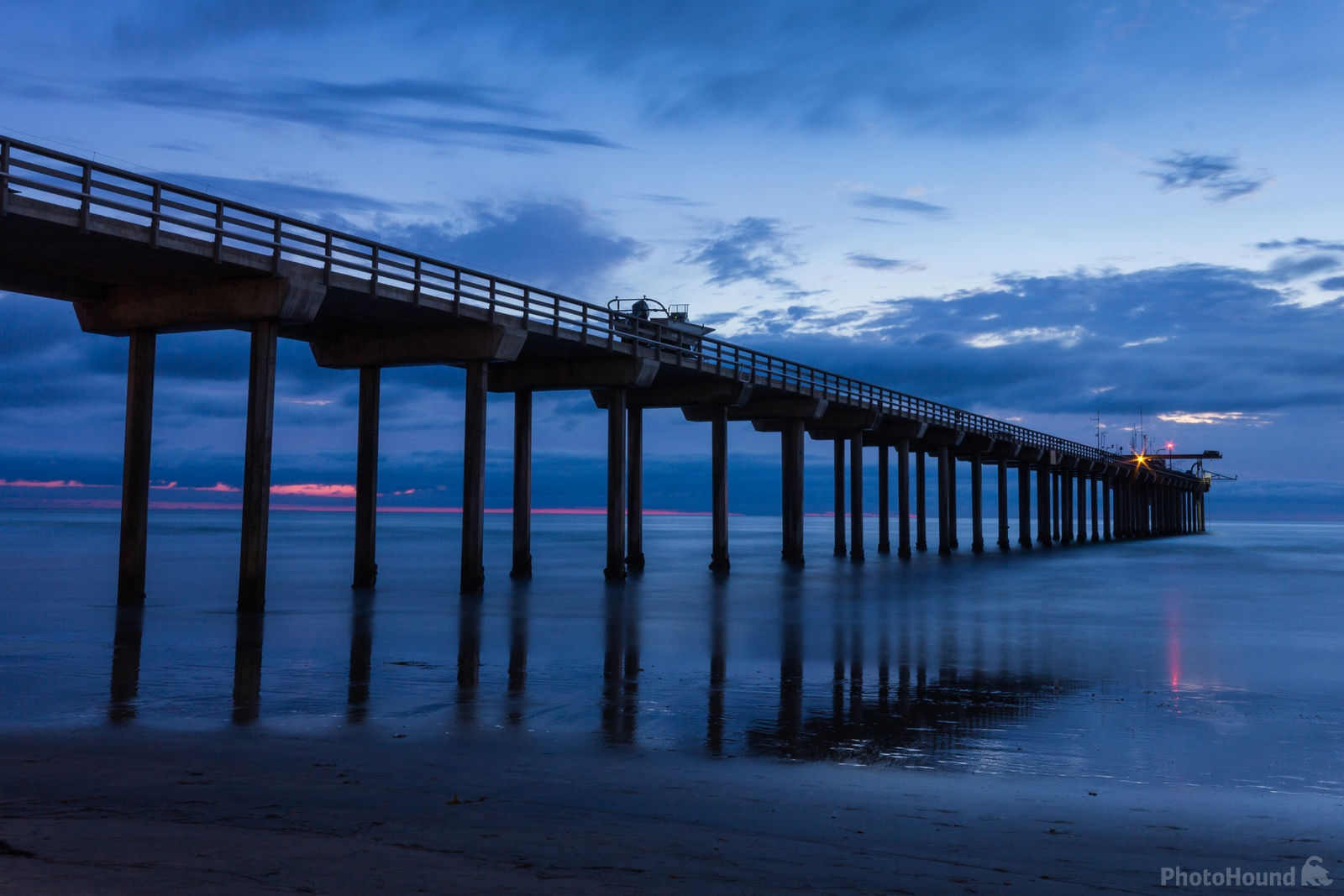
Scripps Pier, La Jolla, at sunset

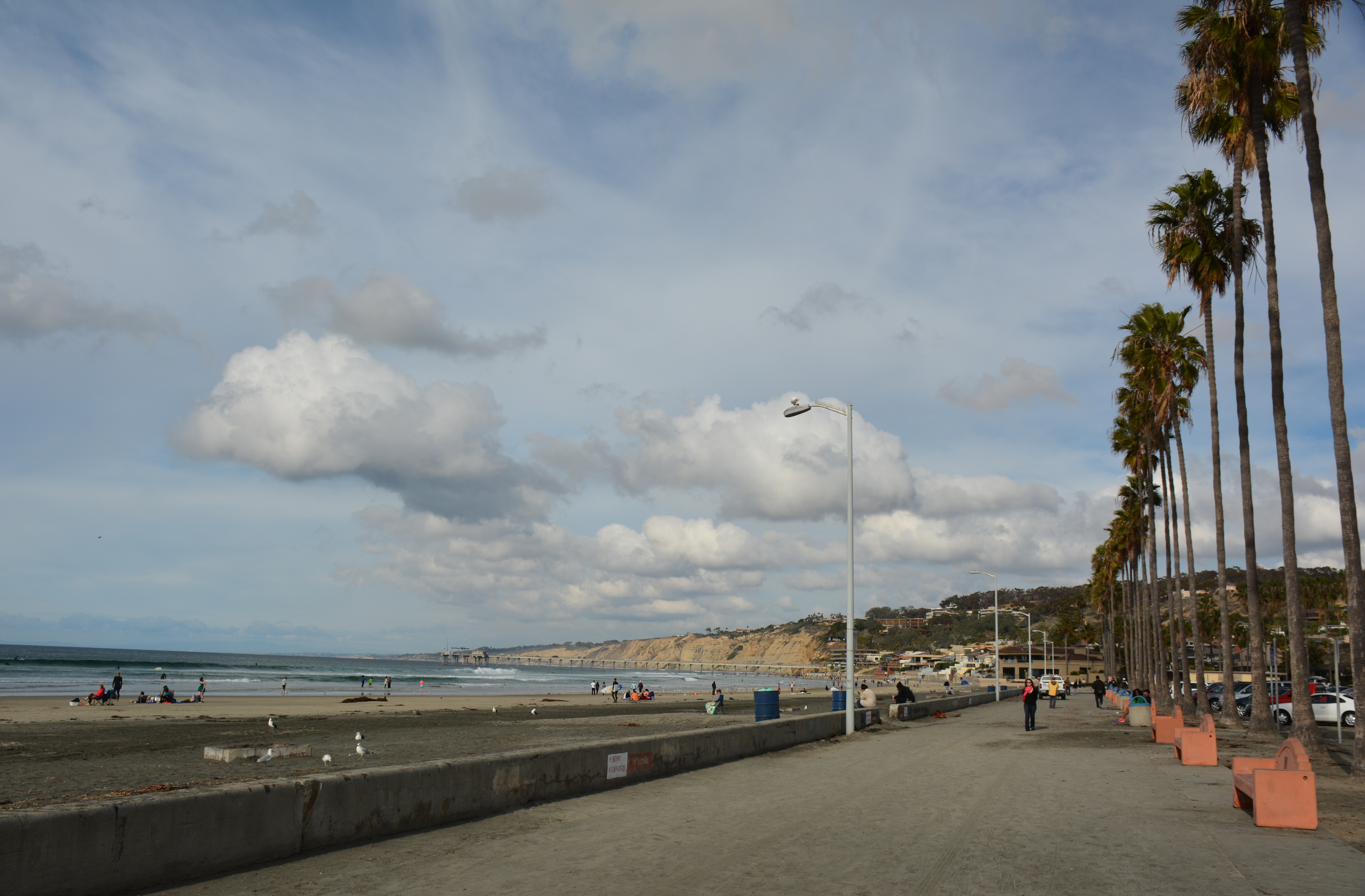
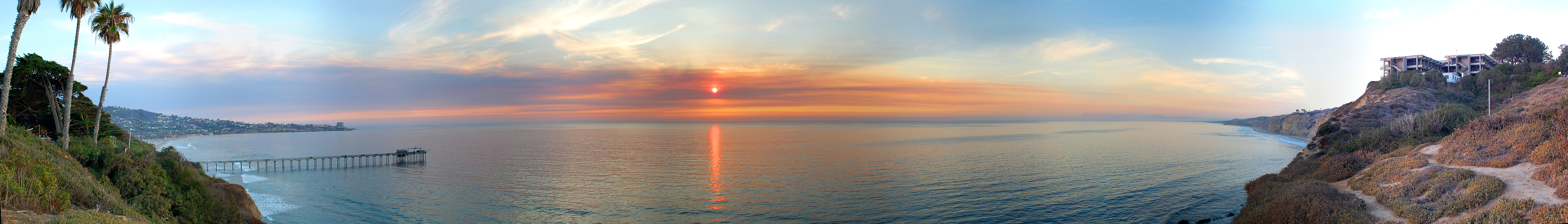
270° panorama overlooking La Jolla Shores as seen from an overlook near the Martin Johnson House, Scripps Institution of Oceanography, during a late August sunset.

== See also ==
- List of beaches in San Diego County
- List of California state parks

To the North: Black's Beach	California beaches	To the South; La Jolla Cove
