= Black's Beach =

Nude beach near San Diego, California, United States

Coordinates: 32°53′21″N 117°15′11″W

Overlooking the steep Torrey Sandstone cliffs of Torrey Pines State Natural Resever and Black's Beach below.

Black's Beach is a secluded section of beach beneath the bluffs of Torrey Pines on the Pacific Ocean in La Jolla, a community of San Diego, California. It is officially part of Torrey Pines State Beach. The northern portion of Black's Beach is owned and managed by the California Department of Parks and Recreation, while the southern portion of the beach, officially known as Torrey Pines City Beach, is jointly owned by the City of San Diego and the state park, and managed by the City of San Diego. This distinction is important as Black's Beach is most known as a nude beach.

Black's Beach was named for the Black family who had a horse ranch overlooking the beach. They sold the land, and then it was subdivided into La Jolla Farms lots. The Farms' residents retained the Black family's private road to the beach. Many mansions can be seen in the southern portion of the beach, including the Salk Mansion and the Ronald Burkle mansion. There is a funicular that goes all the way down from a mansion on the cliff to the beach into a structure known by locals as the Mushroom House.

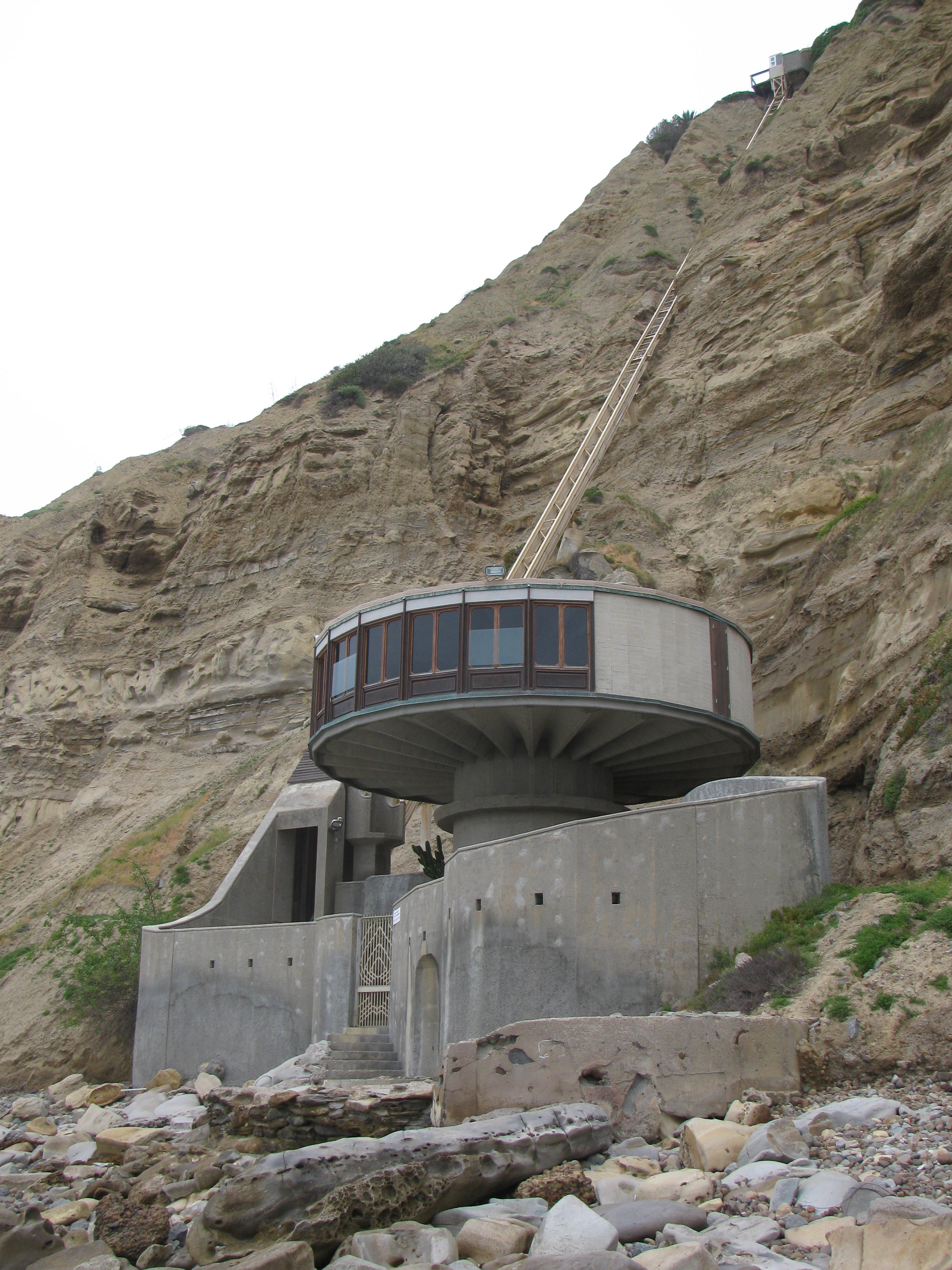
"Mushroom House" on south end of Black's Beach, north of Scripps Pier with funicular to La Jolla Farms mansion atop cliff

A submarine canyon funnels swells into Black's Beach, making it appealing to surfers but dangerous for inexperienced swimmers. Usually, lifeguards are at the beach until 6:00 p.m., year round. Due to budget cuts, lifeguard patrols were limited but have increased because of funding by UC San Diego. Stingrays can be found along the coastline when the water is above 50 degrees.

== Location ==
Black's Beach is about one mile north of the popular La Jolla Shores beach in La Jolla, below the bluffs of Torrey Pines, which extend up to 300 feet (91 m) above the sandy beach. On the bluffs above Black's Beach are Torrey Pines Gliderport, Torrey Pines Golf Course, Torrey Pines State Natural Reserve, and the Salk Institute for Biological Studies. To the north of Black's Beach lies the rest of Torrey Pines State Beach, which altogether stretches 4.5 miles (7.2 km) from Del Mar, California, past Los Peñasquitos Lagoon toward Scripps Beach. To the east of Black's Beach is the campus of the University of California, San Diego.

== Nude beach ==
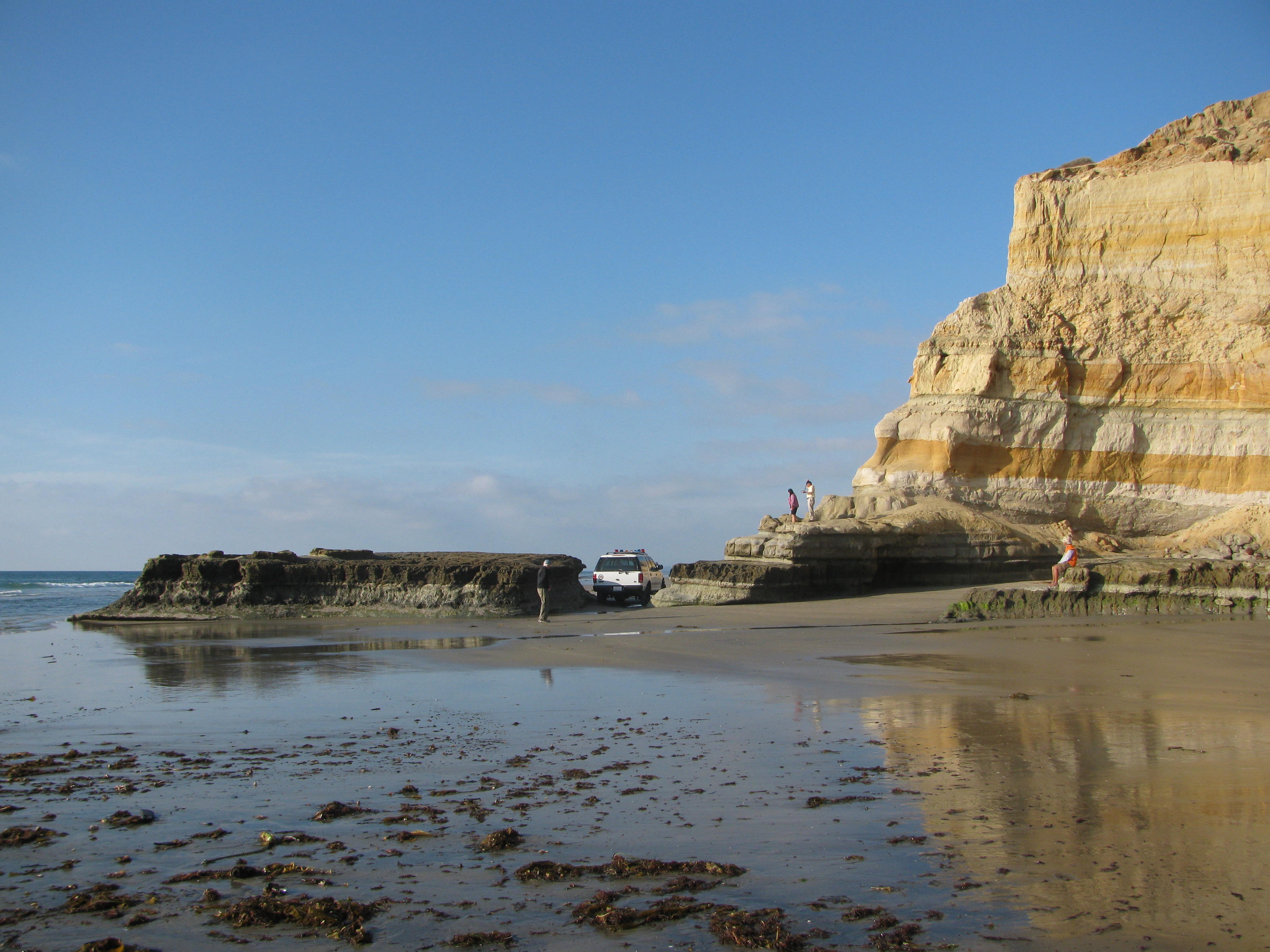
State Park police car or Lifeguard navigating Flatrock Point at low tide, Torrey Pines State Beach, La Jolla, CA

Black's Beach is one of the largest nude beaches in the United States, and is popular with Southern Californian nudists and naturists. Originally including the current Torrey Pines State Beach, Black's Beach was the first and only public nude beach in the country for several years in the mid-1970s. Since Black's Beach was traditionally recognized as a clothing-optional beach, nudity is tolerated for the portion of the beach that is managed by the state park. Until 1977, the city portion of Black's Beach was posted as "swimsuit optional"; in that year, nudity was prohibited on that part of the beach.

The clothing-optional portion of Black's Beach begins about 100 yards (91 m) south of the trail head leading to Torrey Pines Gliderport, and runs north for approximately 1.1 miles (1.8 km) to the beached steel buoy south of Flatrock Point.

The northern portion of the beach is frequented by the local LGBTQ+ community.

== Surfing ==
The southern portion of Black's Beach is known to surfers as one of the most powerful surf breaks in Southern California. The waves gain their power due to the focusing effects of Scripps Canyon, an underwater canyon just offshore in the San Diego-La Jolla Underwater Park. Due to the sometimes large surf, fast breaking waves, and aggressive crowds, Black's is a dangerous surfing location, advisable for advanced surfers only.

== Access ==
Black's Beach can be difficult to access due to its location beneath the Torrey Pines bluffs. Landslides can occur, with tragic results. Beachgoers are warned to avoid setting up beach sites too close to the cliffs. There are four access routes to Black's Beach.

Torrey Pines Gliderport Trail – the most popular route to Black's Beach is via the trail from the Gliderport, located between Torrey Pines Gliderport and the Salk Institute for Biological Studies. This steep rugged trail down the 300-foot (91 m) cliffs is usually well maintained by local nudists of the beach, but the City of San Diego posted a “Do Not Use” sign there, as the Torrey Pines cliffs are unstable. Visitors are advised to stay on the designated trails since many people have gotten stuck or even fallen to their deaths on the cliffs.

Salk Canyon Road from UCSD – Students from the University of California, San Diego have access to this steep, 0.5-mile (0.80 km) long, gated, paved road at the southern end of Black's Beach, which is popular with surfers. The clothing-optional portion of the beach begins 0.5 miles (0.80 km) north of this access point.

Torrey Pines State Beach – A 2-mile (3.2 km) walk south from the parking lot at the base of Torrey Pines State Natural Reserve, along the steep cliffs, and past Flatrock arrives at Black's Beach. As of summer 2024, the hiking path around Flatrock Point has collapsed, and anyone wishing to get to Black's from Torrey Pines must climb the rocks or wade through waist-deep water.

La Jolla Shores – If the tide is low, a 3-mile (4.8 km) walk north from La Jolla Shores beach, past Scripps Pier and the rocky tidepools of Scripps Beach takvisitors to Black's Beach. The route is blocked at high tides. During low tide, it is also possible to walk from Torrey Pines State beach to Black's Beach.

Black's Beach

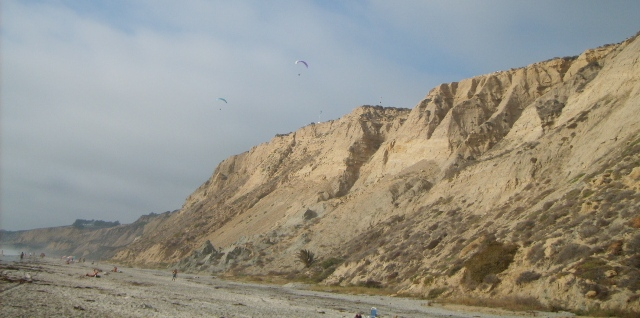
Black's Beach

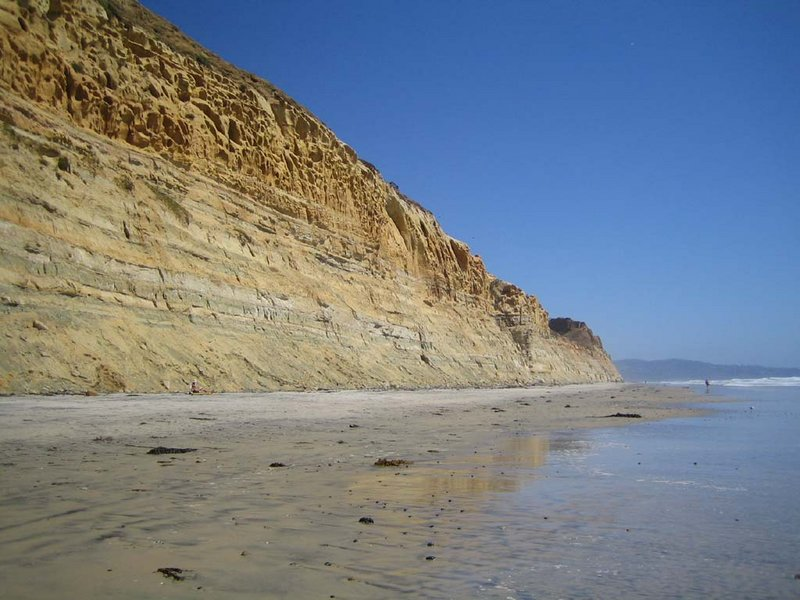
The cliffs at Black's Beach

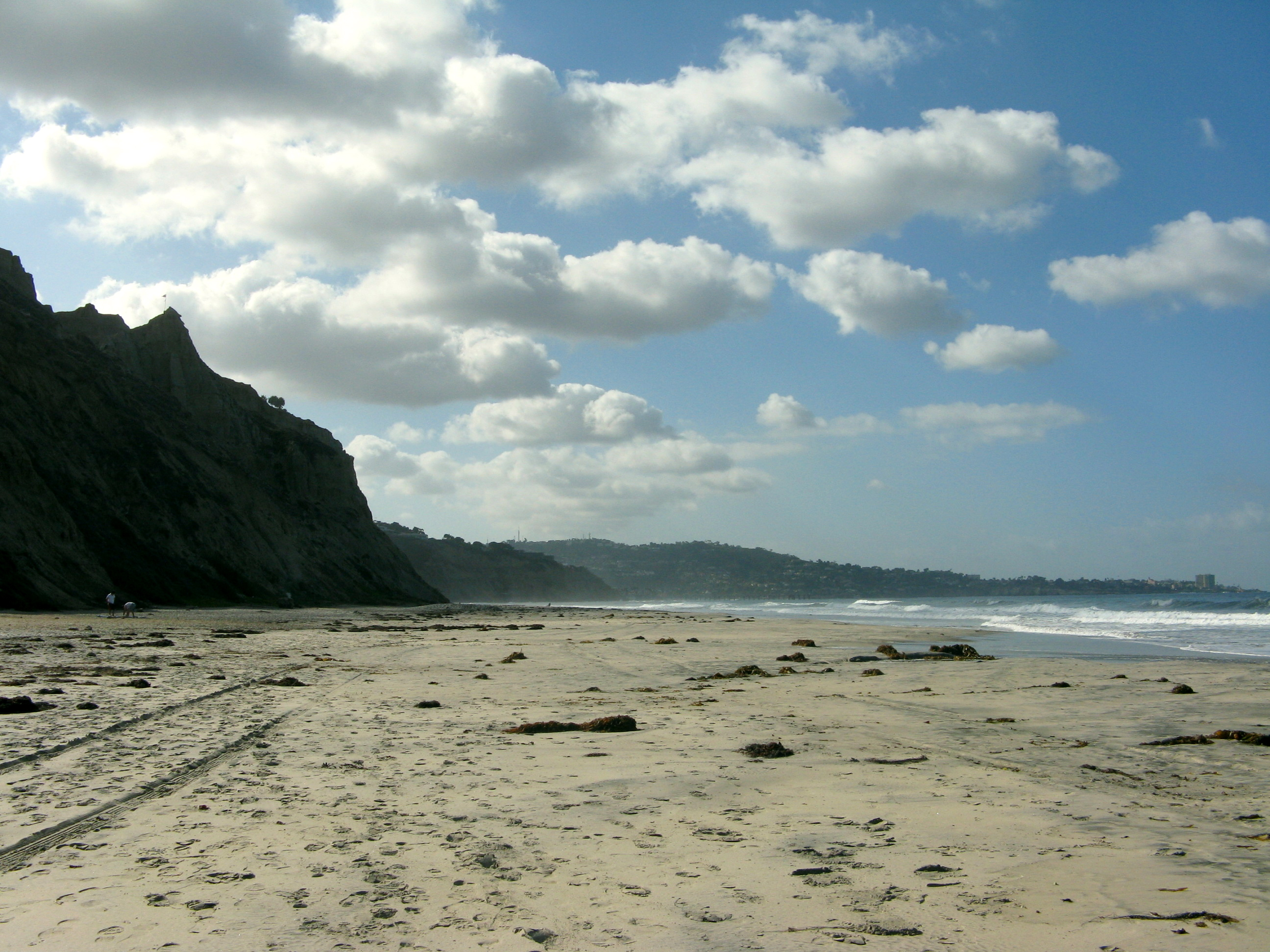
Black's Beach, view south toward La Jolla

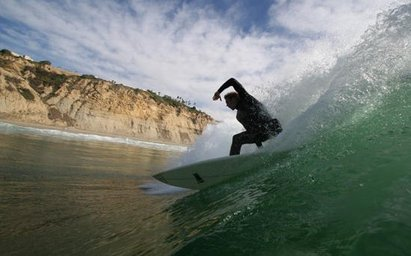
A surfer at Black's, with cliffs in background

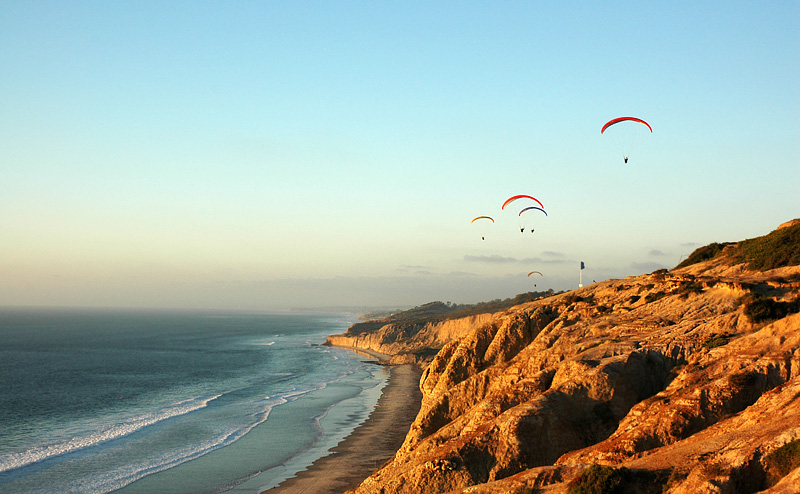
Paragliders drifting from Torrey Pines Gliderport

360° panorama view of the beach
Black's Beach access

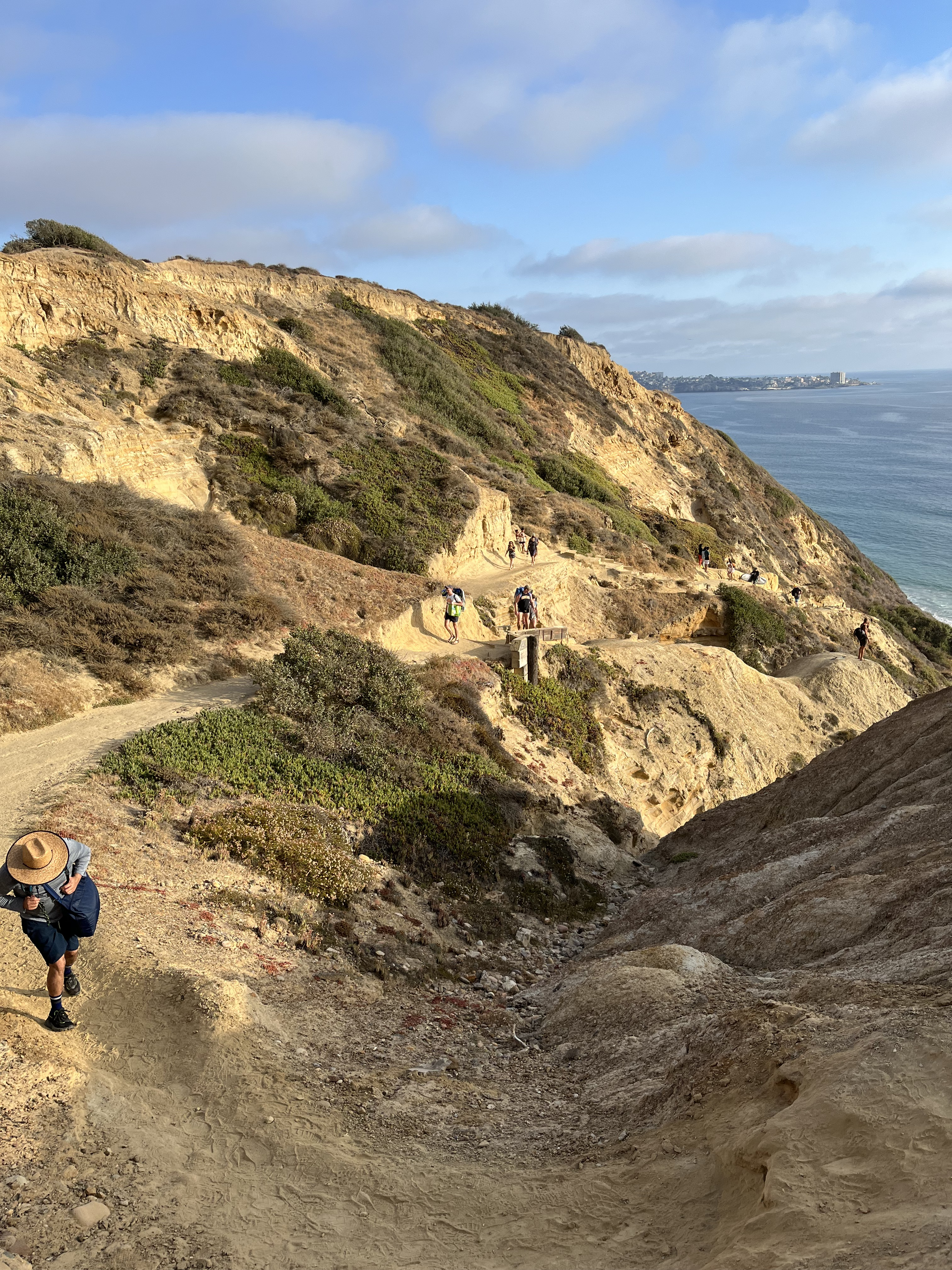
Black's Beach Trail from Gliderport

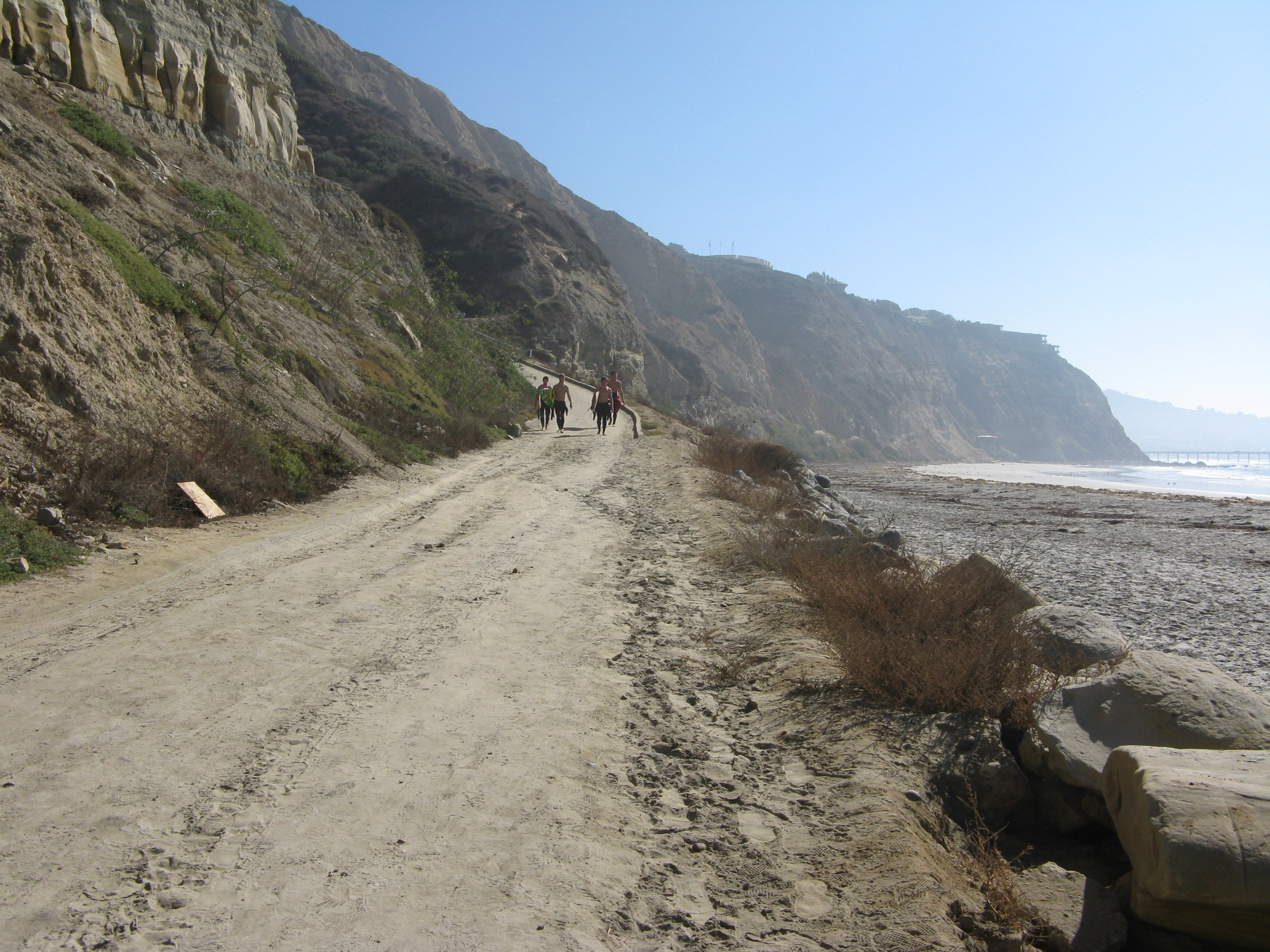
Black's Beach access from Salk Canyon Road, UCSD

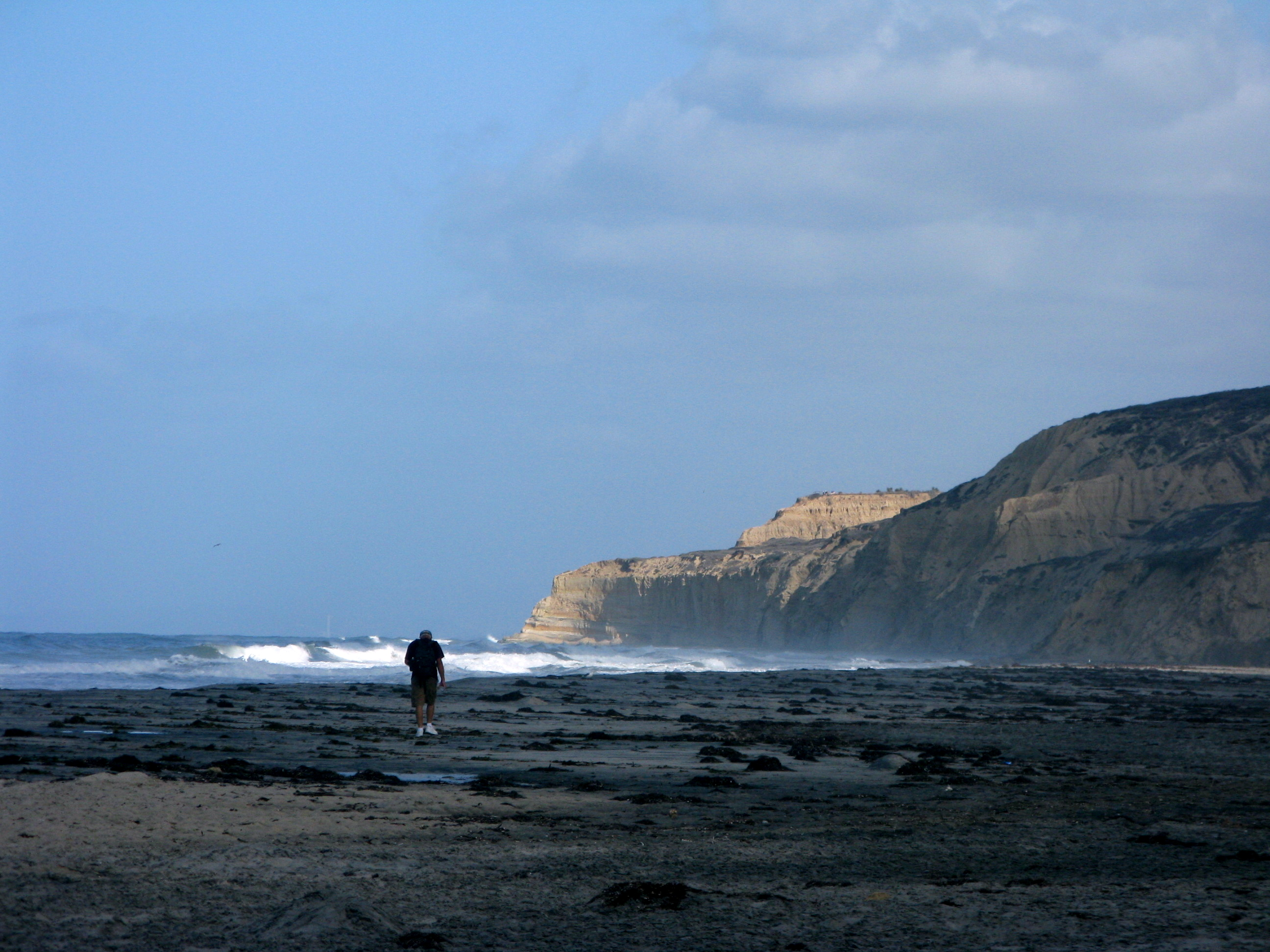
Black's Beach access from the North (Torrey Pines Beach)

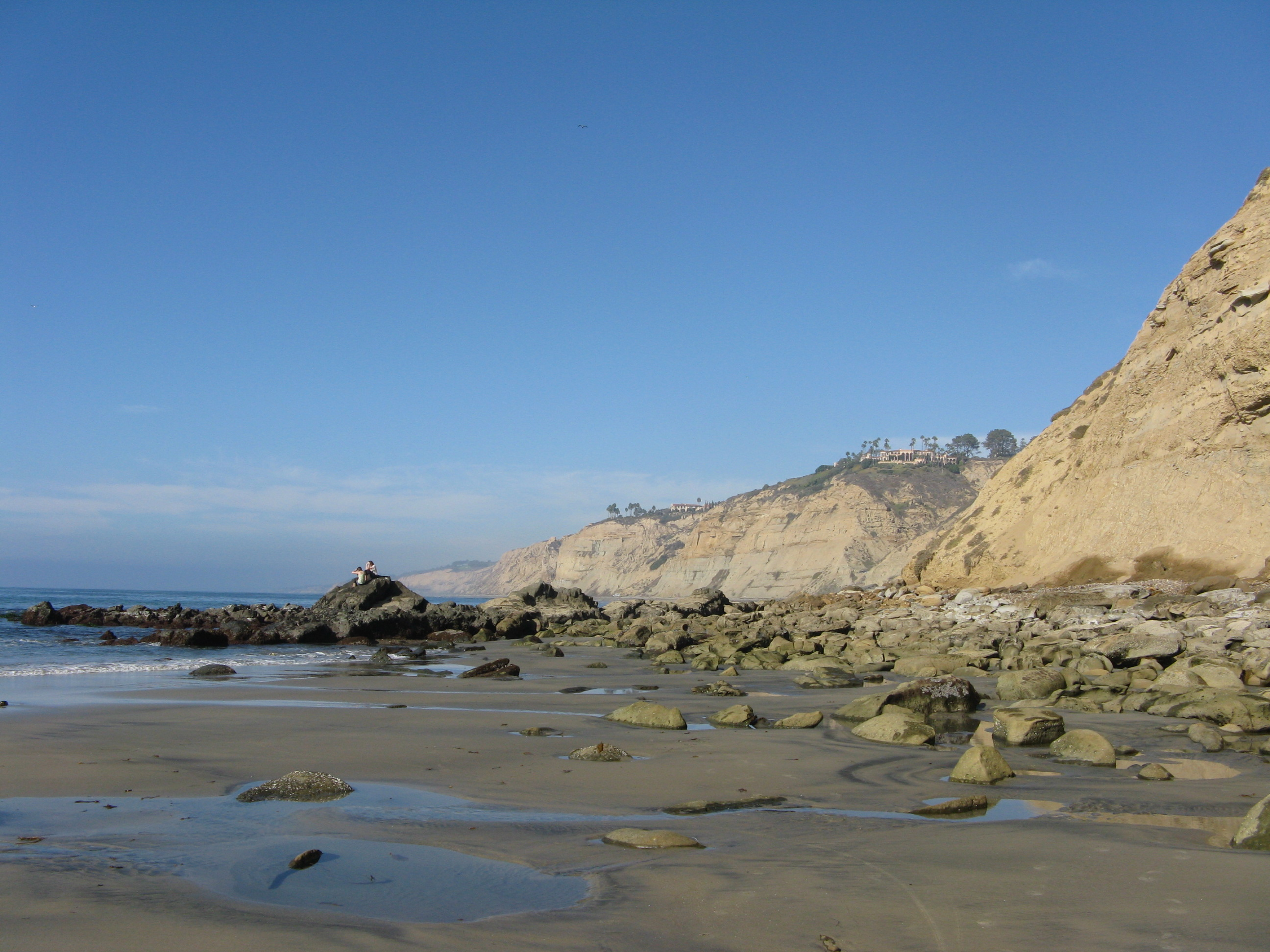
Black's Beach Access from South (Scripps Beach/La Jolla Shores)

== See also ==
- List of beaches in San Diego County
- List of beaches in the United States
- List of social nudity organizations
- List of public outdoor clothes free places
- Naturism
- Nude beach
- Public nudity

To the North: Torrey Pines State Beach	California beaches	To the South; La Jolla Shores
