= Scripps Canyon =

Submarine canyon off San Diego, California, USA

- Submarine canyon
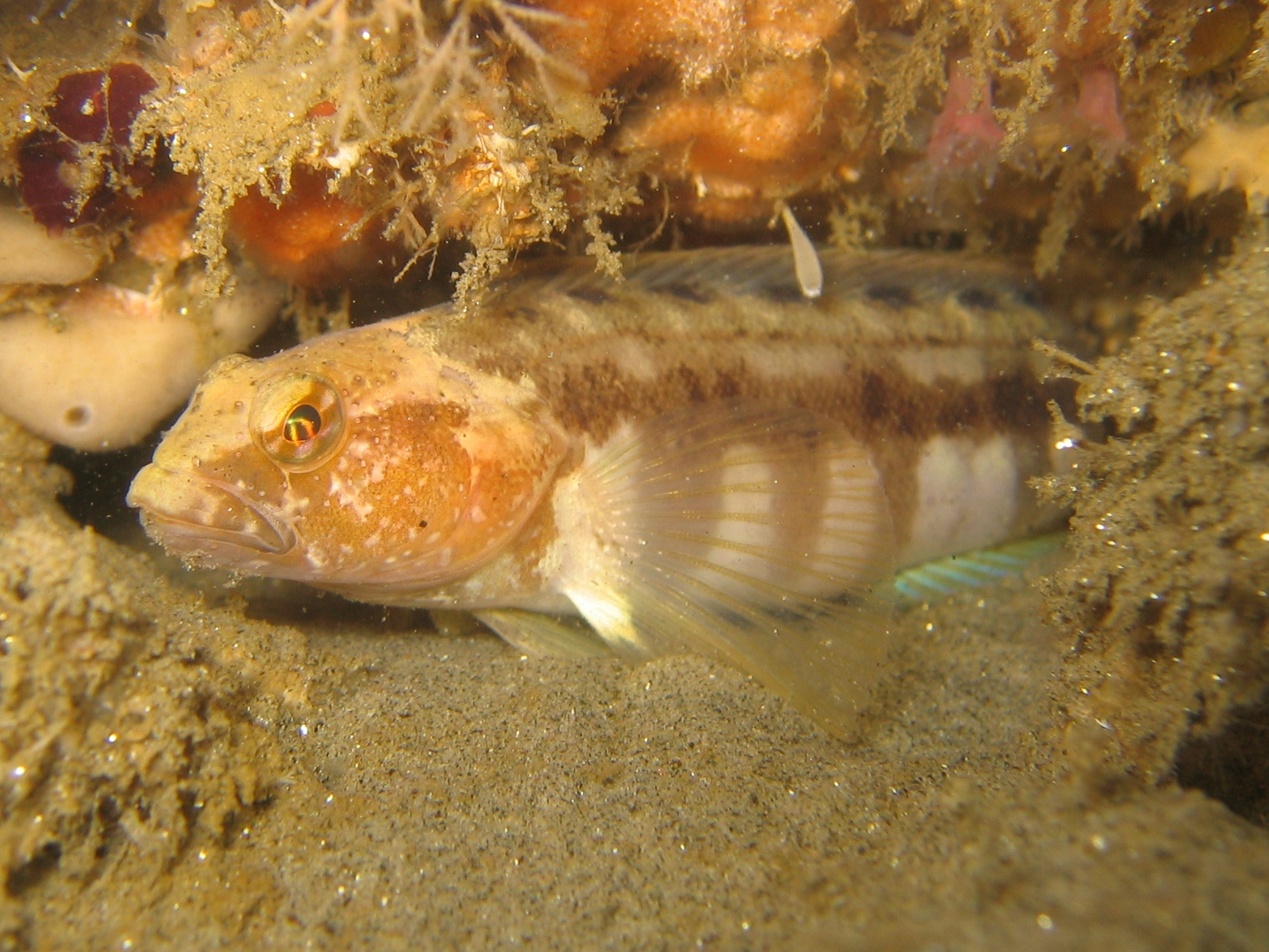
- A stripedfin ronquil (Rathbunella hypoplecta) photographed in Scripps Canyon

- Coordinates: 32°52′N 117°16′W

Dimensions
  - Length: 1 mile (1.6 km)
  - Depth: 1,600 feet (490 m)

Scripps Canyon is a narrow submarine canyon in the Pacific Ocean, off the coast of Southern California, United States. The canyon is approximately 1 mile (1.6 km) long and joins La Jolla Canyon offshore.

Scripps Canyon is a popular site for scientific and recreational diving due to its vertical walls and high density of marine life.

== Geography and characteristics ==
Scripps Canyon, located near Scripps Institution of Oceanography (SIO), a major oceanographic research institution, and as a result is one of the best-studied underwater canyons. The canyon lies within the bounds of the San Diego-Scripps Coastal Marine Conservation Area (formerly the San Diego-La Jolla Underwater Park).

Two branches extend from Scripps Canyon pointing east towards the coastline, known in literature as the Sumner and South branches.

== History ==
The first measurements at Scripps Canyon were in 1937 by lead-line soundings collected by Francis Shepard in a rowboat by Scripps Pier. Scripps Canyon was first extensively explored by Frank Haymaker in October of 1946 using a helmet-and-airhose setup to collect samples for Shepard. When the aqualung arrived at SIO in the 1950s, surface-supplied dives were replaced by SCUBA.

Focusing on the sand plain between the heads of the La Jolla and Scripps canyons, SIO's Dr. Edward Fager continued to collect samples at depths of 5–10 fathoms (9.1–18.3 m) from 1956 to 1973.

Scripps Canyon was the site of the SEALAB II project in 1965, where divers dwelled in a submersible habitat at 205 ft (62 m) for 15 days at a time.

The canyon was a site of physical oceanography research in the 1970s and 1980s to look at water-sediment interactions such as turbidity currents, canyon erosion, and sediment resuspension.

== Biology ==
Early exploration of the canyon by Haymaker in the late 1940s revealed a number of organisms through underwater photography. Gorgonia corals, bivalve pholad borings, kelp, eel grass, blacksmith, sea cucumbers, sand dollars, and California rockfish were photographed within the canyon.

A 2016 study of the canyon found differences in the distribution of demersal fishes. The canyon is dominated throughout by rockfish, particularly the species of halfbanded (Sebastes semicinctus) and Sebastomus. Other common fish include poacher, sole, and lizardfish.

In April 2024, droves of tuna crabs were spotted in Scripps Canyon. Due to the cold waters of the canyon, mass dying of the crabs led to many washing up on beaches.

Scripps Canyon is considered a native habitat of swellsharks.
