= Torrey Pines Gliderport =

Airport in San Diego, California, US

- IATA: none; ICAO: none; FAA LID: CA84

Summary
- Airport type: Private
- Owner: City of San Diego
- Elevation AMSL: 372 ft (113 m)
- Interactive map of Torrey Pines Gliderport

Runways
Direction	Length		Surface
Direction	ft	m	Surface
9/27	1,500	457	Asphalt
- Source: Federal Aviation Administration

- Torrey Pines Gliderport
- U.S. National Register of Historic Places
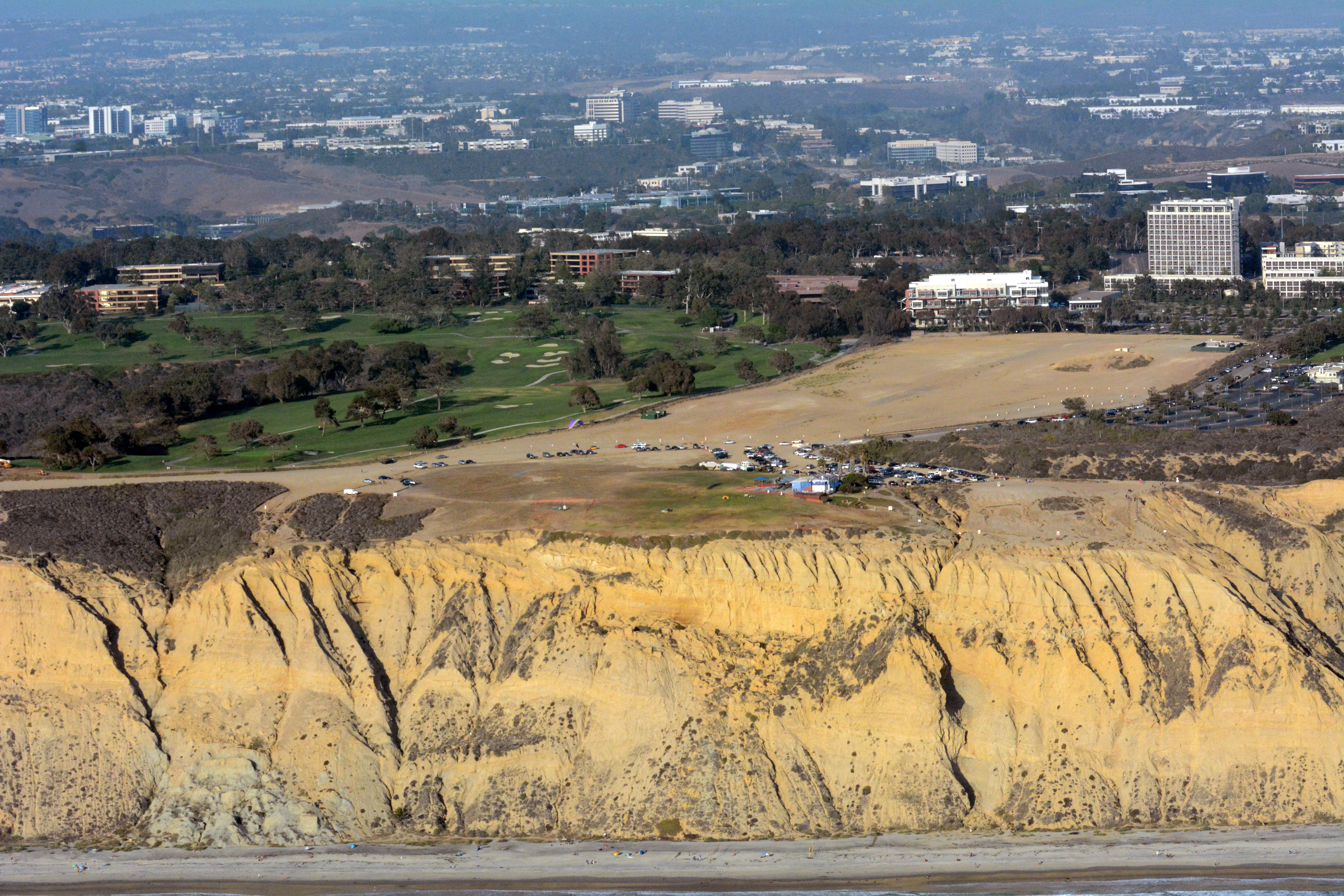
- Gliderport, August 2014

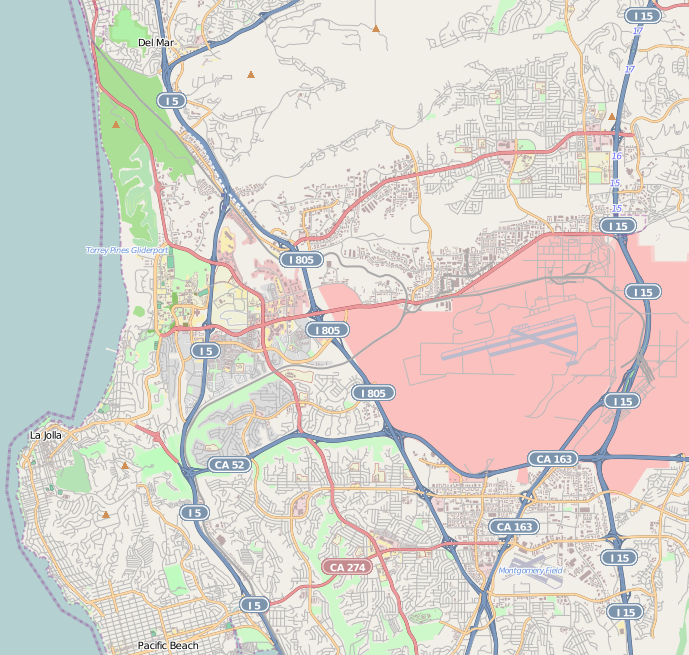
- Location within Northwestern San Diego Location within San Diego County, California Location within California Location within the United States
- Location: Torrey Pines, San Diego, California
- Coordinates: 32°53′23″N 117°14′54″W
- Built: 1930
- NRHP reference No.: 93000578
- Added to NRHP: July 12, 1993

Torrey Pines Gliderport (FAA LID: CA84) is a city-owned private-use glider airport in the La Jolla community of San Diego, California, United States, 11 nautical miles (20 km) northwest of downtown San Diego.

It was first established as a soaring site in 1930, and is the home to hang gliding, paragliding, radio-controlled model sailplanes, and full-scale man-carrying sailplanes. It is listed as a National Landmark of Soaring of the National Soaring Museum, a San Diego City Historical Site (#315), and a Model Aviation Landmark of the Academy of Model Aeronautics. It is listed on the California Register of Historic Places and the National Register of Historic Places. It is considered by glider enthusiasts of all types to be the "Kitty Hawk of the West".

Full-scale sailplanes are operated by the Associated Glider Clubs of Southern California, only during special permit windows between February and April, while models, hang gliders, and paragliders fly any time the wind permits. The local Flight Director and Concessionaire maintains and enforces safety rules to protect both pilots and spectators.

== History ==
The Torrey Pines cliffs have featured soaring aircraft since the 1930s, with many famous aviators earning their wings on the strong ocean breezes.

Many aviation pioneers have flown at Torrey Pines. On February 24, 1930, Charles A. Lindbergh made the first soaring flight in a sailplane above the cliffs at Torrey Pines on a flight Mt. Soledad to Del Mar in a Bowlus sailplane. His flight also established a western regional distance record for gliders at the time. His wife Anne Morrow Lindbergh had qualified as the first American woman to earn a first-class glider license on a flight in a Bowlus sailplane also from Mt. Soledad on January 29, 1930. Between 1930 and 1935, area high school students building and flying gliders in the area began to auto-tow their gliders from the beach at the north end of the cliffs near Torrey Pines State Park, soaring in the lift, and landing on the beach. In 1936, Woody Brown became the first person to launch a glider from the top of the cliffs and land back on the top, thus opening Torrey Pines Gliderport. Between 1936 and 1940, the gliderport was so popular that San Diego mayor Percy J. Benbough dedicated the gliderport "to the youth of California" on January 1, 1939.

During World War II, the gliderport and its surroundings were transformed into U.S. Army Camp Callan, an anti-aircraft artillery training facility. After the end of the war, members of the Associated Glider Clubs of Southern California arranged a lease with the City of San Diego and recreational glider operations resumed. By the 1950s, radio-controlled model sailplanes were flown at the site, with hang gliding becoming popular at the site in the early 1970s, and paragliding at the site since the late 1980s.

The gliderport has been the location of several national and international soaring records and is associated with many important individuals in the development of soaring in the United States including Hawley Bowlus, Bud Perl, Bill Beuby, John Robinson, Dick Essery, Bill Ivans, Helen Dick, Richard Johnson, Bill Petre, Robert Cardenas and Paul MacCready. For many years Torrey Pines was also home to the Pacific Coast Midwinter Soaring Championships, one of the longest running annual glider events in United States history.

== Location ==
Located on the cliffs above Black's Beach, next to the Salk Institute for Biological Studies, Torrey Pines Gliderport has views of the Pacific Ocean and the city of San Diego. Nearby is the Scripps Institution of Oceanography, Torrey Pines Golf Course, Torrey Pines State Beach, Torrey Pines State Natural Reserve, and the University of California, San Diego. The trail to the clothing optional Black's Beach begins on the cliffs just south of the gliderport.

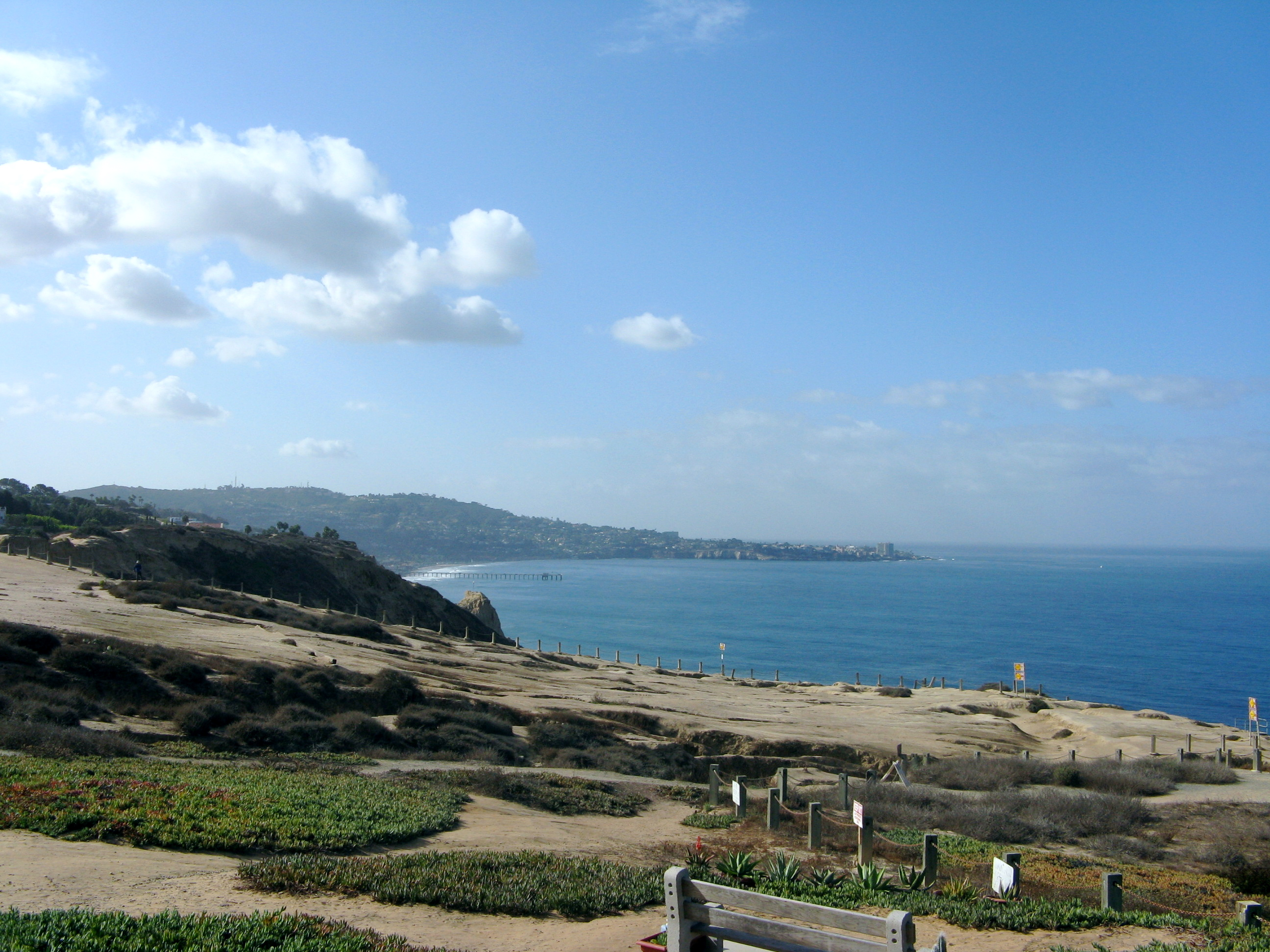
View of La Jolla from Torrey Pines Gliderport

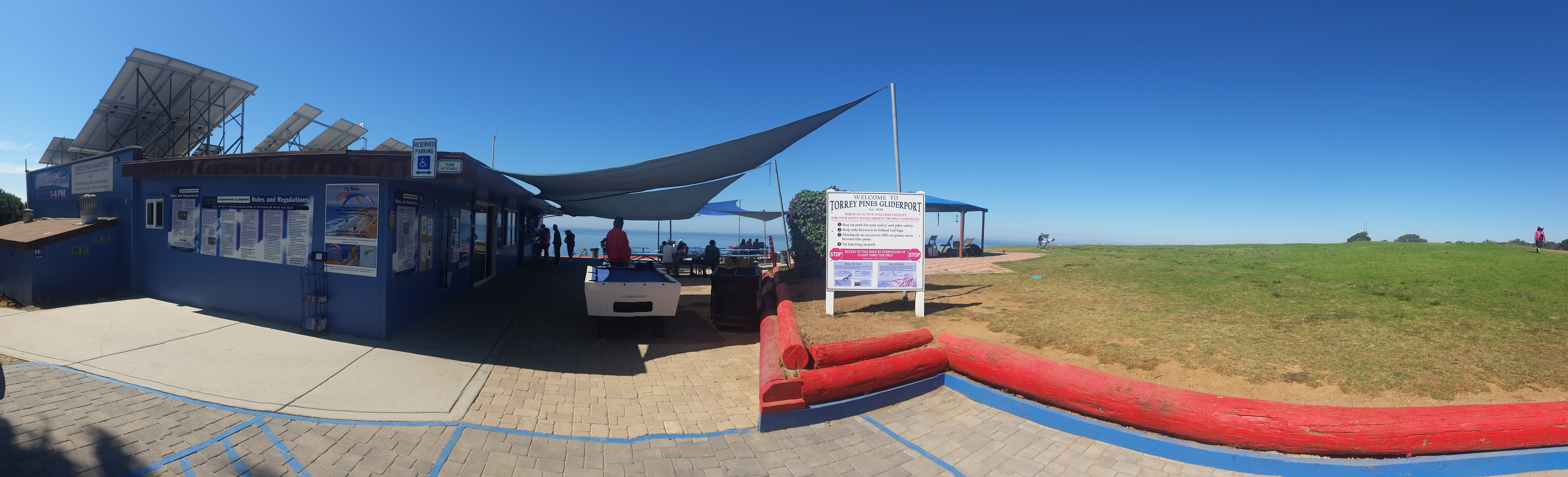
Torrey Pines Gliderport

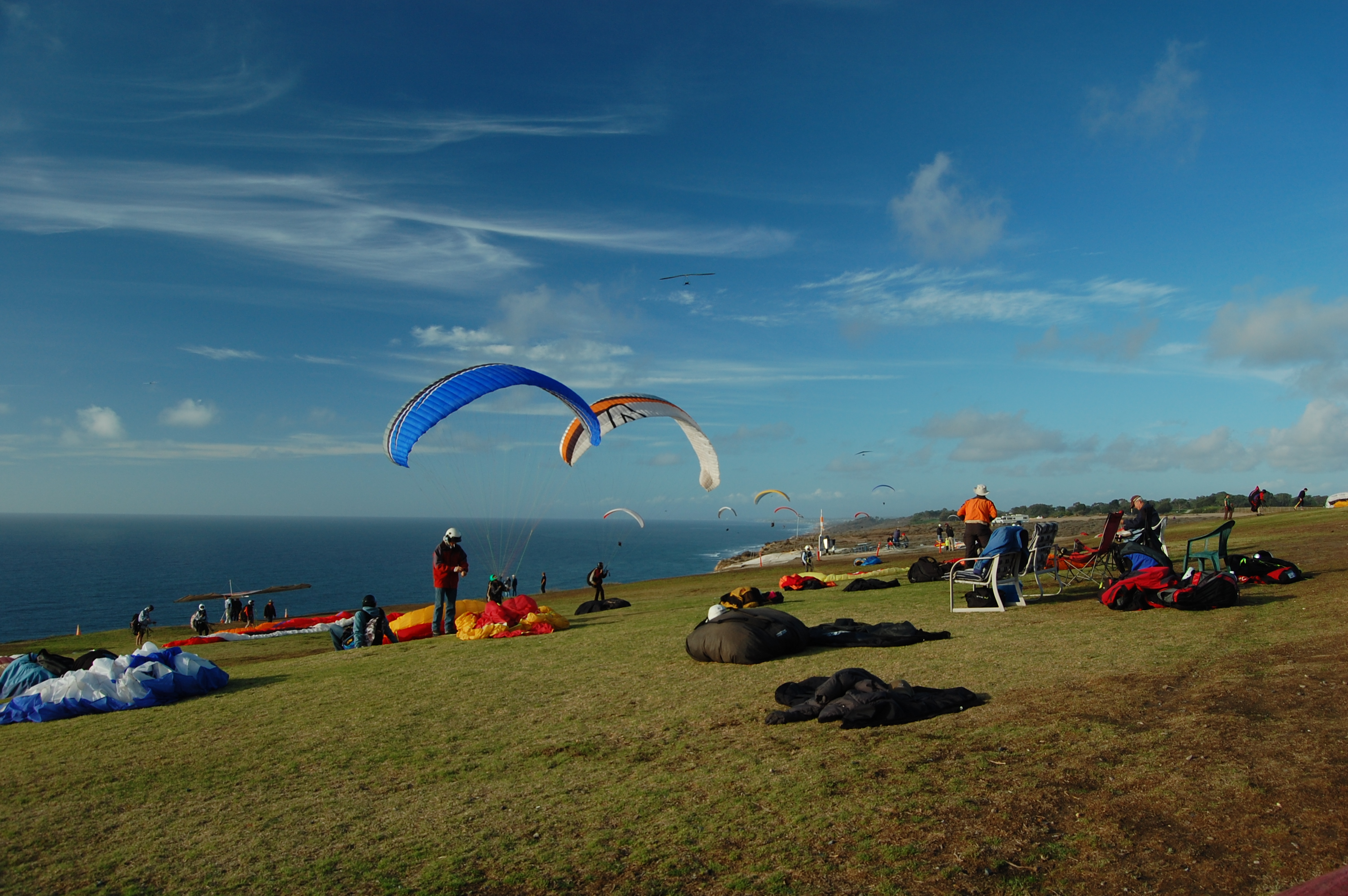
Torrey Pines Gliderport

== Facilities ==
Torrey Pines Gliderport has one runway designated 9/27 with a 1,500 by 30 ft (457 x 9 m) highly eroded asphalt surface. The runway is on property owned by the University of California, San Diego, while the rest of the gliderport is owned by the city of San Diego.

Torrey Pines Gliderport offers paragliding and hang gliding lessons and tandem flights.

Sandwiches, snacks, and drinks can be purchased from the Cliff Hanger Cafe.

== See also ==
- San Diego Historical Landmarks in La Jolla
