= Sunny Jim's Sea Cave =

Cave in California

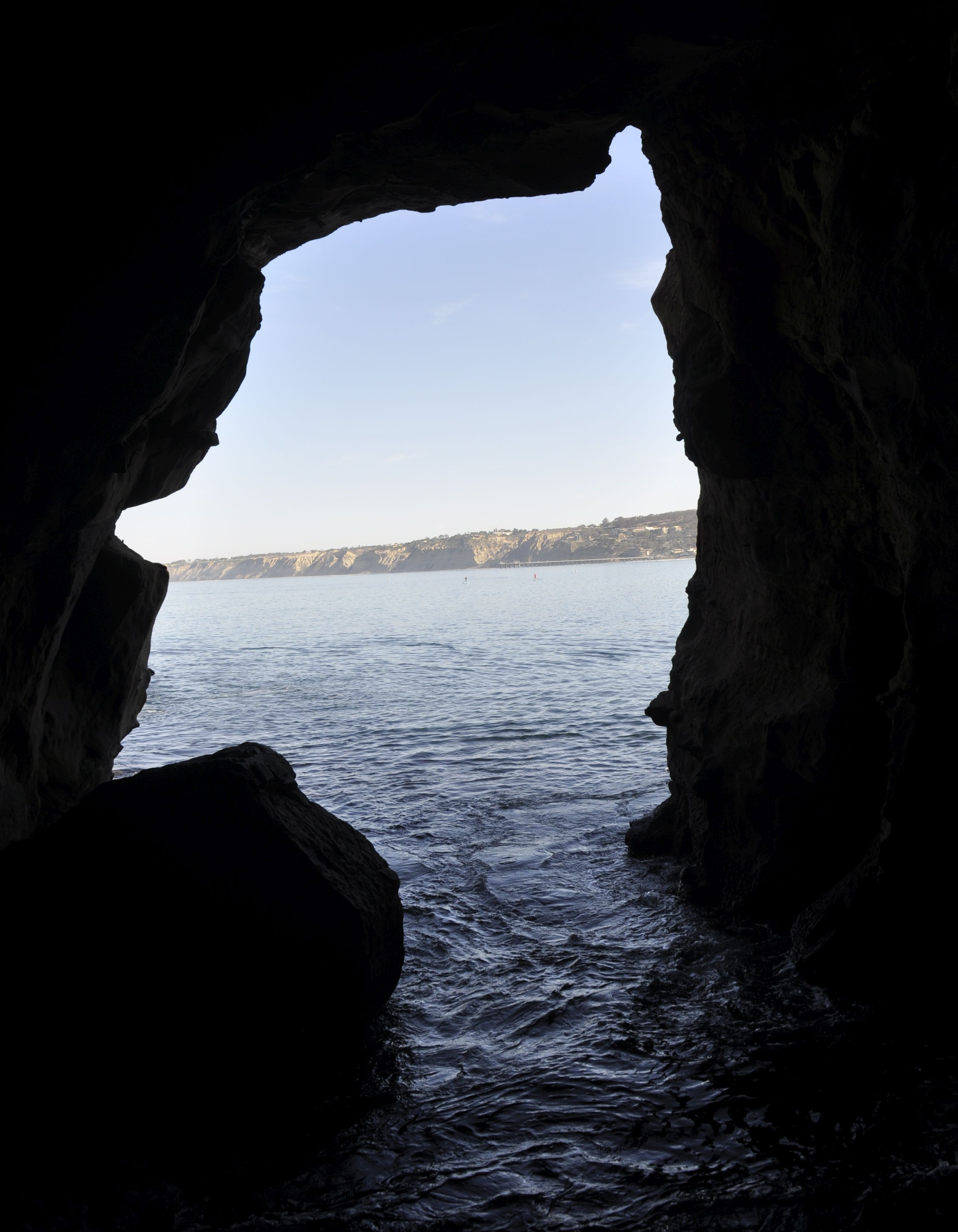
- The cave in 2016

- Location within San Diego County, California Location within California Location within the United States
- Location: San Diego-La Jolla Underwater Park
- Coordinates: 32.8491°N 117.2702°W
- Discovery: 1902
- Visitors: 60,000 (2015)
- Website: www.cavestore.com

San Diego Historic Landmark
- Designated: April 28, 1999
- Reference no.: 380

Sunny Jim's Sea Cave is a cave in the La Jolla community of San Diego, California. It is a popular tourist attraction in the area for its resemblance to the British cereal mascot Sunny Jim. The Cave Store, a gift shop above the cave, offers access to it for a fee. It is also the only underwater cave that can be accessed through land in California.

== History ==
In 1902, German entrepreneur Gustav Schultz hired two Chinese laborers to dig out a tunnel from the gift shop, then Schultz's residence, to the caves below, one of which being Sunny Jim's Sea Cave. Schultz believed that tourists who wanted to access the sea caves below would pay money to use the tunnel. The laborers took two years to dig the entire area out only using a shovel and pickaxe. Schultz began to hold tours in 1905. Originally, the cave was accessed through a rope, but a staircase was created not long after. L. Frank Baum, the author of The Wonderful Wizard of Oz, gave the cave its name. The cave was rumored to be used to transport whiskey illegally into San Diego during the Prohibition era. Bootleggers additionally used the area to transfer opium. The cave may have been also used to smuggle immigrants into the U.S. Jim Allen bought the store in 1994. Before the acquisition, the business mostly made money only from selling seashells.

== The Cave Store ==
The Cave Store was originally the residence of Gustav Schultz. It offers 15 to 20-minute-long group tours to the cave through a 145-step staircase. 90% of the store's revenue comes from entrance fees for the cave. California sea lions can be occasionally heard from the cave. It is possible to access the cave from the ocean, although the store prohibits people from entering the ocean from the viewing platform that visitors reach at the end of the staircase.
