= San Diego-La Jolla Underwater Park =

Protected area in California, United States

Coordinates: 32°51′30″N 117°15′56″W

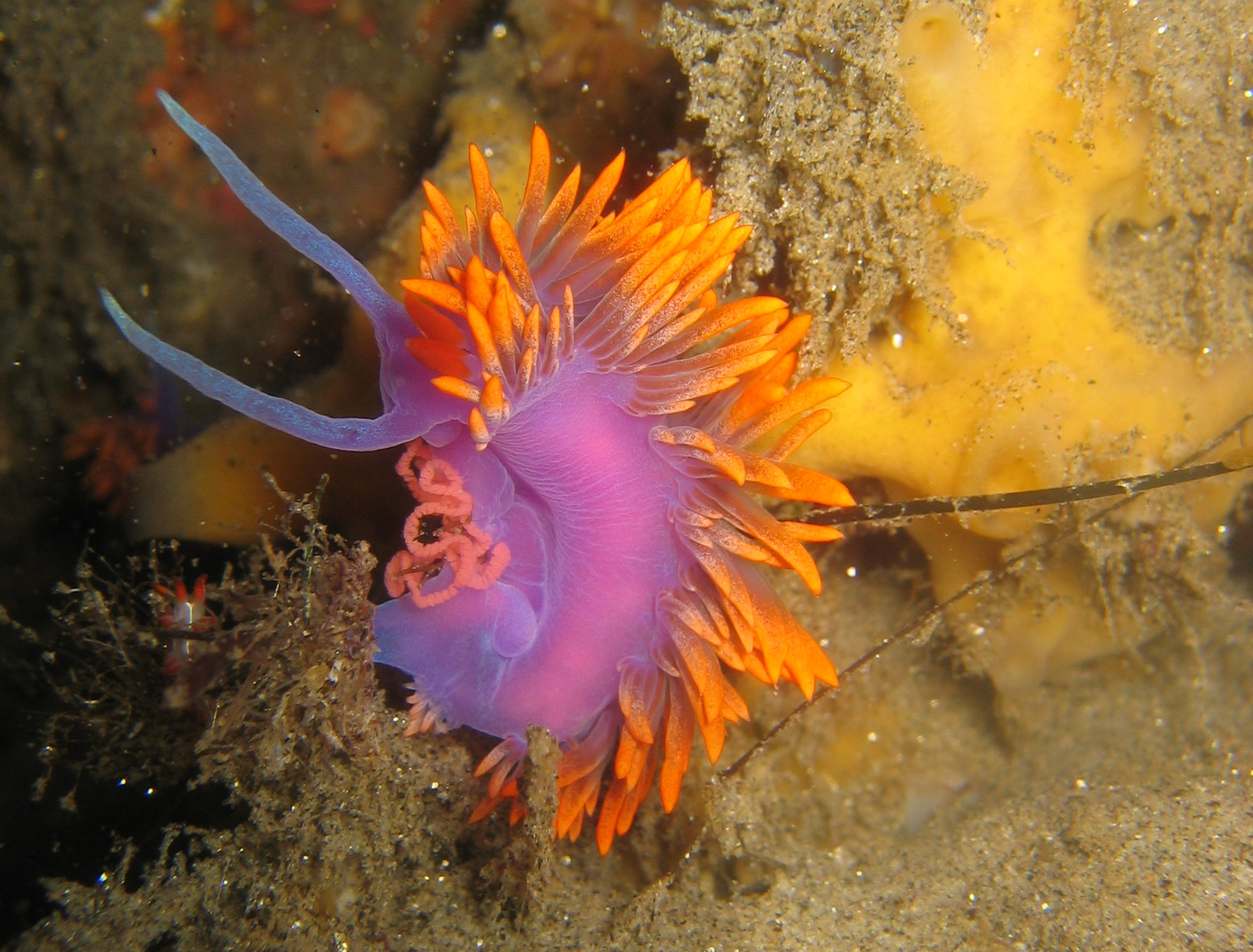
Spanish Shawl (Flabellina iodinea) in Scripps Canyon, La Jolla

The San Diego-La Jolla Underwater Park is the historical name for a marine reserve that includes the San Diego-Scripps Coastal Marine Conservation Area (SMCA) and Matlahuayl State Marine Reserve (SMR), adjoining marine protected areas that extend offshore from La Jolla in San Diego County on California's south coast. The park also protects an important underwater archeological site.

The underwater park originally spanned 6,000 acres (24 km^{2}) of ocean bottom and tidelands, including La Jolla Cove. With four distinct habitats (rocky reef, kelp bed, sand flats, and submarine canyon), the area remains a popular destination for snorkelers and scuba divers.

== History ==
The origins of the park date back to 1929 when the state of California set aside a "marine life refuge" to protect the submerged and intertidal area near Scripps Institution of Oceanography. In 1957, the nearshore area became part of the San Diego Marine Life Refuge.

Environmental activism led to the establishment of the San Diego-La Jolla Underwater Park. The project was spearheaded by the San Diego Council of Divers, led by Harold F. Riley, to protect marine resources threatened by over-fishing. Conrad F. Limbaugh of the Scripps Institution of Oceanography supported the idea. Members of La Jolla's Bottom Scratchers Dive Club, est. 1933, also played a significant role.

In 1970, the City of San Diego incorporated the San Diego-La Jolla Underwater Park as part of a city-operated park that stretched more than 2-miles offshore. Responsibility for maintenance was to be shared by the City of San Diego's Department of Parks and Recreation and the California Department of Fish and Game. A 514-acre ecological reserve and marine life refuge was created at the same time, known as the "Look, Don't Touch Ecological Reserve." In 1981, the San Diego City Council extended the boundaries of the ecological reserve to include La Jolla Cove.

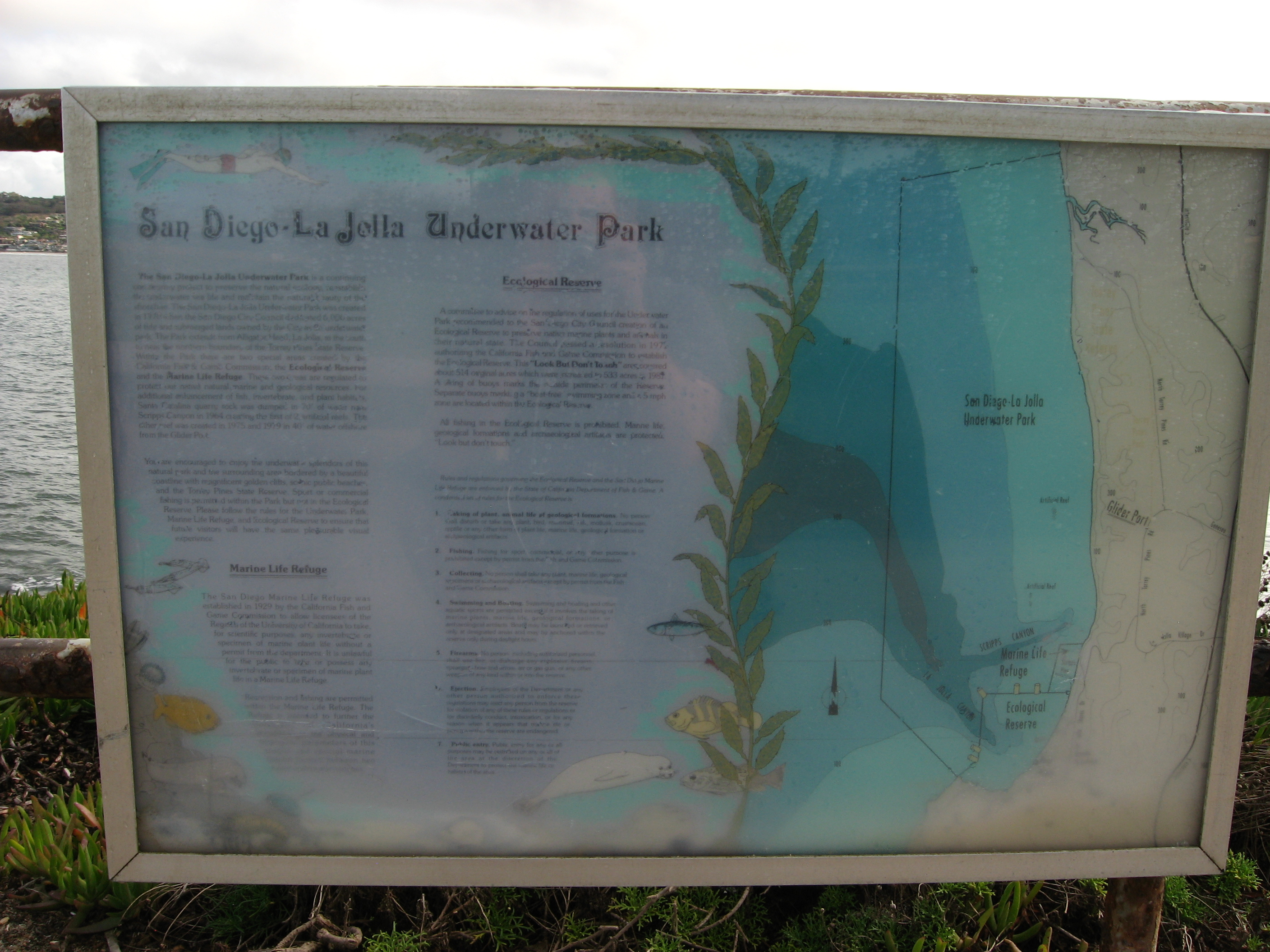
Former San Diego-La Jolla Underwater Park information sign

In 1978, Dr. Bert Kobayashi designed and implemented a survey of the Ecological Reserve, funded by the California State Water Resources Control Board, that detailed the topography and marine life of the area. The Scripps Institution of Oceanography has documented the area thoroughly.

The passage of the Marine Life Management Act in 1998 led to the establishment of San Diego-Scripps Coastal Marine Conservation Area (SMCA) and Matlahuayl State Marine Reserve (SMR) as part of the southern region of California's network of Marine Protected Areas.

== Geography and natural features ==
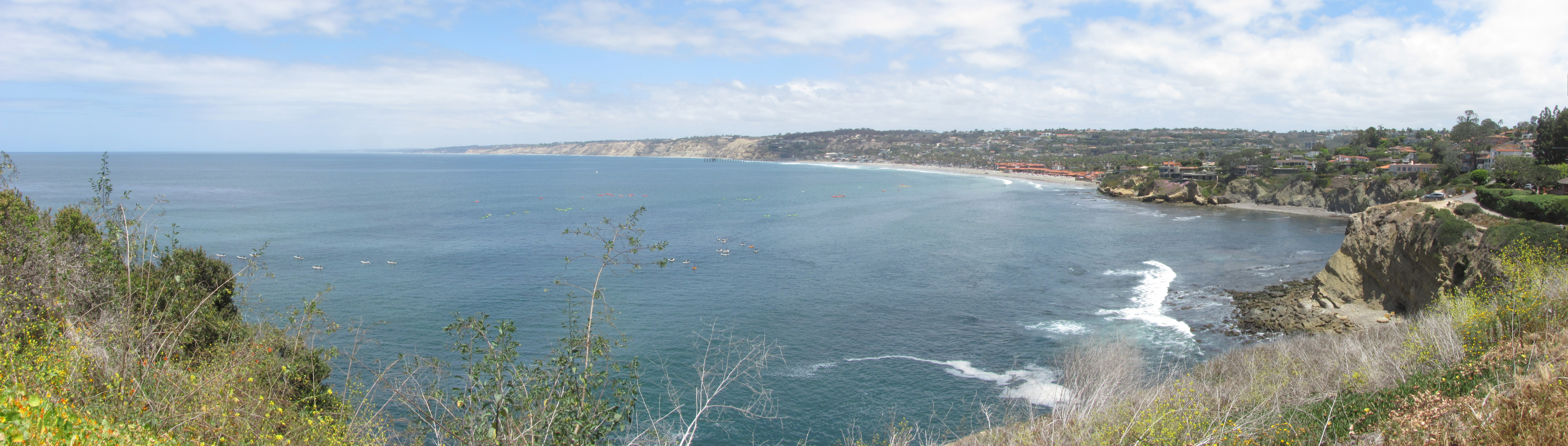
La Jolla Bay

=== La Jolla Submarine Canyon and Scripps Submarine Canyon ===
The submarine canyons of La Jolla and Scripps Canyons are spectacular dive sites, with steep walls that plummet from 70 to 900 feet deep. Many consider the dives here among the best in Southern California.

=== La Jolla Shores ===
The beach is approximately one mile (1.6 km) long and stretches from the sea cliffs just north of La Jolla Cove to Black's Beach south of Torrey Pines State Natural Reserve. La Jolla Shores meets the Scripps Institution of Oceanography campus and Kellogg Park and encompasses Scripps Pier. The southern end of the beach is especially rich with wildlife. During certain times of year, leopard sharks, diamond stingrays, round stingrays, and species of guitarfish are common. Green sea turtles and broadnose sevengill sharks are elusive but can be found farther offshore.

=== La Jolla Cove ===
La Jolla Cove is part of the Matlahuayl State Marine Reserve that covers just over one square mile from shore to depths greater than 330 feet, protecting a mix of sandy beaches, rocky intertidal areas, surfgrass beds, rocky reefs, sea caves, and submarine canyon habitat.

=== The Caves ===
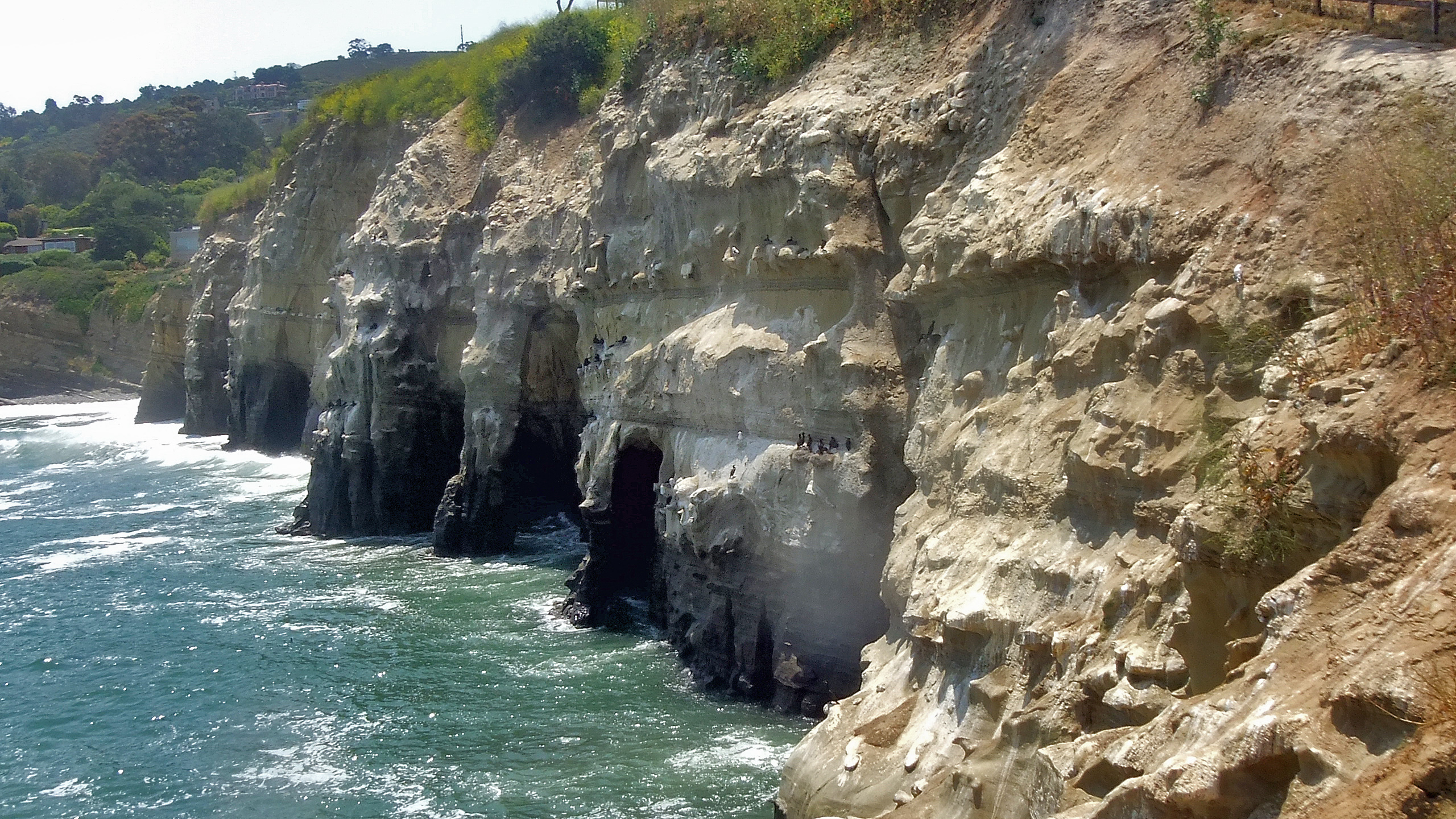
The Seven Caves of La Jolla

The La Jolla sea caves, formerly known as the Mammoth Caves, have been a major tourist attractions since the late 1800s. Located east of La Jolla Cove, the seven sea caves were naturally sculpted into the base of a 75-million-year-old sandstone sea cliff. At low tide the caves are accessible from the ocean, but only one (Sunny Jim's Sea Cave), is accessible from land. Visitors can enter Sunny Jim Cave via a tunnel which was dug in the early 1900s from the historical landmark, The Cave Store, located on the cliff above on Cave Street.

== Regulations ==
Matlahuayl State Marine Reserve: It is unlawful to injure, damage, take, or possess any living, geological, or cultural marine resource. California Code of Regulations Title 14, Section 632(b)(142)

San Diego-Scripps Coastal Marine Conservation Area: It is unlawful to injure, damage, take, or possess any living, geological, or cultural marine resource, EXCEPT: Recreational take of coastal pelagic species except market squid (northern anchovy, Pacific sardine, Pacific mackerel, and jack mackerel), by hook-and-line only is allowed. California Code of Regulations Title 141, Section 632(b)(14)

== Highlights of the "Look, Don't Touch Ecological Reserve" ==
Highlights of the Ecological Reserve, ca. 1994, now the Matlahuayl State Marine Reserve (SMR).

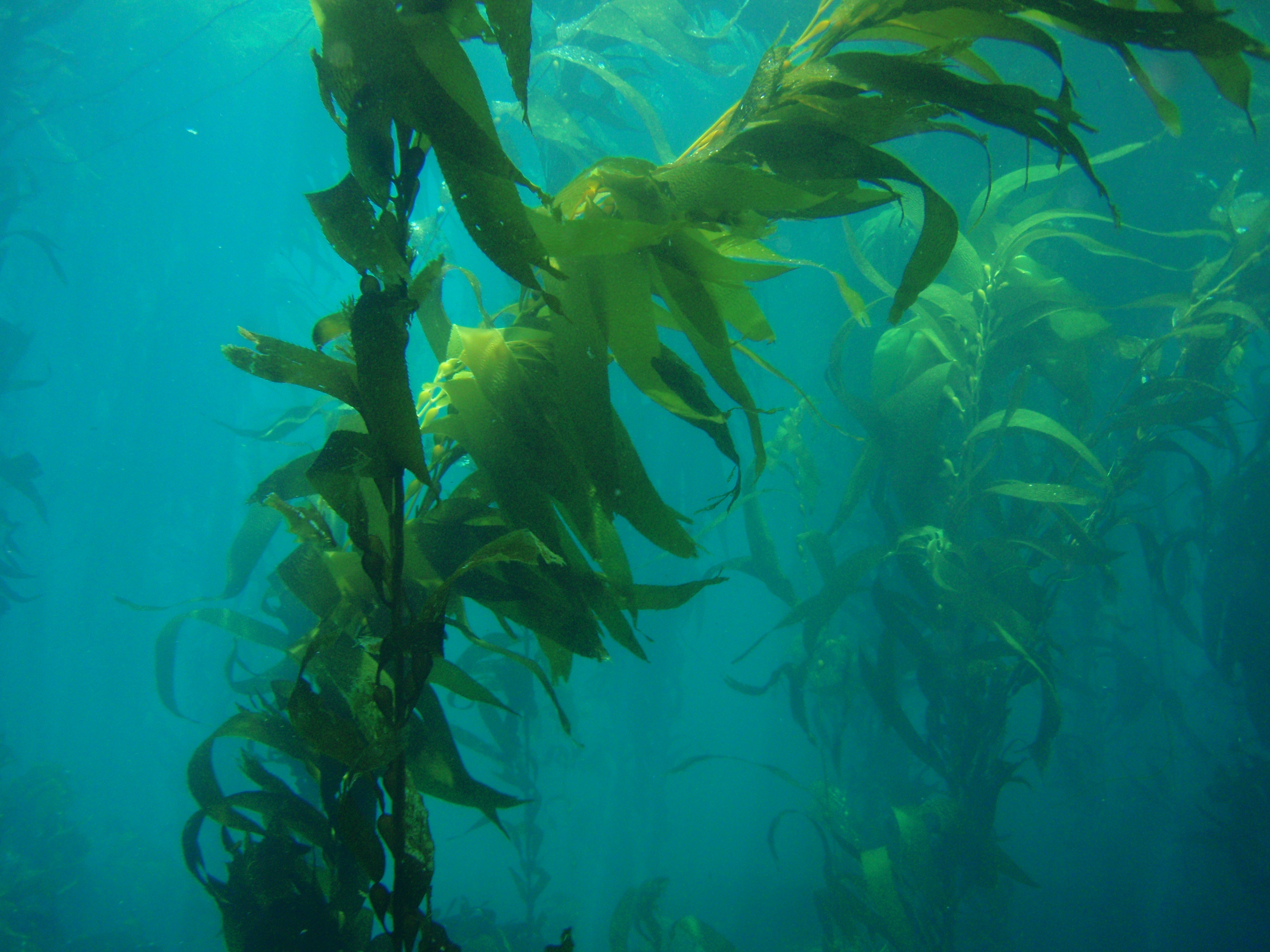
Giant Kelp

=== Marine Plants and Algae ===
- Giant Kelp (Macrocystis)
- Feather Boa Kelp (Egregia)
- Braided Hair (Plocamium coccineum var. pacificum)
- Surf Grass (Phyllospadix scouleri)
- Sulfur Sponge (Aplysina fistularis)

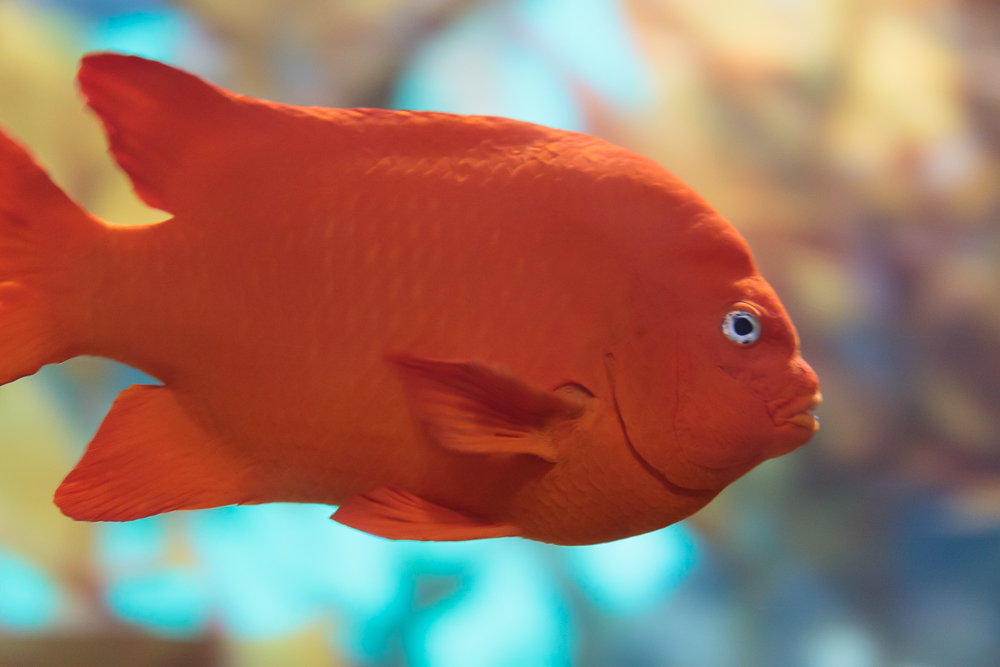
Garibaldi, or Catalina goldfish

=== Invertebrates and Sea Snails ===
- Aggregating anemone (Anthopleura elegantissima)
- Sand-Castle Worm (Phragmatopoma californica)
- Mossy Chiton (Mopalia muscosa)
- Green Abalone (Haliotis fulgens)
- Giant Keyhole Limpet (Megathura crenulate)
- Owl Limpet (Lottia gigantea)
- Norris’s Top Snail (Norrisia norrisii)
- Wavy Turban Snail (Megastraea undosa)
- Kellet’s Whelk (Kelletia kelletii)

=== Octopus, Lobster, Crab, Sea Star ===
- Verrill’s two-spot octopus (Octopus bimaculatus)
- California spiny lobster (Panulirus interruptus)
- Striped Shore Crab (Pachygrapsus crassipes)
- Giant Sea Star (Pisaster giganteus)

=== Fish, Rays, and Sharks ===
- Leopard Shark (Triakis semifasciata)
- Round stingray (Urobatis helleri)
- Bat ray (Myliobatis californica)
- California moray (Gymnothorax mordax)
- Pacific Sardine (Sardinops)
- Topsmelt (Atherinops affinis)
- Black & Yellow Rockfish (Sebastes chrysomelas)
- Cabezon ((Scorpaenichthys marmoratus)Scorpaenichthys marmoratus)
- Kelp bass (Paralabrax clathratus)
- Sargo (Anisotremus davidsonii)
- Opaleye (Girella nigricans)
- Zebra Perch (Kyphosus azureus)
- Halfmoon (Medialuna californiensis)
- Kelp Perch (Brachyistius frenatus)
- Black Surfperch (Embiotoca jacksoni)
- Walleye Surfperch (Hyperprosopon argenteum)
- Garibaldi damselfish, or Catalina goldfish (Hypsypops rubicundus)
- Blacksmith (Chromis punctipinnis)
- Senorita ( Oxyjulis californica)
- Rock Wrasse (Halichoeres semicinctus)
- California Sheephead (Semicossyphus pulcher)
- Giant kelpfish (Heterostichus rostratus)
- California Halibut (Paralichthys californicus)

=== Birds ===
- Brown Pelican (Pelecanus occidentalis)
- Brandt’s Cormorant (Urile penicillatus)

=== Marine Mammals ===
- California Sea Lion (Zalophus californianus)
- Harbor Seal (Phoca vitulina)

== Public Art ==
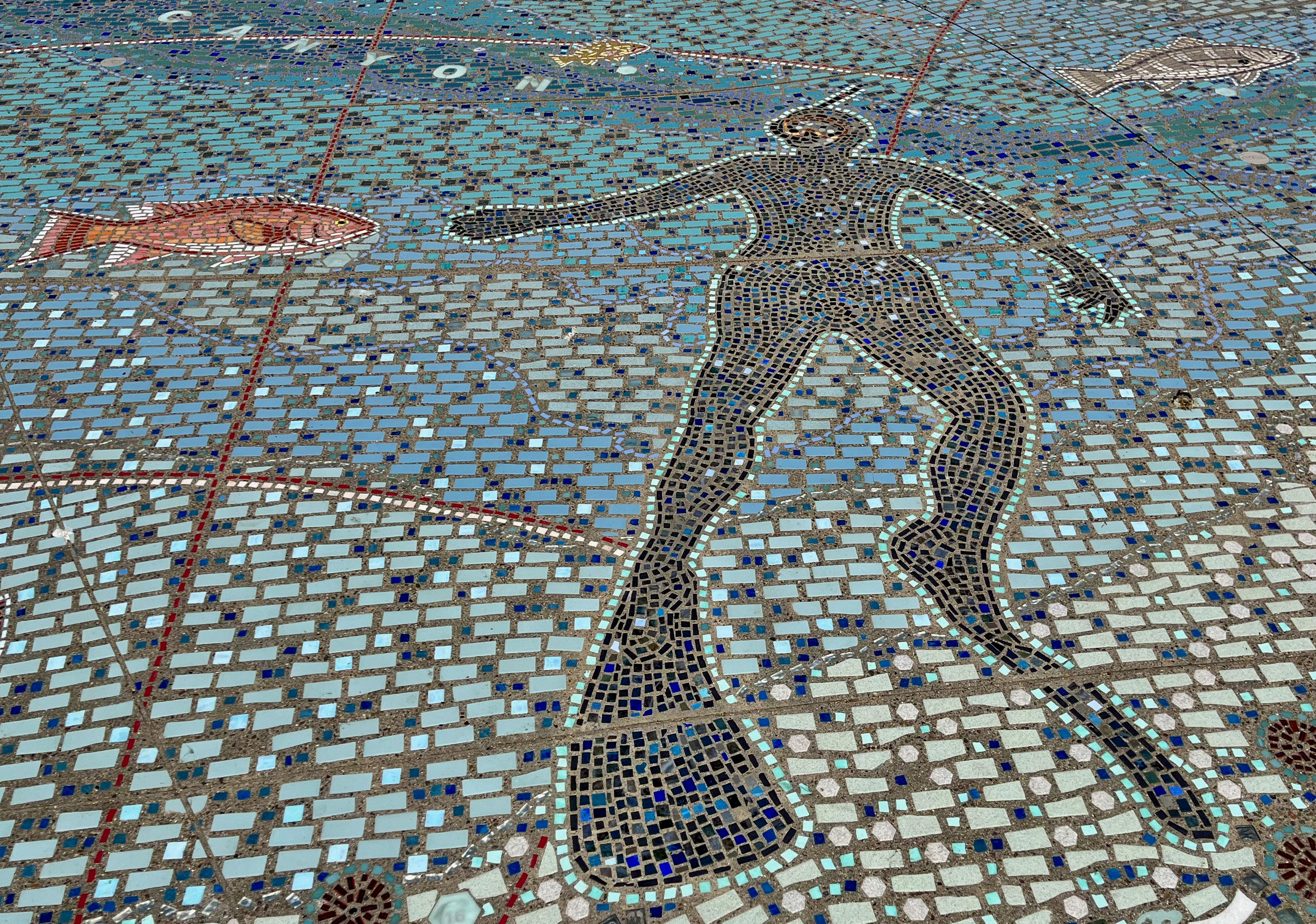
Diver, Map of the Grand Canyons of La Jolla, Kellogg Park

A Map of the Grand Canyons of La Jolla, located at Kellogg Park in La Jolla Shores, was opened to the public in October 2020. The 2,200-square-foot mosaic map, embedded in the ground, shows more than 100 life-size images of creatures found just offshore. Significant underwater canyons are indicated by varying shades of blue to mark ocean depths. The mosaic was made using a process called LithoMosaic. The project was sponsored by the Walter Munk Foundation for the Oceans, among other community groups.

In 2023, a 4-000 lb. bronze topographic map of the La Jolla Canyon was installed at Kellogg Park in La Jolla, titled “From the Heights of Mount Soledad to the Depths of the Grand Canyons of La Jolla.”

== See also ==
- San Diego-Scripps Coastal Marine Conservation Area
- Brueggeman, Peter. La Jolla Canyon and Scripps Canyon Bibliography. 2007.
- Garfield, Judith Lea. The San Diego-La Jolla Underwater Park Ecological Reserve: A Field Guide. 2 Vols. San Diego: Picaro Publishing, 1994-2000.
- Google Arts & Culture: La Jolla's Coastal Legacy
