= Los Peñasquitos Lagoon =

Coastal marsh in California, US

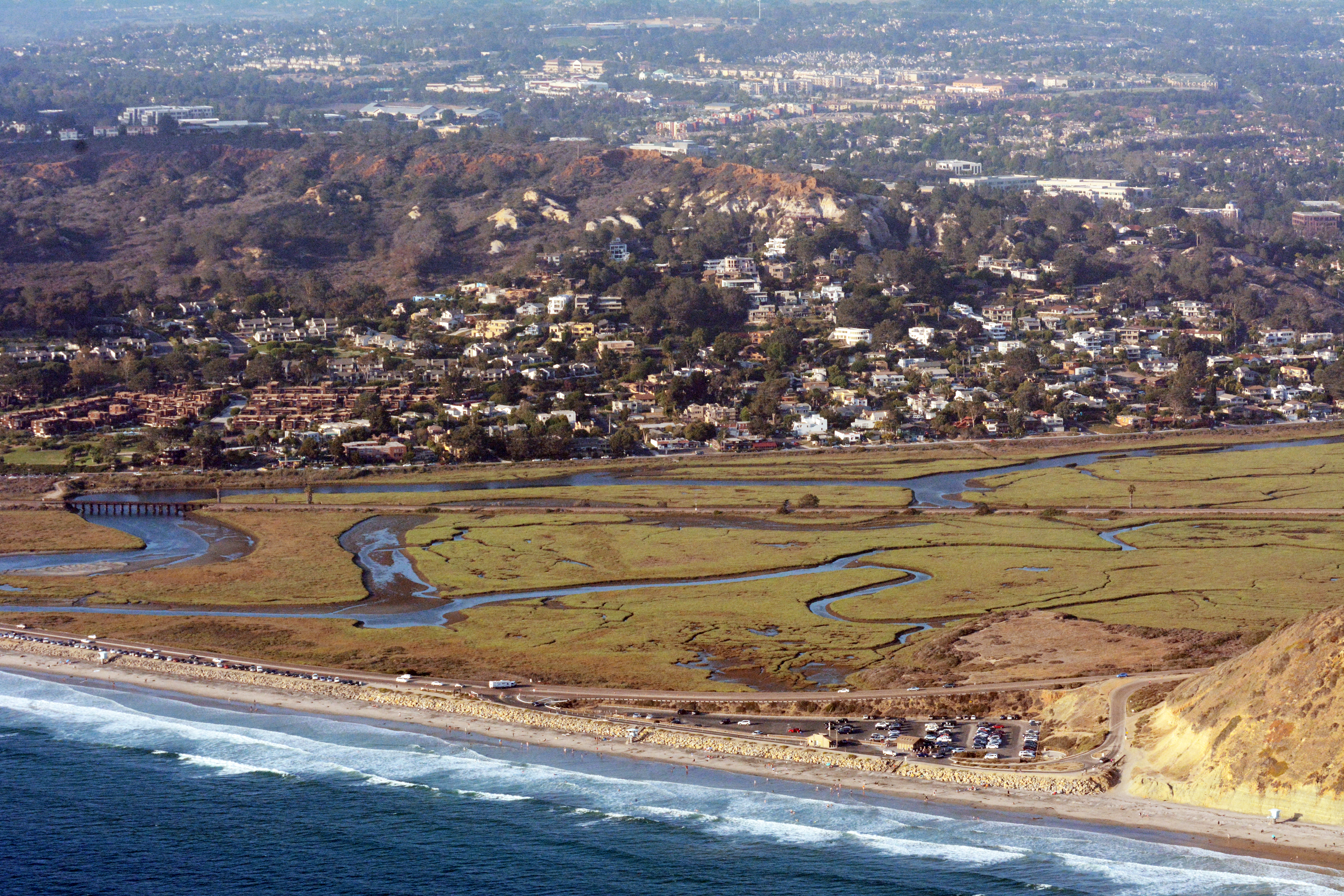
Aerial Photo of the Los Peñasquitos Lagoon July 2014

Los Peñasquitos Lagoon and Torrey Pines State Natural Reserve in 2018

Los Peñasquitos Marsh Natural Preserve and Lagoon is a coastal marsh in San Diego County, California, United States situated at the northern edge of the City of San Diego, forming the natural border with Del Mar, California. This bar-built estuary divides a colony of the endangered Torrey pine on a narrow coastal strip. Three streams empty into the lagoon: Carroll Creek, Carmel Creek, and Los Peñasquitos Creek, with a total drainage basin area of 95 square miles.

== Names ==
The name "Los Peñasquitos" is Spanish for "The Little Cliffs" or "crags". Previously the lagoon was also called Cordero Slough or Cordero Delta (named after late 18th century settlers), Soledad Lagoon, Torrey Pines Lagoon, and Sorrento Lagoon.

== Physical and natural aspects ==
The mouth of Carmel Creek is in the northern part of the lagoon, Los Peñasquitos and Carroll creeks flow through the Los Peñasquitos Canyon and Carroll Canyon respectively, then merge in Sorrento Valley and drain into the lagoon from the south. Los Peñasquitos Creek has by far largest drainage area (about 70% of the total basin). Historically, the streams were seasonal, usually drying out in summer. After urbanization of the surrounding areas the streams became perennial due to the irrigation runoff with winter flows to summer flows ratio from 16:1 (Carmel Valley Creek) to 58:1 (Los Peñasquitos).

The wetlands inside the lagoon are spread over about 500 acres.

=== Historical configurations ===
Due to the fast rise of the sea level at the end of the last glacial period (6000 years BP) the lagoon became a deep bay with the rocky shores. As the sea level rise slowed down, the sediment carried by the streams started to accumulate, and the sandy beaches appeared around 4000 years BP. With sea level stabilization, the lagoon by 3600 years BP turned into a brackish marsh and by 2800 years BP became a salt marsh.

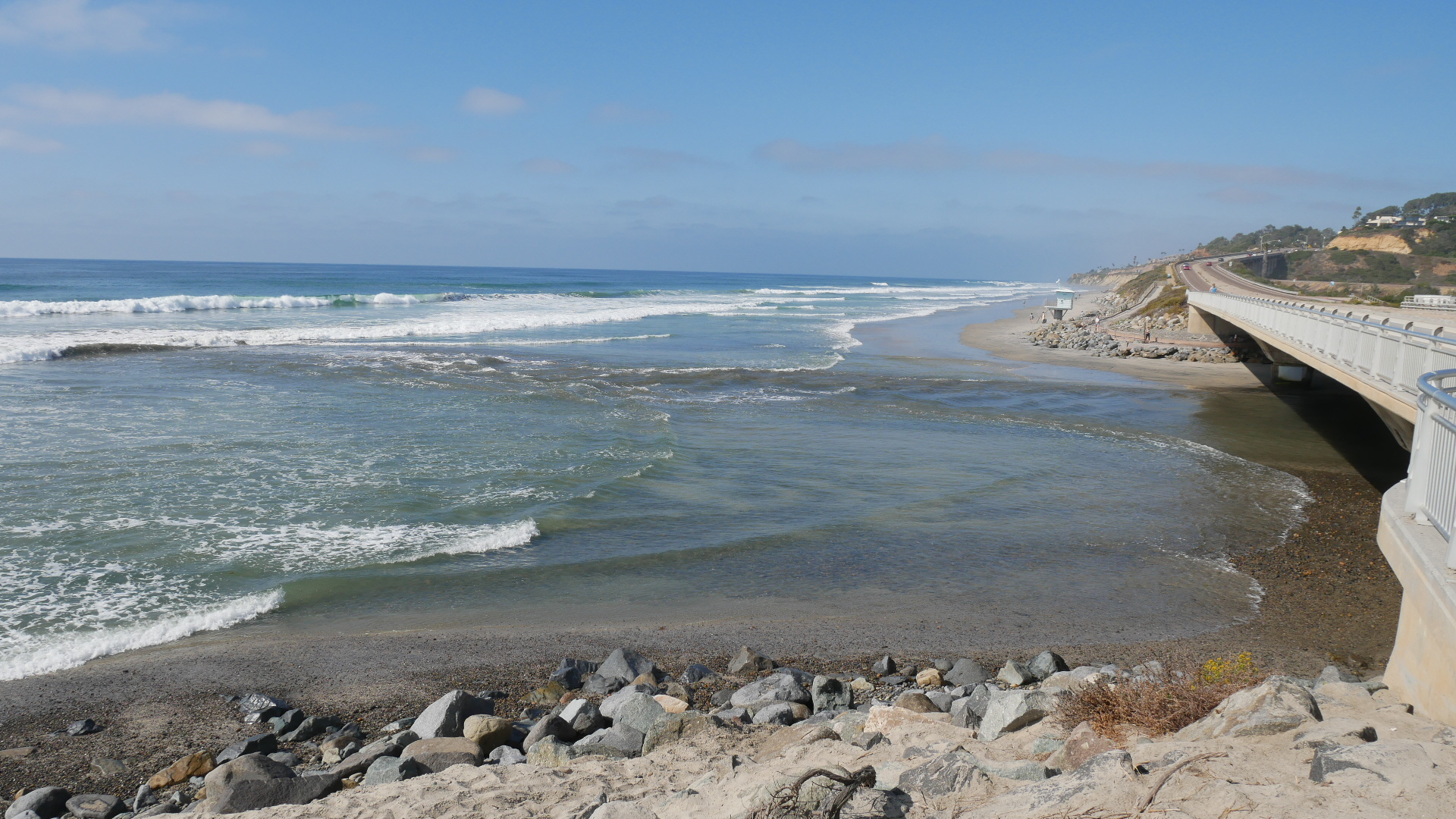
Fresh water from the Los Peñasquitos Lagoon mixes with salt water from the ocean, creating a mix of brackish water.

Until the late 19th century, the lagoon went inland for as much as 1.75 miles, its salt marshes, salt flats, and mud flats/open water occupied approximately 380 acres, with salt marshes constituting about 72% of the area. The lagoon was almost separated from the ocean by the sand and dune barrier that was about 300 feet wide and up to 30 feet high. Few tidal channels merged into a single large channel at the northern part of the beach. Historically, the mouth of the channel (inlet of the lagoon) was open and closed intermittently. A "high wall composed of small rocks" was located along the beach side of the lagoon (the route of the modern North Torrey Pines Road). This barrier was mined for cobbles that were used to pave the streets of San Diego.

== Human impact ==
Most of the freshwater entering the Los Peñasquitos Lagoon arrives from Los Peñasquitos Canyon via Los Peñasquitos Creek. For many years, the Los Peñasquitos Lagoon had evolved from a tidal estuary to a lagoon that was closed to tidal action for long periods of time. Since becoming a part of the State Park System, there have been a number of changes that have increased the tidal action within the lagoon.

=== History ===
During the prehistoric period, as early as 6000–5000 years BP, the Kumeyaay tribe collected scallops, chione clams, and oysters in the area; few archeologic sites exist around the lagoon, including the village of Ystagua (existed since 1300 BP) in the modern-day Sorrento Valley.

In the 19th century the valley was used for crops, with Rancho Los Peñasquitos being the first land grant (1823) within the limits of the modern San Diego County. First railroad line, a California Southern Railroad link between National City and Oceanside passed through the eastern part of the area in 1881–1882, with a "Beach Shingle" spur line (also known as “Sea Wall Spur”) running on the north side to the beach in order to transport the construction materials used to pave the streets in San Diego. The new Santa Fe Railroad line went through the center of the lagoon in early 1900s, and Pacific Coast Highway in 1912-1915 (the latter was expanded in 1932–1933, with “Sorrento Overhead” providing a railroad overpass). In 1965–1967, Interstate 5 was built, North Beach parking lot followed in 1968. As a result, three transportation links intersect the lagoon: Highway 101 runs along the beach on the western side, Santa Fe Railroad line crosses in the center, Interstate 5 lies in the east.

=== Freshwater inflow ===
The urbanization of the surrounding area caused an inflow of fresh water in the summer months due to irrigation runoff ("urban drool"), the resulting changes in habitat were beneficial to mosquito Culex tarsalis, a carrier of the encephalitis and West Nile virus diseases.

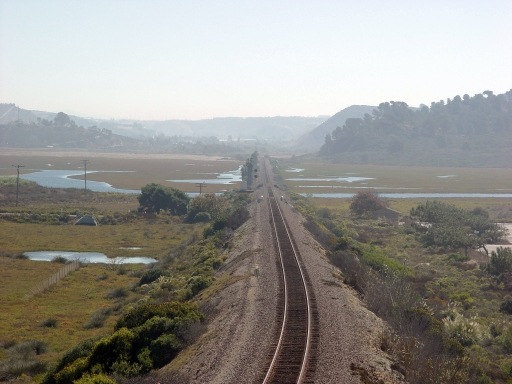
Railroad causeway crossing Los Peñasquitos Lagoon

=== Railroad causeway ===
Originally, the railroad tracks travelled straight from Sorrento Valley on the eastern side of the Lagoon and ran parallel north of what is now Carmel Valley Road, therefore the impact on the tidal circulation and the mouth was much smaller than for the other lagoons nearby. However, in 1925, the Santa Fe Railroad built a single-track roadbed causeway embankment down the center of the lagoon for its Surf Line, which still is in use today on a daily basis by the Coaster and Pacific Surfliner as well as BNSF Railway freight trains. This embankment severely restricted the normal historical lagoon drainage for the first time, and changed the tidal flow and current pattern. The four original wooden trestle bridges crossing the lagoon (three over the water and one over the McGonigle Road) were replaced between 2015 and 2017 with new concrete bridges to help modernize the railroad traffic to and from San Diego. Even though the bridges were replaced, this area was not double-tracked because it is possible that these tracks will eventually be bypassed by a two-track tunnel underneath Del Mar.

=== Highway 101 ===
When the Pacific Coast Highway (U.S. Route 101 in California) was expanded in the 1930s, the roadbed along the beach was heightened, and a bridge was built over the mouth the lagoon. This bridge had many wooden pilings that easily got clogged with sand and debris, impacting the water transfer between the ocean and lagoon.

=== Sewage treatment effluent ===
Over the years, at least three different waste water treatment plants have pumped their treating effluent into the lagoon. The Callan Treatment plant pumped 50,000 US gallons (190,000 L) per day during the 1950s; the Sorrento plant produced 500,000 US gallons (1,900,000 L) per day starting in 1962; and the Pomerado Waste Water Treatment Plant pumped treated sewage into the lagoon from 1962 to 1972.

=== North Beach Parking Lot ===
The triangular North Beach Parking Lot was built in 1968. It is accessible via Carmel Valley Road at McGonigle Road / Del Mar Scenic Parkway, and is bounded on three sides by the arch bridge at North Torrey Pines Road, the railroad causeway, and the lagoon's ocean inlet. Previous to the State Park, there had been a number of tourist beach houses in the area, called Sunken City, that had been moved from the open beach during the 1932 construction of the large causeway for North Torrey Pines Bridge.

According to LPL Foundation and the State Coastal Conservancy, this fully paved parking lot significantly altered the lagoon's hydrology.

=== Sediment deposition ===
Due to the high rate of sediment deposition that surpasses the federally-mandated total maximum daily load, Los Peñasquitos Lagoon is listed as a category 5 impaired body of water under section 303(d) of the Clean Water Act. This is primarily due to the adverse effects of sedimentation in the lagoon itself and also within its vast watershed. These effects include drops in photosynthetic productivity, higher concentrations of heavy metals, and overall loss of ecosystem biodiversity within the estuary. In addition to ecological impacts, sedimentation in the Los Peñasquitos watershed has led to significant issues within its storm water infrastructure. Specifically, sediment accumulation in flood control channels has greatly reduced original storm water conveyance capacity. This is primarily due to the vegetation that grows within the channels as a result of siltation. Regular maintenance of these channels by the Storm Water Division is therefore a necessity to ensure proper flood control. Despite the need for sufficient flood control through regular channel maintenance, the extensive permitting process involved requires selection and planning that extends nearly two years before any service activities.

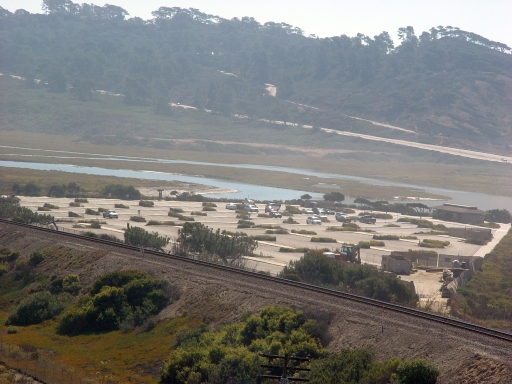
North Beach Parking Lot

== Restoration and preservation ==
M.H.S. Elwany in 2011 named the following main threats to the ecosystem of the lagoon:

- lagoon mouth closures cause increase of salinity (from brackish conditions to hypersaline), causing reduced biodiversity (for example, in the eastern part of the lagoon pickleweed displaces the California cordgrass);
- sedimentation increase due to greater water flow from the creeks. Deposits cause a loss of salt marsh, turning it into the coastal scrub or riparian habitat;
- increased freshwater runoff also reduces the salt marsh area, turning this habitat into the riparian or cattail marsh.

Elwany named the following potential low-cost improvements:

- keeping the lagoon inlet open and excavating the main lagoon channel; these measures will increase the water circulation;
- creating new flow channels to divert the freshwater into the main channel;
- removing the deposits in the east of the lagoon and adding new tidal channels there;
- adding a catch basin for the freshwater runoff and pumping the water into the storm drain;
- removing the invasive plants; recreating salt marshes and salt pannes;
- reducing future sedimentation by either adding the sediment basins or improving the water management in the new developments in the area;
- decreasing the pollution through education of the populace;
- setting aside wildlife corridors.

=== California State Parks ===
The California Division of Parks and Recreation has designated the status of Los Peñasquitos Lagoon as a State Preserve, which has much more restricted access than the State Park designation. There is very limited public use of Los Peñasquitos Marsh Natural Preserve, with most of the area signed as "Do Not Enter". The California State Preserve status is granted to only the rarest and most fragile of the state owned lands.

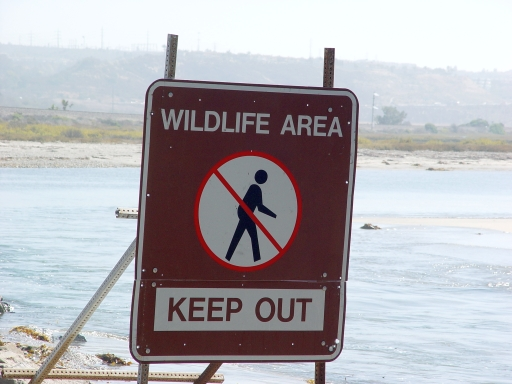
Sign at the mouth of the lagoon

The State Preserve covers the saltwater lagoon area of over 630 acres (2.5 km^{2}) adjacent to Torrey Pines State Beach and Torrey Pines State Natural Reserve. An additional 240 acres (0.97 km^{2}) of marshland was added to this California State Parkland in 1987, when it was purchased from SDG&E for $2.25 million. SDG&E has originally purchased the land in 1966 as a possible site for a new nuclear power plant that was never built.

=== Los Peñasquitos Lagoon Enhancement Plan ===
In 1985, the California Coastal Conservancy created the Los Peñasquitos Lagoon Enhancement Plan to deal with a number of human-caused problems. A lagoon management program is now in place to monitor water quality, manage the manual removal of sand and debris upon lagoon mouth closures, give oversight and recommendations for improved usage, and coordinate with other agencies to protect and restore the lagoon. The Los Peñasquitos Lagoon Foundation, formed in 1983, is 501 3(c) non-profit and is the management entity charged with implementing the enhancement plan in coordination with State Parks and the State Coastal Conservancy. More information on Los Peñasquitos Lagoon and its watershed, the Los Peñasquitos Lagoon Foundation (LPLF) and resource management within the lagoon and its watershed can be found at the following website: lospenasquitos.org

=== Managed breaches ===
The mouth of the lagoon is a subject to periodical (1-3 times a year) managed breaches in order to improve water quality (to improve low oxygen levels) and regulate water level to reduce the disease vector for brain encephalitis and West Nile virus transmitted through Culex tarsalis mosquito. The management program is developed by Los Peñasquitos Lagoon Foundation and California State Parks is being implemented since 1985 with input from Pacific Estuarine Research Laboratory and the Tijuana River NERR. The closure of the mouth typically occurs due to strong waves in winter/spring time causing the sand deposits (in summer, the tidal flows usually provide effective protection against the smaller waves). The shallowness of the lagoon allows the sunlight to penetrate the whole depth of the water thus allowing the photosynthesis. Coupled with the wind water-mixing action, this allows maintenance of the oxygen level in the lagoon for few weeks after a mouth closure. However, longer periods of closure cause hypoxia and thus trigger a mechanical breach with utilization of heavy construction equipment. Post-breach flushing causes the water levels to slightly recede and the salinity to drop briefly, but significantly.

=== New bridge over lagoon mouth ===
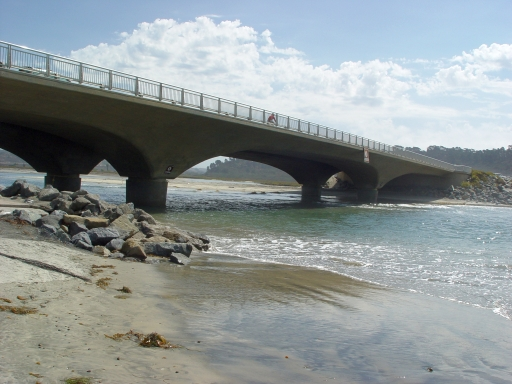
Seaward side of the new bridge

In 2005 a new bridge was built over the mouth of the lagoon. The new bridge replaced the existing bridge's 72 pilings with just four that support a much longer span across a larger mouth opening.

This new bridge is sometimes called North Torrey Pines Bridge, although that same name is sometimes applied to the taller arch bridge immediately to its north. This lower bridge over the lagoon inlet was built by Flatiron and cost $9,628,750.

=== Pump Station 64 ===
The City of San Diego's waste water treatment and pumping stations have been improved and replaced over the years so that they do not pump treated effluent directly into the lagoon any more. Pump Station 64 is located in an industrial area at the very far upstream end of the lagoon, near the Sorrento Valley Coaster Station. Pump Station 64 has often malfunctioned and spilled millions of gallons of raw sewage directly into Los Penasquitos Lagoon, in fact between 1977 and 1986 there were 60 such spills. There were a number of improvements and fixes made, with a new $23 million facility being completed in 1988. This helped considerably in keeping the lagoon much cleaner once the new station came on-line, however there are still spills, with the most recent being on September 9, 2011, when an estimated 1.9 million US gallons (7,200 m^{3}) of raw sewage was released due to a county-wide power outage.

Pump Station 64 is located at 10745 Roselle Street, San Diego, California, just east of Interstate 5.

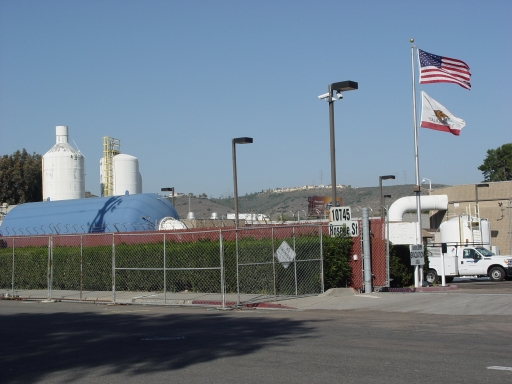
Pump Station 64

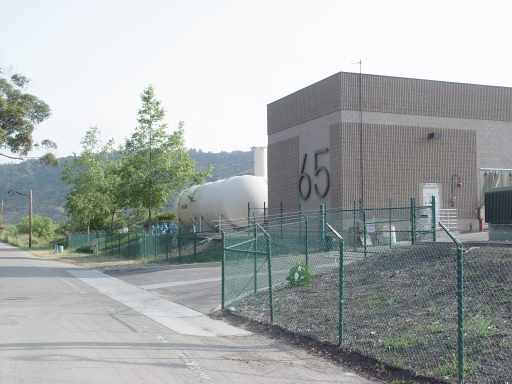
Pump Station 65

=== Pump Station 65 ===
Pump Station 65 was rebuilt and relocated in 1996 to sit on the edge of the lagoon next to a now-closed portion of Sorrento Valley Road. Pump Station 65 is a modern building, and pumps an estimated 19 million US gallons (72,000 m^{3}) per day south to Pump Station 64. The sewage lines and pumping station located in the lagoon area are slated for retirement. Pump Station 65 is planned to be relocated out of Los Peñasquitos Lagoon along with associated relocation and upgrading of major trunk sewers.

Pump Station 65 is located at 12112 Sorrento Valley Road, San Diego, California.

=== Closure of Sorrento Valley Road ===
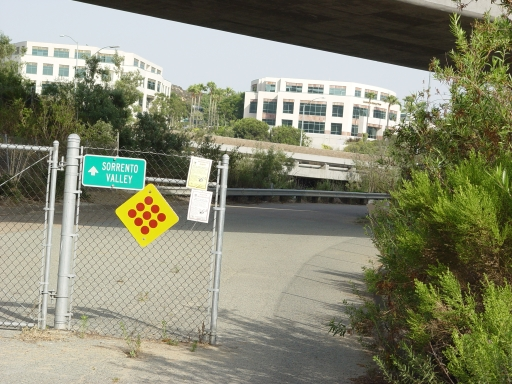
north end of the closed section of Sorrento Valley Road

In 1996, the northernmost portion of Sorrento Valley Road skirting the very edge of the lagoon between Carmel Valley Road and Carmel Mountain Road was closed in order to build Pump Station 65. The road remained closed during the Interstate 5/805/56 interchange improvements, and on February 25, 2003, the San Diego City Council voted to permanently close it and convert the corridor to a bike path/multi-use trail. Closing the road has improved access to a wildlife corridor for deer, fox, coyote, bobcat and spotted skunk to enter and exit the Preserve.

== Dangers ==
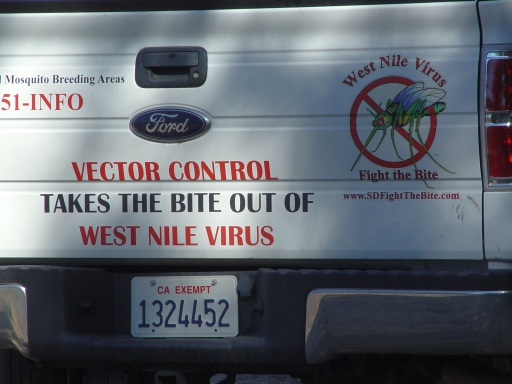
Truck on North Torrey Pines Road that sprays for mosquitoes.

=== West Nile Virus ===
Los Peñasquitos Lagoon is one of the known breeding grounds in California of mosquitoes infected with the West Nile virus (WNV), a virus that originated in Uganda and arrived in California in 2003. The number of yearly incidents of WNV infection in San Diego County has been rising since 2008. The virus is often fatal to birds, which is the primary animal affected, but horses and humans have also died from it. One in five infected humans will show flu-like symptoms, and will sometimes require hospitalization for meningitis. In 2009 one boy developed flu-like symptoms and became delirious a few days after having had a picnic near Los Peñasquitos Lagoon, and needed to be hospitalized for WNV infection, presumably acquired by mosquito bite. Pickup trucks can sometimes be seen around the lagoon spraying for mosquitoes to prevent the spread of WNV.

=== Rattlesnakes ===
Rattlesnakes are found throughout San Diego County, and a warning sign along the Marsh Trail reminds hikers that rattlesnakes are also found in the marsh area.

=== Mountain Lions ===
Although mountain lions (Felis concolor) are now rare in the Torrey Pines and Los Peñasquitos Lagoon area, likely as a result of habitat fragmentation, mountain lion tracks and scat were reported between Interstate 5's bridge and Los Peñasquitos Lagoon in 2000 by the Conservation Biology Institute in Encinitas. Mountain lions are relatively common in Los Peñasquitos Canyon Preserve , which is only a few miles away and connected to Los Peñasquitos Lagoon by Los Peñasquitos Creek. Mountain lion attacks have occurred on dogs and humans in San Diego County, and have sometimes resulted in human fatalities.

== Trails ==
Although public access is forbidden in the central parts of the lagoon and marsh, there are about four trails that are near the marsh area that do not explicitly bar public use.

=== Marsh Trail ===
The official name of this trail is simply Marsh Trail. It is unpaved on its west end and paved on its east end. It is shown on Google maps. Dogs and bicycles are prohibited. It skirts the southern edge of the wetland for 1.5 miles from North Torrey Pines Road and becomes Flintkote Avenue in Sorrento Valley, San Diego. The trailhead is across from the South Beach parking lot at Torrey Pines State Beach.

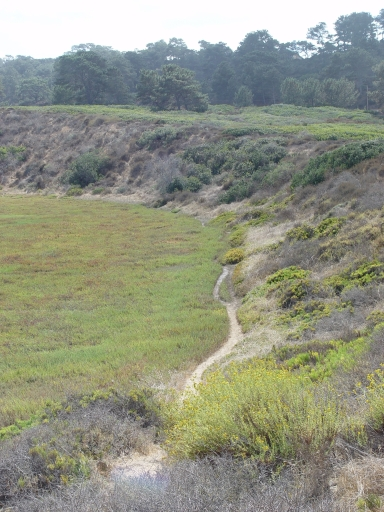
Marsh Trail

=== Closed section of Sorrento Valley Road ===
Paved. Motor vehicles are prohibited, but bicycles and pedestrians are permitted. Bicycles are very common. It skirts the eastern edge of the wetland from near the Park & Ride parking lot to near Pump Station 65. Both ends outside of the closed section are regularly used by motor vehicles.

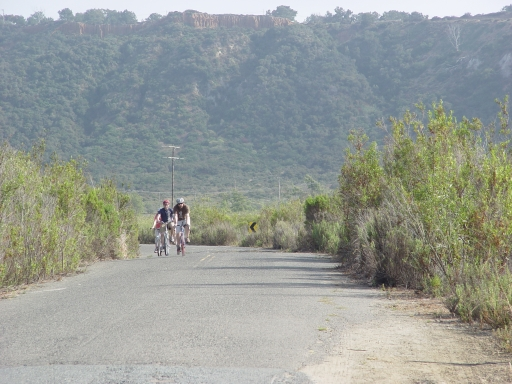
bicyclists on closed section of Sorrento Valley Road

=== Del Mar trail ===
Unpaved. Dogs are prohibited. Both trailheads are on Carmel Valley Road, one at the corner of McGonigle Road, and the other immediately west of Del Mar Car Service. The trail is relatively short, in a fairly dry area, and roughly follows the railroad causeway.

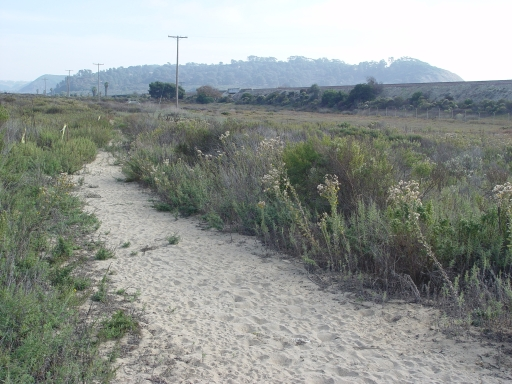
unnamed Del Mar trail

=== SR-56 Bike Route ===
Paved. It is shown on Google maps as "56 Bike Trail". This lies on the east side of Interstate 5. It follows Carmel Creek and California State Route 56. Bicycles, horses, and pedestrians are permitted, but not motor vehicles. Bicycles are very common.

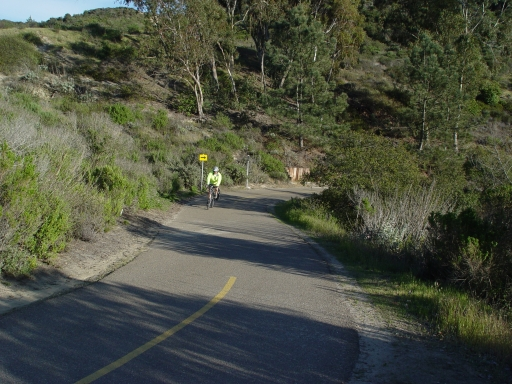
bicyclist on SR-56 Bike Route

== See also ==
- Del Mar, California
- Soledad Valley
- Sorrento Valley, San Diego
- Torrey Pines State Natural Reserve
- Torrey Pines State Beach

== External sources ==
- "Torrey Pines State Natural Reserve: Los Peñasquitos Lagoon".
- Los Peñasquitos Lagoon & Its Watershed - a Film by Jim Karnik.

32°55′48″N 117°15′11″W
