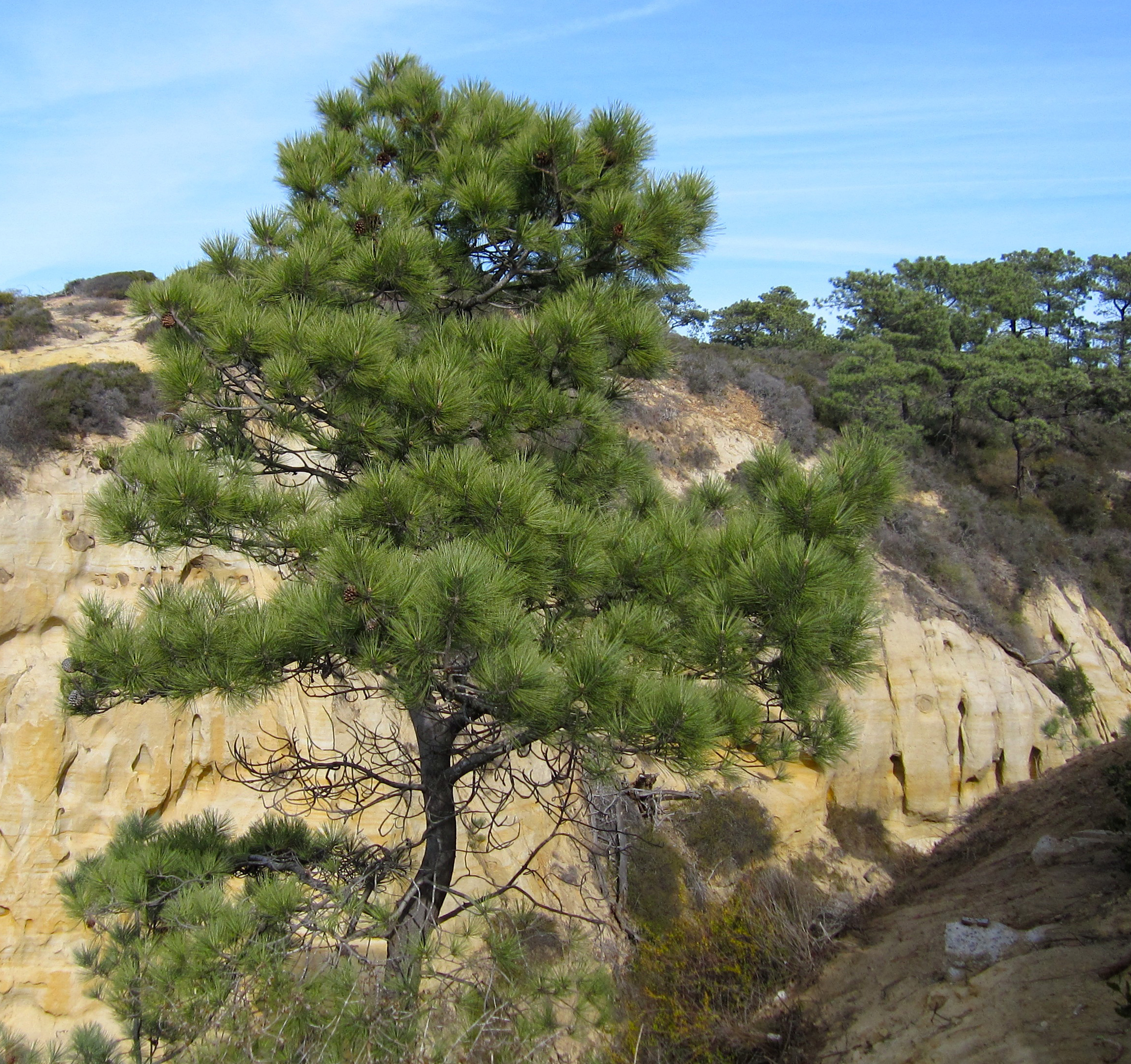
- A Torrey pine growing in Torrey Pines State Natural Reserve

Conservation status
- Critically Endangered (IUCN 3.1)

Scientific classification
- Kingdom: Plantae
- Clade: Embryophytes
- Clade: Tracheophytes
- Clade: Spermatophytes
- Clade: Gymnospermae
- Division: Pinophyta
- Class: Pinopsida
- Order: Pinales
- Family: Pinaceae
- Genus: Pinus
- Species: P. torreyana Parry ex Carrière
- Subspecies: P. t. subsp. torreyana

Trinomial name
- Pinus torreyana subsp. torreyana

= Pinus torreyana subsp. torreyana =

Subspecies of plant

Pinus torreyana subsp. torreyana is a subspecies of the critically endangered Torrey pine in the family Pinaceae. It is native to California, and grows only in the coastal region of San Diego County, California.

== Status ==
It is listed as critically endangered by the IUCN.
