= Torrey Pines State Beach =

State park in California, United States

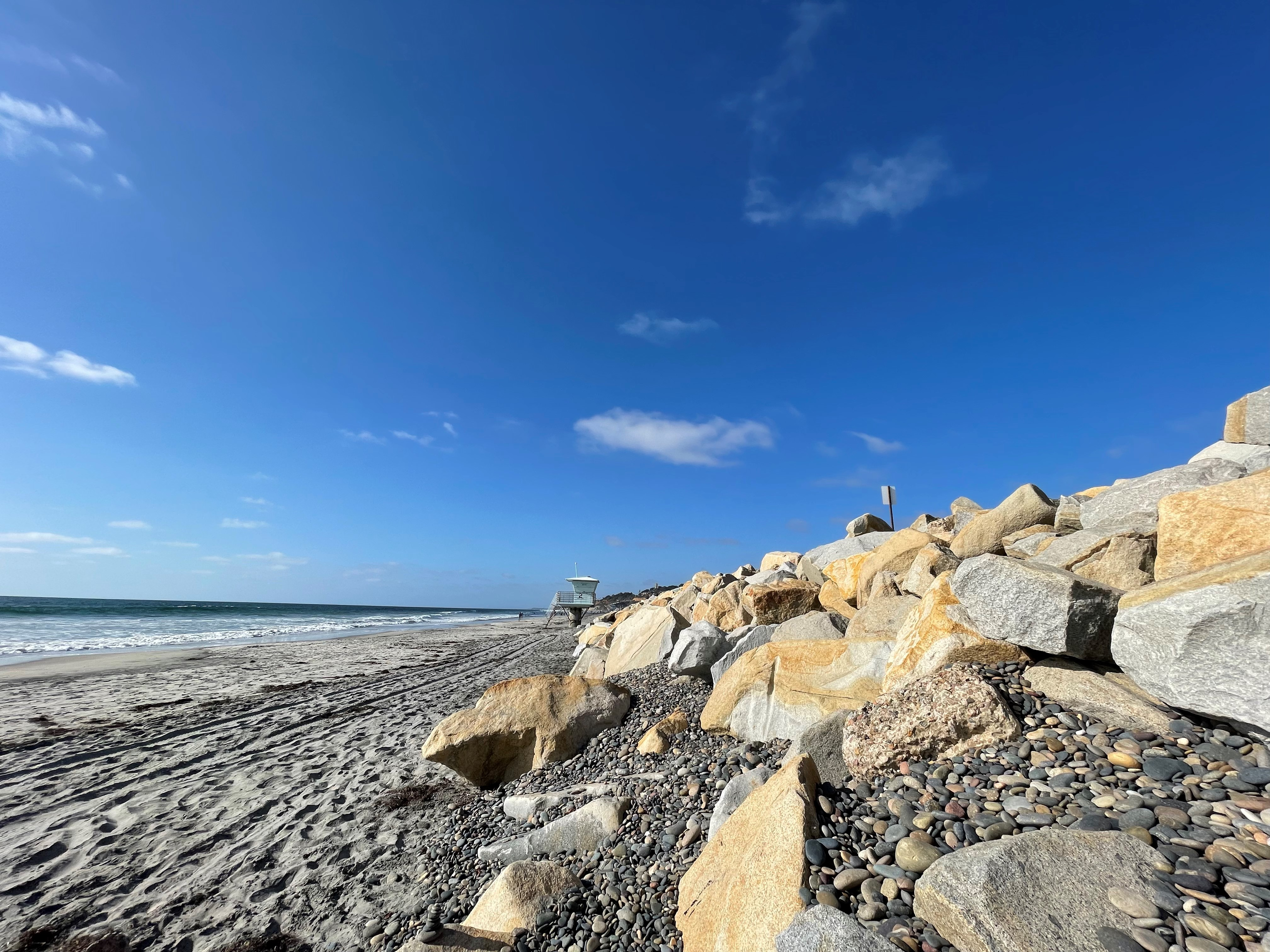

- Location within California Location within the United States
- Location: San Diego, California
- Nearest city: San Diego
- Coordinates: 32°55′53″N 117°15′37″W
- Established: 1957
- Governing body: California Department of Parks and Recreation

Torrey Pines State Beach is a public beach in San Diego, California, located in a community of Torrey Pines, south of Del Mar and north of La Jolla. Coastal erosion from the adjacent Torrey Pines State Natural Reserve makes for a picturesque landscape.

The beach is at the base of a series of 300-foot sandstone cliffs of white and golden stone, with a greenish layer sometimes visible at the very bottom. At the north end of the beach the cliffs end and Los Peñasquitos Lagoon, a salt marsh estuary, empties into the ocean. County Route S21 crosses the entrance, with limited free parking along the beach.

== Ecology ==
The beach area supports a number of avifaunal (bird) species in addition to the marine biota. Soledad Valley, which includes the notable coastal marsh, Los Peñasquitos Lagoon, is cut by a coastal stream which discharges into the Pacific Ocean at Torrey Pines State Beach. The endangered nominal subspecies of Torrey pine, Pinus torreyana torreyana, is found only on the small coastal strips north and south of Torrey Pines State Beach.

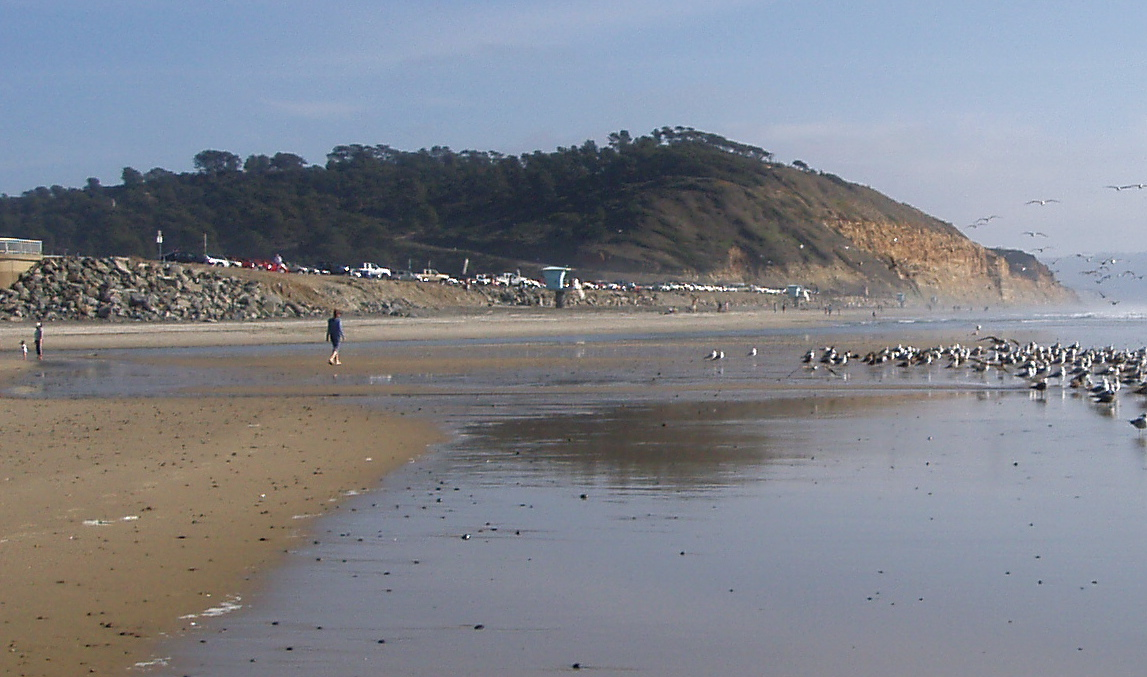
View of beach with Torrey Pines State Park in the background

360° panorama of beach and cliffs

== Surf ==
Waves ranging from the low 3-footers to the high 6–8 footers can be found on the north side of Torrey Pines State Beach. The northern side of the beach has a surfer/surfing side while the southern side hosts swimming, bodyboarding, etc. There is a red/yellow flag on the north part of the beach showing the boundary between the surfing side and body boarding side. A good rule of thumb is to occasionally check where the flag is as it moves from time to time during the day.

The beach is usually not very crowded in the early hours of the day, when primarily surfers and body boarders are present. During that time, the boundary of the surfing and body boarding areas is not as strictly enforced, as long as common courtesy is being used on both sides. The most popular part of the beach is the swimming area.

== See also ==
- List of beaches in San Diego County
- List of California state parks
  - List of California State Beaches

To the North: Del Mar City Beach	California beaches	To the South; Black's Beach
