= Margaret Fleming =

Margaret Fleming may refer to:

- Margaret Fleming, Countess of Atholl (1536–1586), Scottish courtier, lady-in-waiting to Mary, Queen of Scots, alleged witch and granddaughter of James IV
- Margaret Fleming (1888–1977), co-owner of the Guy and Margaret Fleming House, California
- Margaret Fleming (1980–c. 1999), Scottish victim in the Murder of Margaret Fleming
- Margaret Fleming (play), an 1890 play by James A. Herne

== See also ==
- Marjorie Fleming (1803–1811), Scottish child writer and poet
- Peggy Fleming (born 1948), American figure skater
