= Los Peñasquitos Canyon Preserve =

Park in San Diego, California, United States

Coordinates: 32°56′0″N 117°10′2″W

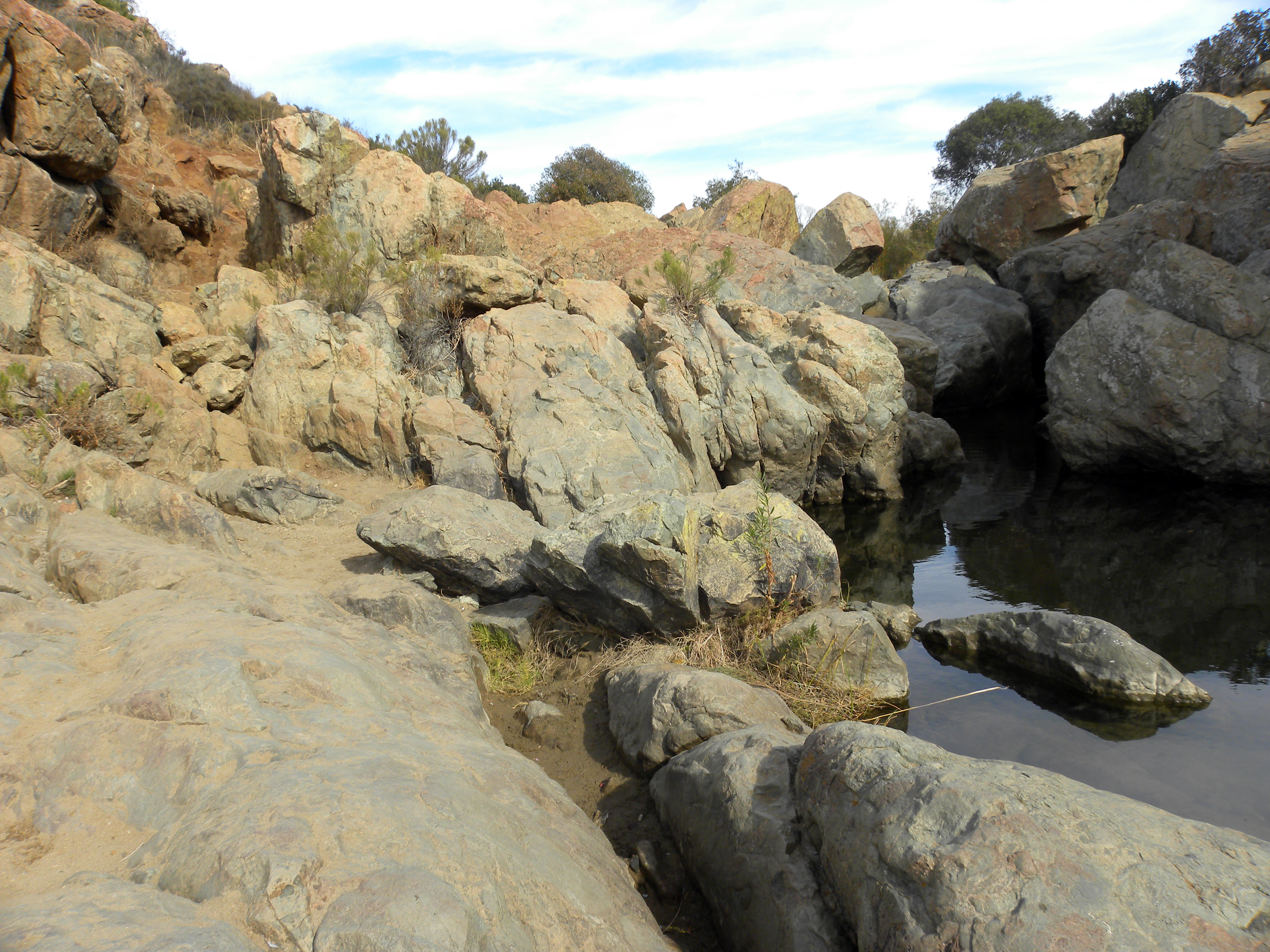
Waterfalls in Los Peñasquitos Canyon Preserve.

Los Peñasquitos Canyon Preserve is an urban park in San Diego, California. Stretching approximately 7 miles (11 km), the park encompasses some 4,000 acres (16 km^{2}) of both Peñasquitos and Lopez canyons and is within the top 50 largest urban parks in the United States. The preserve is jointly owned and administered by the City of San Diego and the County of San Diego.

Los Peñasquitos is also home to the historic Rancho Santa Maria de Los Peñasquitos, an adobe home built in the early 1820s. Operated by the County of San Diego, the home has been restored, and tours are available for the public.

== Natural history ==
More than 500 plant species, more than 175 types of birds, and a great variety of reptiles, amphibians and mammals make up the rich biodiversity of the park. Many of these species are rare or endangered. Mammals commonly spotted in the preserve include mule deer, bobcats, coyotes, and rabbits. A rare mountain lion attack occurred in May 2019.

The geology of the Preserve area has been described in a geology book by John Northrup in conjunction with the University of California & published by Windsor Associates. Nearby is Torrey Pines State Natural Reserve, where one of only two extant stands of the endangered Torrey Pine is found.
