= Guy Fleming =

American naturalist (1884–1960)

Guy L. Fleming
- Born: May 27, 1884; Nebraska, United States
- Died: May 15, 1960 (aged 75); San Diego, California, United States
- Known for: Conservation of Pinus torreyana (Torrey pine)
- Scientific career
- Fields: Botany
- Workplaces: California State Parks System, San Diego Natural History Museum

Guy L. Fleming (May 27, 1884 – May 15, 1960) was an American naturalist whose conservation work led to the founding of Torrey Pines State Natural Reserve, now a 2000-acre protected coastal area of La Jolla, San Diego. The Torrey pine, Pinus torreyana, is the rarest pine species in the United States.

As district superintendent of state parks for southern California, Fleming also worked to protect major nature preserves that extend from the U.S. border with Mexico to northern San Diego county; these include the natural areas that became Anza-Borrego Desert State Park, Cuyamaca Rancho State Park and Palomar Mountain State Park. As a fellow of the San Diego Society of Natural History, he worked closely with scientists and staff of the San Diego Natural History Museum, leading public nature walks for the museum and lecturing on environmental issues.

== Biography ==
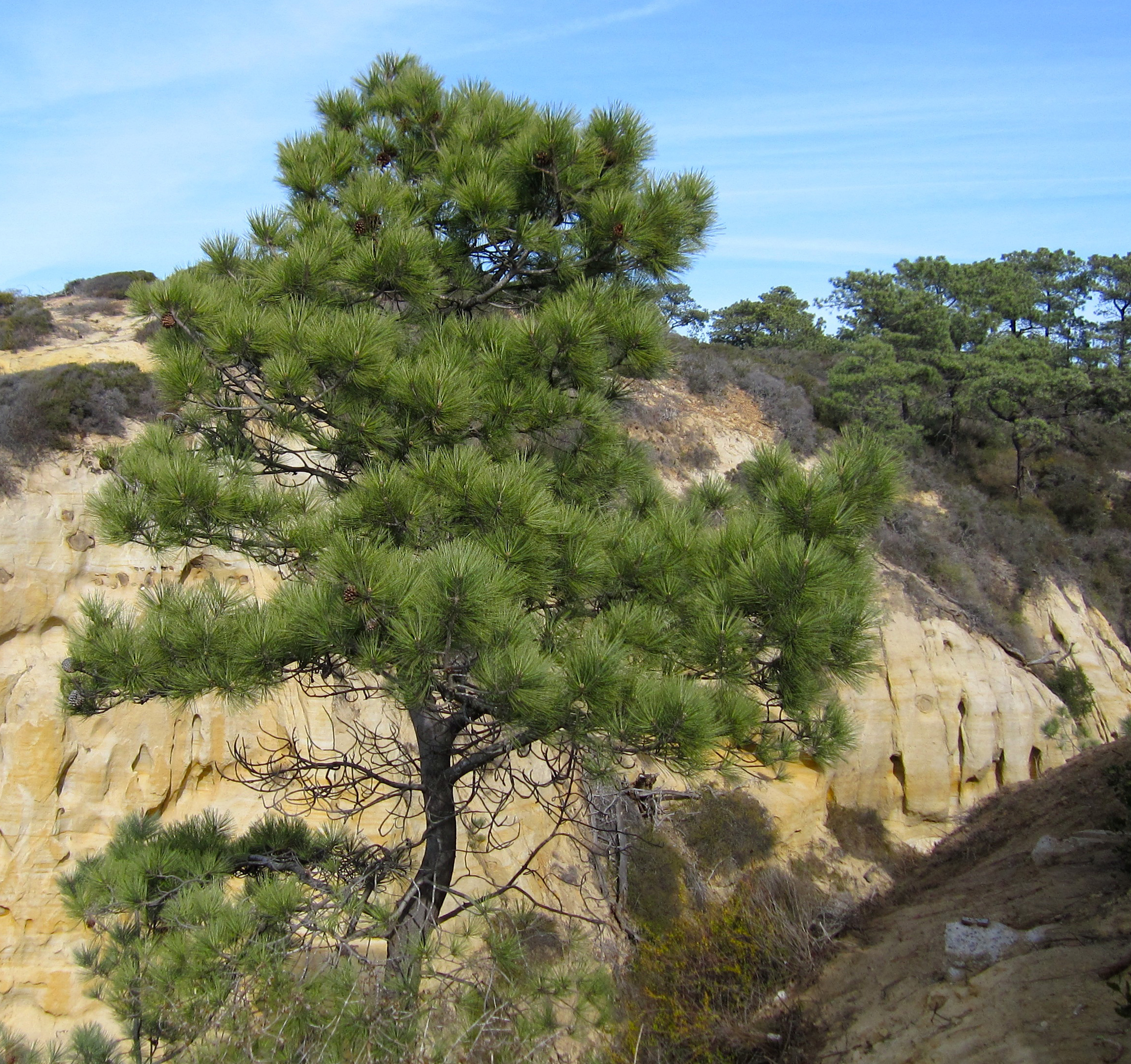
Pinus torreyana at State Reserve (photo: Richard O. Barry)

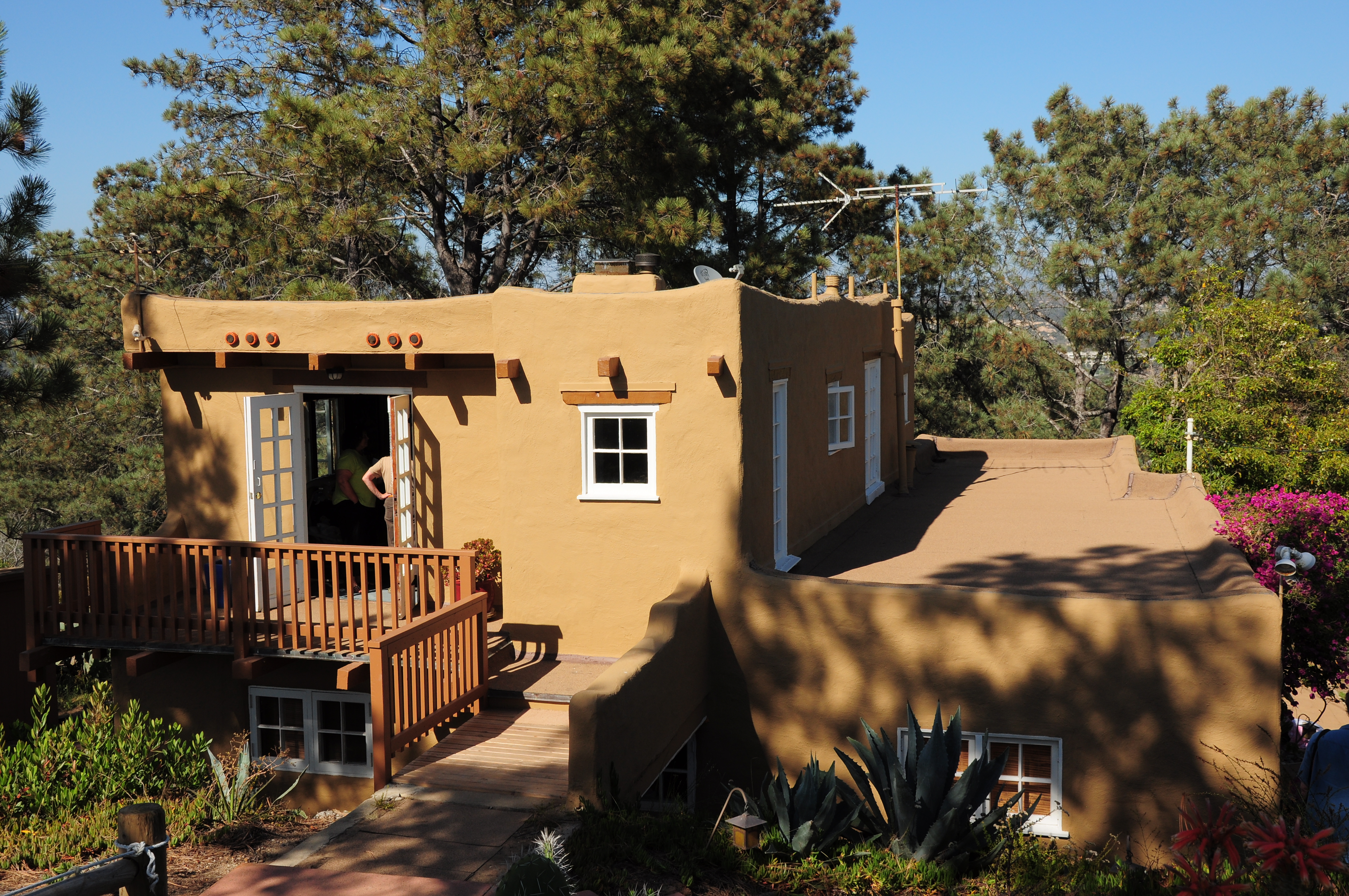
Guy and Margaret Fleming House, built in 1927. Torrey Pines State Natural Reserve, San Diego, CA

Born in Nebraska on May 27, 1884, to Georgia Lowd and James Fleming (a carpenter), Guy L. Fleming was twelve when his family moved to Corvallis, Oregon. In 1909, he moved to San Diego and found work as a gardener for the Little Lander Colony of San Ysidro, laying out and planting the village park. His work caught the attention of former San Diego County Horticultural Commissioner and chairman of the advisory board for the Little Landers, George P. Hall, who encouraged Fleming to study botany. In 1911 he worked in the nursery preparing for the 1915 Panama–California Exposition; during the fair, he became a guide, giving talks on plants and landscaping.

In 1921, Fleming was hired by Ellen Browning Scripps as the custodian and naturalist of her property of Torrey Pines; in that year, the city of San Diego also hired him to be caretaker of the city-owned portion of Torrey Pines property adjacent to the Scripps land. Working with landscape architect Ralph D. Cornell, Fleming developed plans to preserve the Torrey pines on both the city and Scripps properties, proposing a nature park for the area. In 1922, they studied the only other stand of Torrey pines on Santa Rosa Island.

In 1923, Fleming became a fellow of the San Diego Society of Natural History, working throughout the 1920s to educate the public on conservation issues, leading nature walks and lecturing on the region's botanical diversity. He participated in study of pines in Baja California and of the proposed Kings Canyon National Park region and conducted a timber survey of Cuyamaca.

In 1927, Fleming married artist Margaret Doubleday Eddy; together they built a small home on the Scripps property at Torrey Pines. Their home, the Guy and Margaret Fleming House, also known as Torrey Pines Reserve Ranger Residence, was added to the National Register of Historic Places in June 1998. In 1932, Fleming was appointed District Superintendent for all southern California state parks (then 20 parks); during the Depression, he had responsibility for the administration of six CCC camps.

Fleming retired from the California State Parks System in 1948, but continued to be active in conservation efforts. In 1950, he was a founding member of the Torrey Pines Association, working to integrate the Torrey Pines City Park into the California State Park System.

Fleming died on 15 May 1960.
