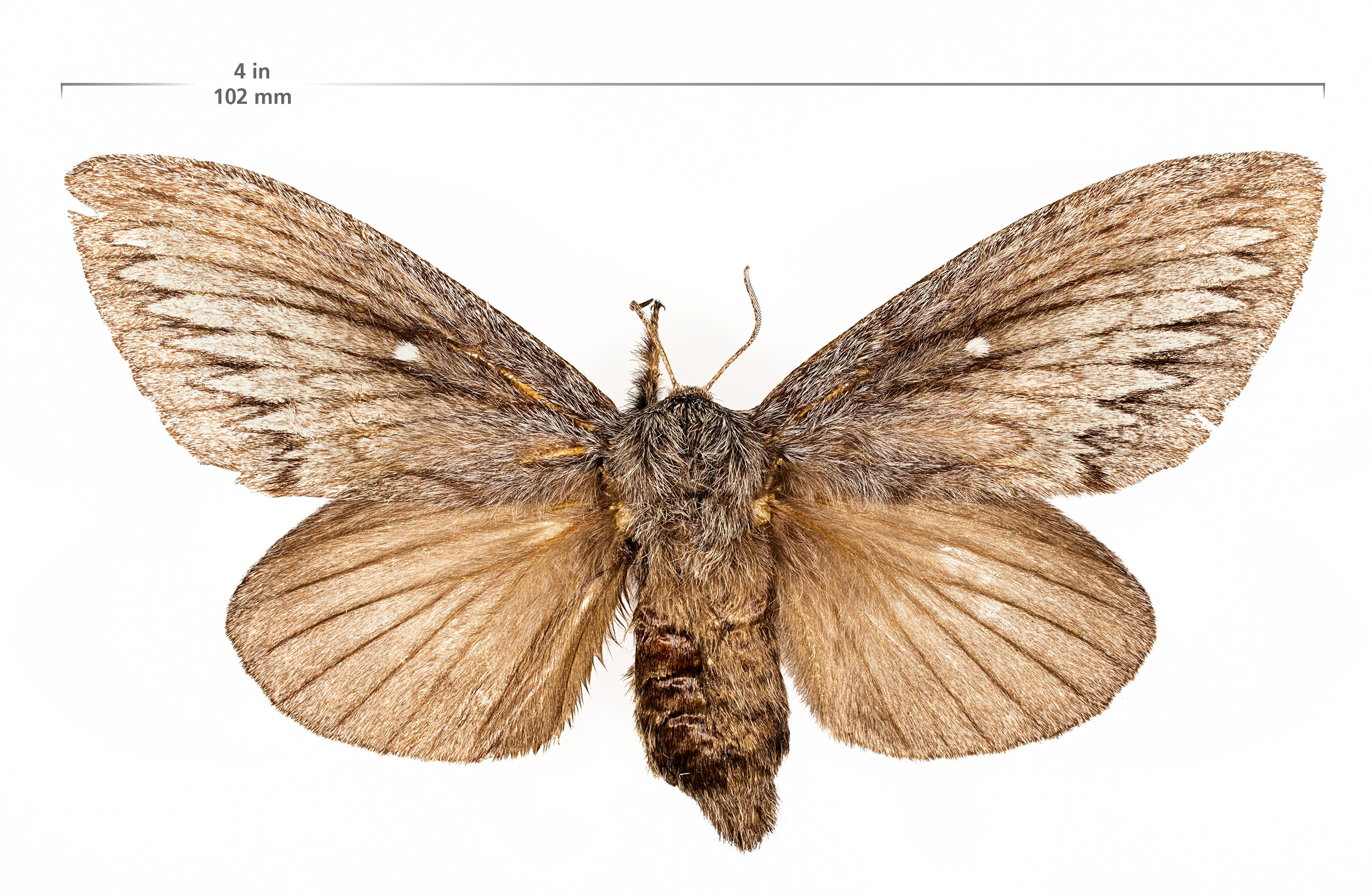
- Gloveria arizonensis

Scientific classification
- Kingdom: Animalia
- Phylum: Arthropoda
- Clade: Pancrustacea
- Class: Insecta
- Order: Lepidoptera
- Family: Lasiocampidae
- Subfamily: Lasiocampinae
- Genus: Gloveria; Packard, 1872

= Gloveria =

Genus of moths

Gloveria is a genus of moths in the family Lasiocampidae. The genus was erected by Packard in 1872. All the species in the genus are from southern North America.

== Species ==
- Gloveria arizonensis Packard, 1872 California - Texas, Colorado, Utah
- Gloveria concinna Dyar, 1918 Mexico
- Gloveria gargamelle (Strecker, 1885) Arizona, Texas
- Gloveria howardi (Dyar, 1896) Arizona
- Gloveria latipennis Dyar, 1918 Mexico
- Gloveria medusa (Strecker, 1898) California
- Gloveria obsoleta Dyar, 1918 Mexico
- Gloveria olivacea H. Edwards, 1884 Mexico
- Gloveria sodom Dyar, 1918 Mexico
- Gloveria sphingiformis Barnes & McDunnough, 1910 Texas
