= Gloveria concinna =

Scientific classification
- Domain: Eukaryota
- Kingdom: Animalia
- Phylum: Arthropoda
- Class: Insecta
- Order: Lepidoptera
- Family: Lasiocampidae
- Genus: Gloveria
- Species: G. concinna

Binomial name
- Gloveria concinna Dyar, 1919

Species of moth

Gloveria concinna is a species of moth in the family Lasiocampidae.
