= Guy and Margaret Fleming House =

- U.S. National Register of Historic Places
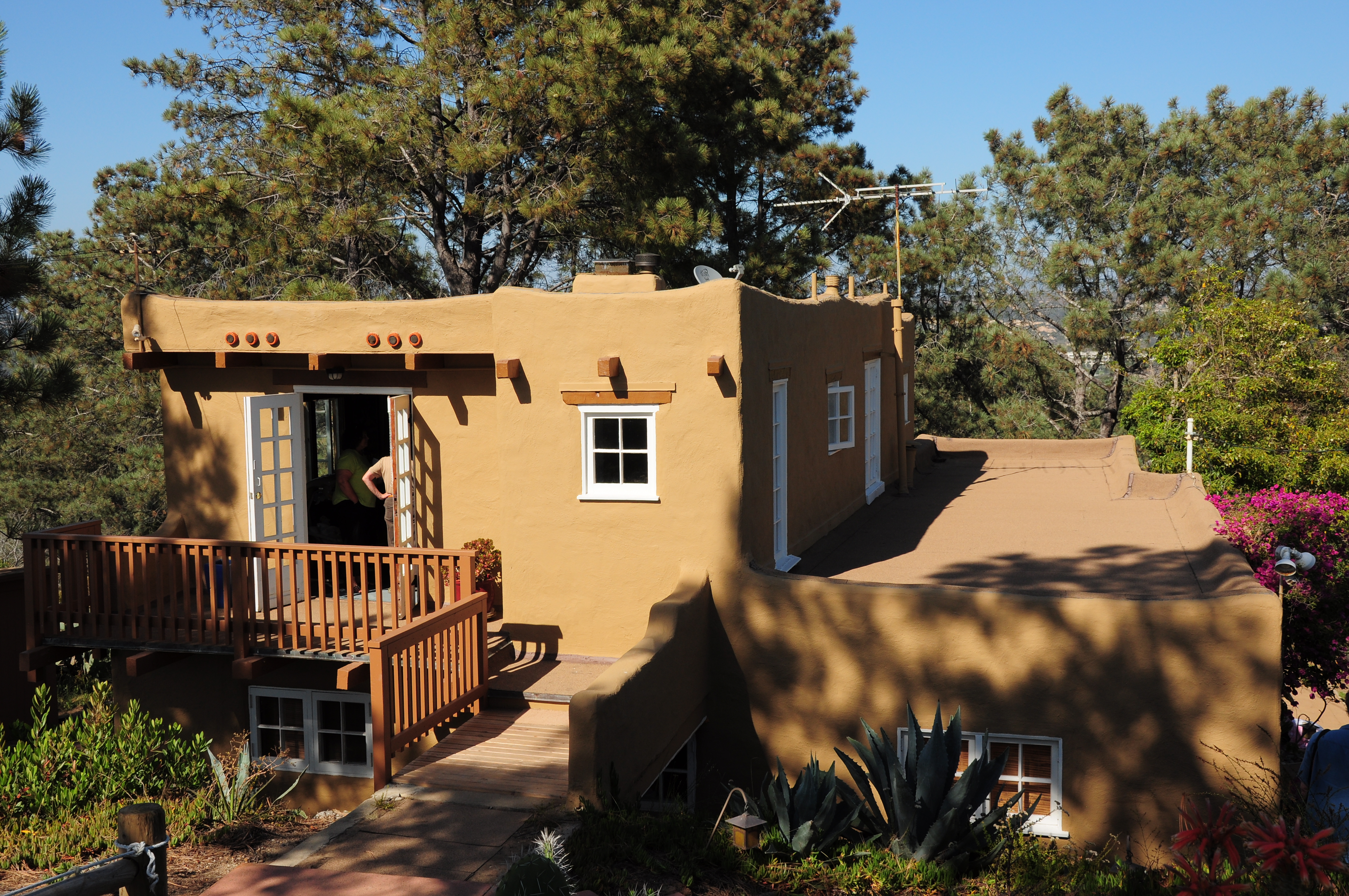

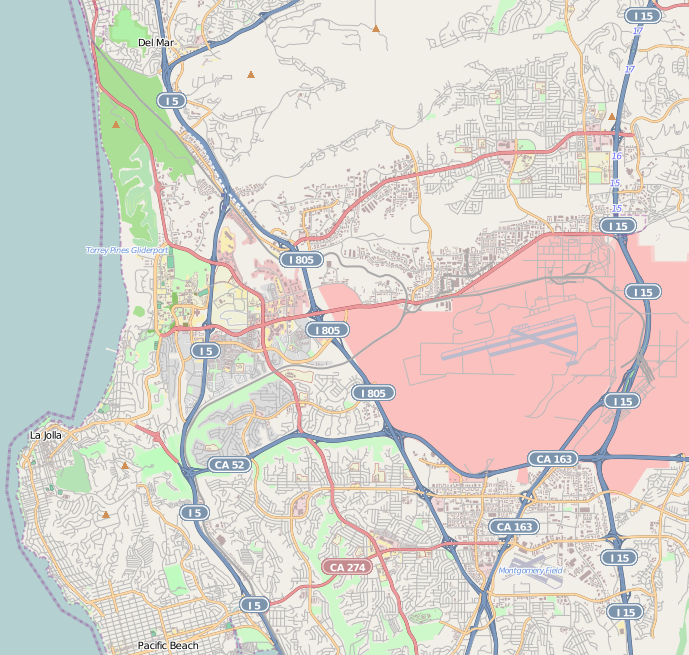
- Location within Northwestern San Diego Location within San Diego County, California Location within California Location within the United States
- Location: 12279 Torrey Pines Park Road, San Diego, California
- Coordinates: 32°55′20″N 117°15′19″W
- Built: 1927
- Architectural style: Pueblo Revival
- NRHP reference No.: 98000700
- Added to NRHP: June 18, 1998

The Guy and Margaret Fleming House, also known as Torrey Pines Reserve Ranger Residence, is a historic house in Torrey Pines State Natural Reserve. It was added to the National Register of Historic Places in June 1998.

Guy Fleming was a naturalist and the park custodian of Torrey Pines Reserve. He served as a guide during the Panama–California Exposition of 1915-16 and was noted for his conservation efforts throughout California, in particular his work founding the Anza Desert, Cuyamaca, and Palomar State Parks.

Margaret Eddy Fleming (1888–1977) was a landscape artist and naturalist. The Margaret Fleming Nature Trail in the Torrey Pines Reserve Extension Area was named in her honor.

The two-story wood-framed home was built in 1927 by Fleming and his father in the Pueblo Revival style.
