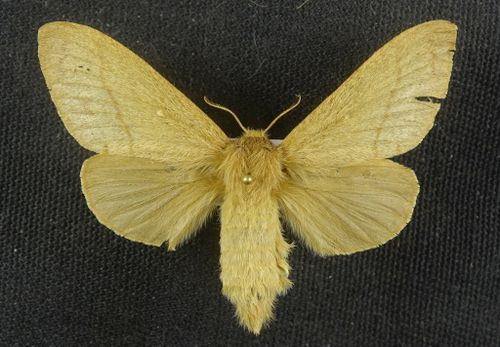

Scientific classification
- Kingdom: Animalia
- Phylum: Arthropoda
- Class: Insecta
- Order: Lepidoptera
- Family: Lasiocampidae
- Genus: Gloveria
- Species: G. howardi

Binomial name
- Gloveria howardi (Dyar, 1896)

= Gloveria howardi =

Species of moth

Gloveria howardi is a moth in the family Lasiocampidae.
