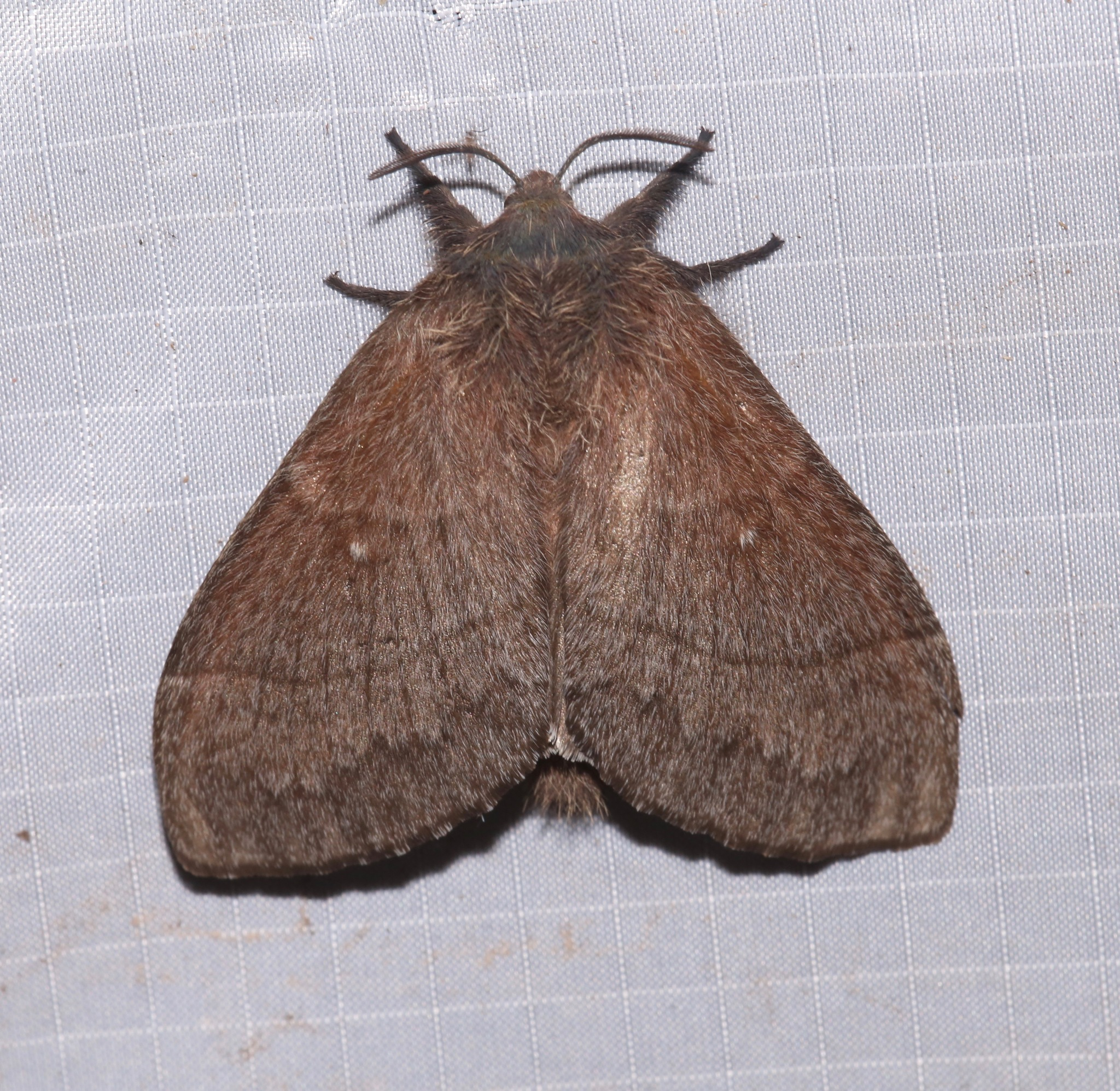

Scientific classification
- Domain: Eukaryota
- Kingdom: Animalia
- Phylum: Arthropoda
- Class: Insecta
- Order: Lepidoptera
- Family: Lasiocampidae
- Genus: Gloveria
- Species: G. gargamelle

Binomial name
- Gloveria gargamelle (Strecker, 1885)

= Gloveria gargamelle =

Species of moth

Gloveria gargamelle is a species of lasiocampid moth.
