= Salt pruning =

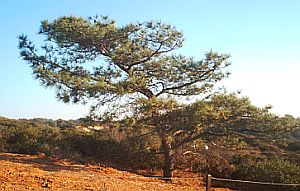
A Torrey pine shaped by salt pruning.

Salt pruning is the process by which saline mists generated by seawater are driven ashore by winds and thus over time alter the shape of trees or shrubs. The process degrades foliage and branches on the windward side of the plant that faces the body of saline water, more than it does the foliage on the landward side. The resultant growth form is asymmetrical, appearing "swept back" away from the ocean.

== Examples ==
There are numerous examples worldwide of this phenomenon, though it usually appears on coasts near saline water. In the eastern United States on Long Island, occurrences of salt-pruned Quercus stellata are observable in Flax Marsh. In San Diego County, California, a colony of Pinus torreyana has been salt-pruned by spray from the Pacific Ocean.

The logo of Torrey Pines Golf Course in La Jolla, California, features a salt-pruned Torrey pine.

In the case of Fire Island's Sunken Forest, the saline mists prevent new oak shoots from growing above the impacted area. These oaks grow "pruned" by the wind with bundles of bushes and stems at the top to keep it top-heavy. They also grow much shorter than regular oaks due to the salt keeping them below or around the height of the hill.

== History ==
The first known record of salt pruning was in 1805, though it was called a "storm of salt" by British botanist Richard Anthony Salisbury. Much later, Bertram Whittier Wells discovered a similar effect at Cape Fear, though he described the oak tree's bent form to be the "Salt Spray Climax."

Later research done in Cape Fear by Stephen G. Boyce between the years 1951-52 found the oaks were not experiencing necrosis due to the abrasion from the salt content and pressure, but instead had grown accustomed to it. The plant life in the Cape Cod area showed similar salt pruning. While the leaves did not experience necrosis, they did appear to curl in on themselves.

== See also ==
- Ice pruning
- Lone Cypress
