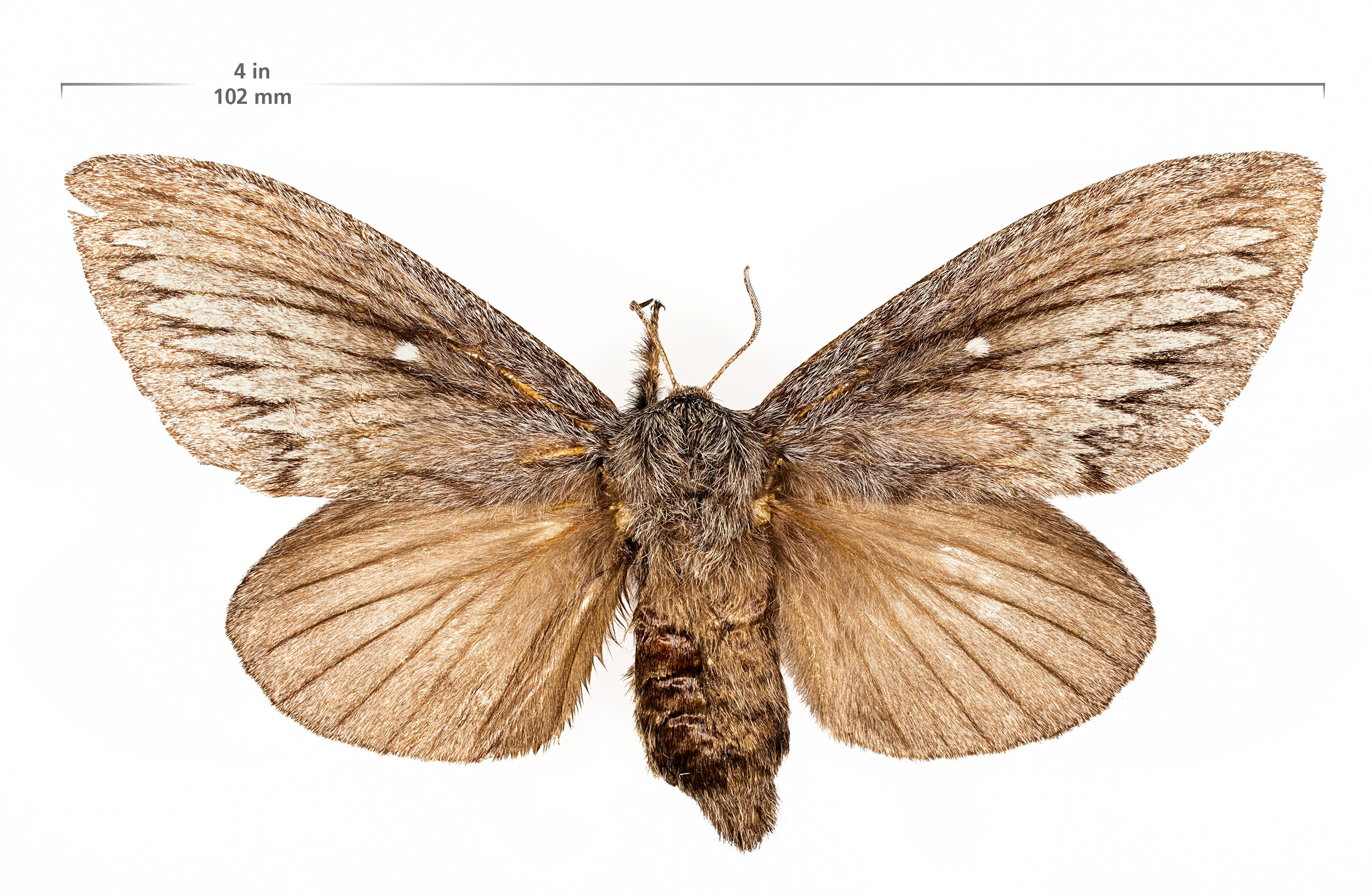

Scientific classification
- Kingdom: Animalia
- Phylum: Arthropoda
- Clade: Pancrustacea
- Class: Insecta
- Order: Lepidoptera
- Family: Lasiocampidae
- Genus: Gloveria
- Species: G. arizonensis

Binomial name
- Gloveria arizonensis Packard, 1872

Synonyms
- Gloveria dentata Edwards, 1884; Gloveria dolores Neumoegen & Dyar, 1893

= Gloveria arizonensis =

Species of moth

Gloveria arizonensis is a species of moth in the family Lasiocampidae. It is native to California, Texas, Colorado & Utah.
