= Soledad Valley =

Coastal valley in San Diego County, California, U.S.

Coordinates: 32.9336°N 117.2599°W

Soledad Valley is a coastal valley in San Diego County, California, at the northern end of the city of San Diego. Mention of the valley was made as early as 1850 in association with the occurrence of the Torrey pine tree at the mouth of the lagoon. The colony of the endangered Torrey pine divided by Soledad Valley is one of only two colonies of this tree in the world.

== See also ==
- Del Mar, California
