= Torrey Pines State Natural Reserve =

State park in California

- IUCN category V (protected landscape/seascape)
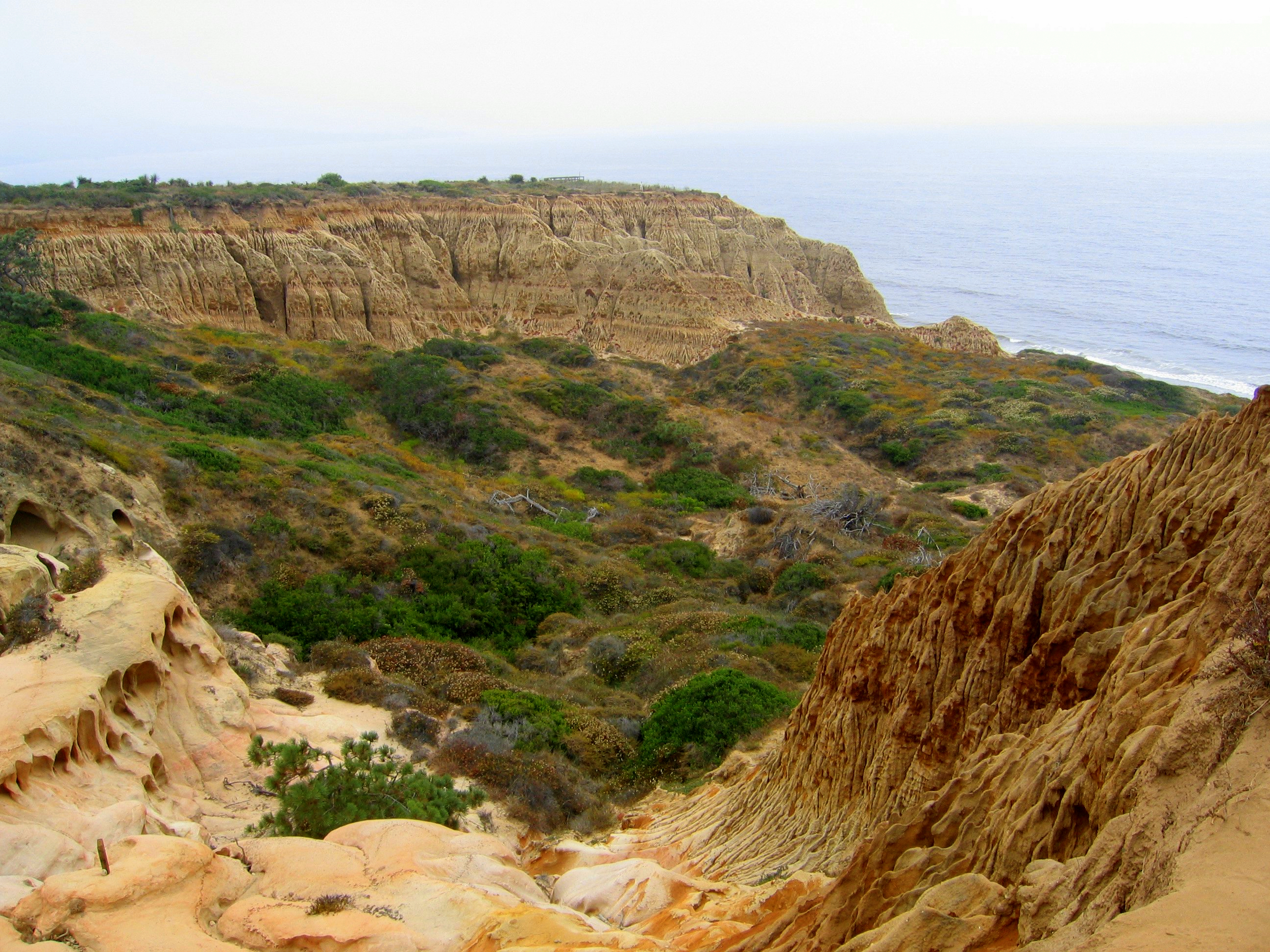
- Torrey Pines State Natural Reserve

- Location within California Location within the United States
- Interactive map of Torrey Pines State Natural Reserve
- Location: San Diego, California
- Coordinates: 32°55′16″N 117°15′12″W
- Area: 2,000 acres (8.1 km^{2})
- Website: www.torreypine.org

U.S. National Natural Landmark
- Designated: 1977

Torrey Pines State Natural Reserve is a coastal state park in San Diego, California. The reserve is one of the wildest stretches of land on the Southern California coast, covering 2,000 acres (810 ha). It is bordered immediately to the south by Torrey Pines Golf Course and to the north by the city of Del Mar. The reserve was designated a National Natural Landmark in 1977.

The reserve consists of a plateau with cliffs that overlook Torrey Pines State Beach and a lagoon that is vital to migrating seabirds. Many different kinds of wildlife and flora are found within the reserve, including bobcat, fox, skunk, raccoon, coyote, rabbit, cacti, coastal chaparral, and the rare Torrey pine. During whale migration, it is possible to see several species from the cliffs, including humpback whale and gray whale.

Overlooking the steep Torrey Sandstone cliffs of Torrey Pines State Natural Resever and Black's Beach below.

The 8 miles (13 km) of trails within the park offer an attraction for hikers and beach-goers. A small museum sits at the top of the hill. From the cliffs and many places along the beach, it is possible to see La Jolla to the south and Del Mar to the north. At the southern end of the beach is a large rock that projects into the ocean, called Flat Rock. South of the rock is San Diego's unofficial nude beach, Black's Beach.

== Establishment ==
The area is home to the Kumeyaay, Payómkawichum, Kuupiaxchem, and Cahuilla peoples. George Marston persuaded the San Diego City Council in 1899 to pass an ordinance preserving 364 acres (147 ha) of the pueblo land as a park. Later between 1908 and 1911, newspaperwoman and philanthropist Ellen Browning Scripps bought additional land and donated it to the city. In 1916, Guy Fleming visited the park and after examining the current condition, pushed for preservation of the park and eventually became the District Superintendent for the Southern California State Park System. The Torrey Pines Lodge was completed in 1923 and a year later, more lands were added to the park. Now consisting of over 1,000 acres (400 ha) of cliffs, beach, and more, the park became open to the public.

In 1956, it was decided that the park be handed over to the State of California for higher protection because it is a state reserve. In 1970, 197 acres (80 ha) and 1,500 trees were added due to fear of human expansion. Later in 1975, the Torrey Pines Docent Society was started to help promote preservation of the park, in addition to the Visitors Center. In 2007, the park's name was changed to Torrey Pines State Natural Reserve. The park size is now over 2,000 acres (810 ha). The official Torrey Pines website provides more detail on the establishment of the Torrey Pines Reserve.

== Ecology ==
=== Torrey Pine ===
The Pinus torreyana torreyana, also known as the Torrey pine, is the rarest pine in North America. The plant has vanished over time due to the drying period over the last 10 years and has an intricate root system that helps attach it to the overbearing bluffs. Torrey Pines is the sole location worldwide where this subspecies grows (including a small coastal strip immediately north of the Reserve in Del Mar). A closely related subspecies occurs on Santa Rosa Island.

=== Other species, climate ===
While chiefly known as habitat to this extremely rare and endangered species, the Torrey Pine Reserve also is home to a wide variety of vegetation and wildlife. The Torrey Pines Reserve has a rather unusual climate due to the Santa Ana winds causing the vegetation to be drier. Plant communities such as coastal sage scrub, coastal strand, and salt marsh also thrive at Torrey Pines. More information on the different plants that grow at this park is provided on the official Torrey Pines website.

== Trails ==
Torrey Pines State Natural Reserve offers 8 trails to hikers that vary in terms of length, difficulty, and scenery. San Diego Tourism Authority says that three popular trails at the park are Guy Fleming Trail, Razor Point Trail, and Beach Trail. The Guy Fleming Trail is 0.7 miles (1,100 m) and is the easiest trail at the park. The trail provides diverse scenery from Peñasquitos Marsh to views of La Jolla and is well known for whale sightings in the winter. The Razor Point Trail is a 1.4 miles (2,300 m) loop that provides hikers with a view of ravines and badlands while overlooking the ocean. The Beach Trail is a 3/4 mile (1,200 m) walk that leads one down to Torrey Pines State Beach. Although it is the least scenic trail, it is very popular due to taking hikers straight to the wide-open beach. Other trails at the park are the Parry Grove Trail, Yucca Point Trail, High Point Trail, Broken Hill Trail, and Discovery Trail. The official Torrey Pines website provides more information on the other trails.

Following phase one of the Torrey Pines State Natural Reserve renovation project in 2025, phase two began on September 20, 2026. The first phase of the project closed the main road and trails, upper parking lots, and visitor center. This year, the entire park will be closed as aging sewer systems and electrical lines will be replaced. New ADA-compliant restrooms will be built as well. Phase two is expected to conclude in March 2027, and the facilities will become accessible to the public once again.

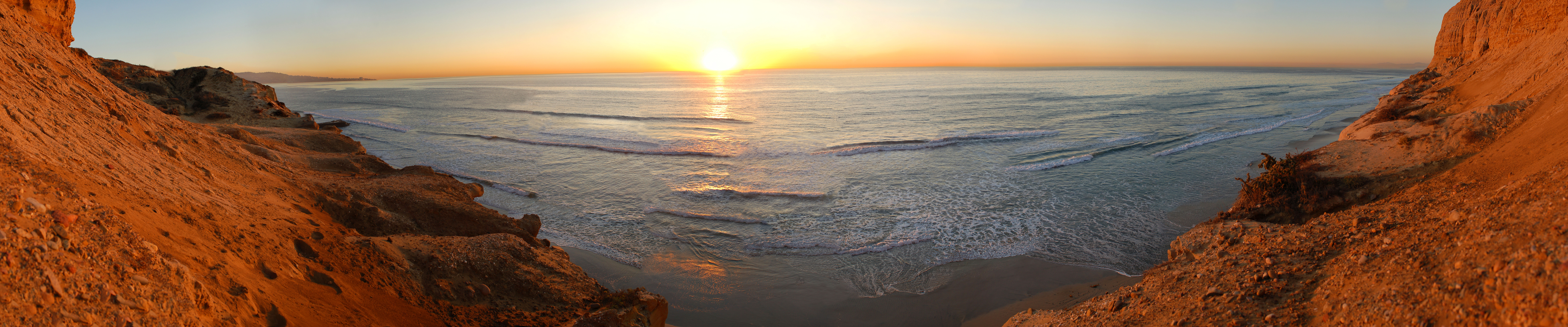
A November beach-sunset as viewed from a cliff-overlook at Torrey Pines State Natural Reserve, San Diego, California. 180° panorama.

== Accidents ==
In 2008, a 57-year-old tourist from Henderson, Nevada died from a cliff that gave way. The man was struck on the head by basketball-sized boulders, and after the victim was dug out of the debris, a crew performed cardiopulmonary resuscitation to try to save his life. The man died hours later. Torrey Pines is known for its sandy, unstable cliffs and this was not the first time a cliff had collapsed. On January 18, 2014, a 65-year-old hiker fell about 0.5 miles (800 m) down a trail at Torrey Pines and broke his ankle. The injury was so drastic that the man needed a cliff rescue.

== Gallery ==
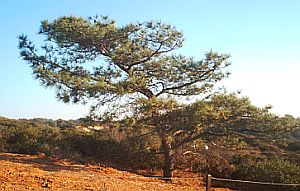
A Torrey pine exhibiting salt pruning in its windswept native habitat

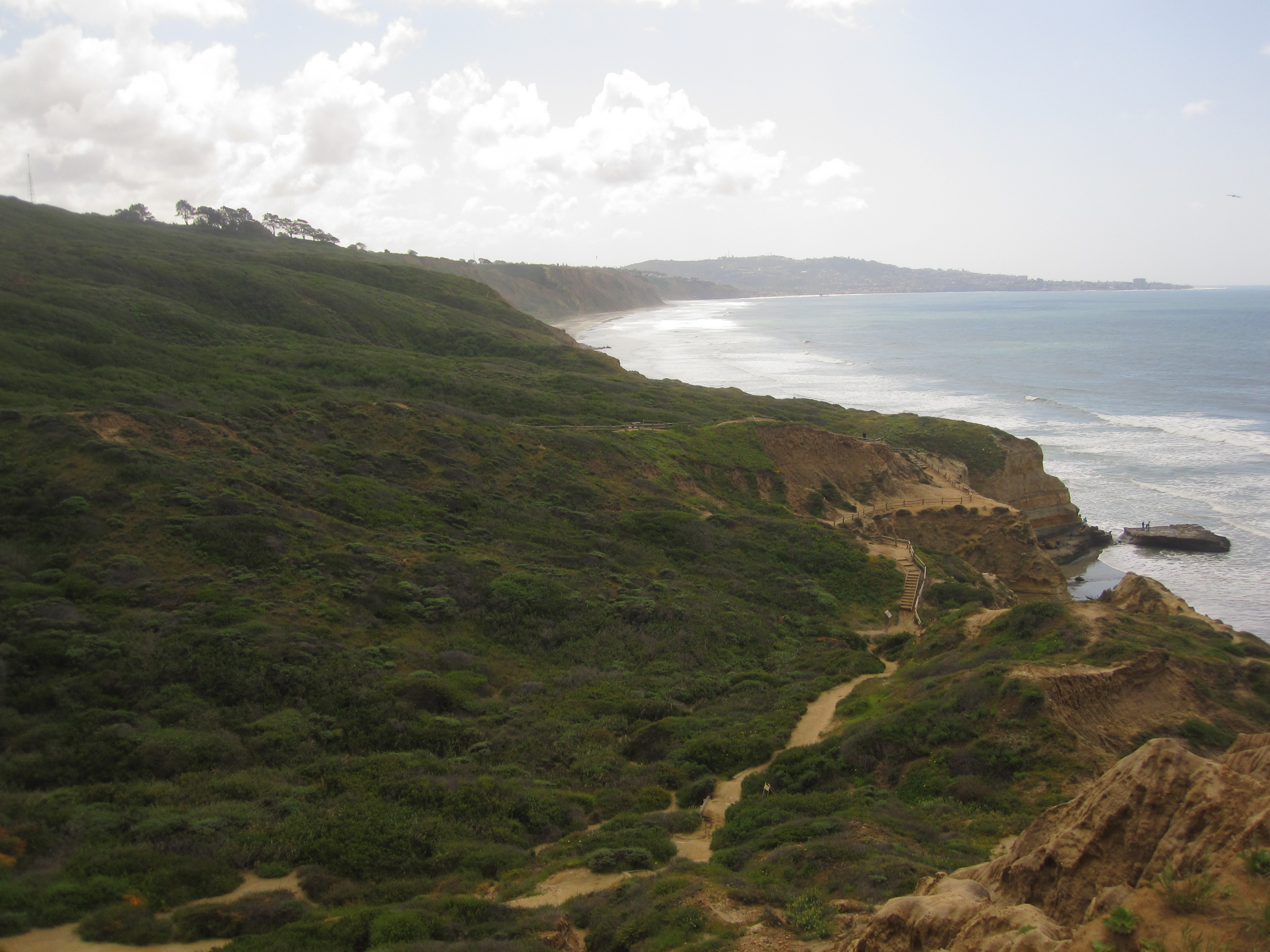
Torrey Pines State Natural Reserve

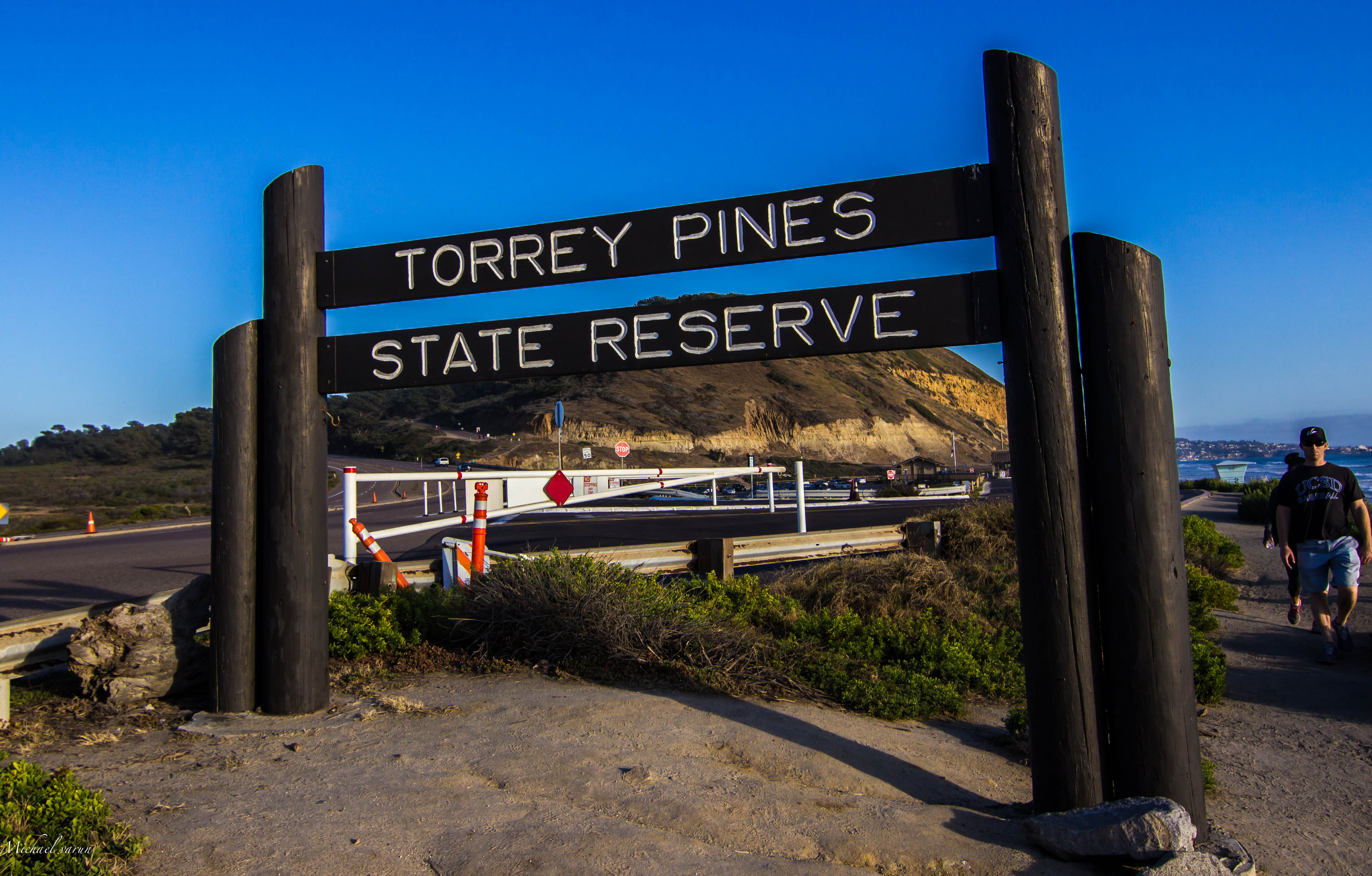
Torrey Pines Park

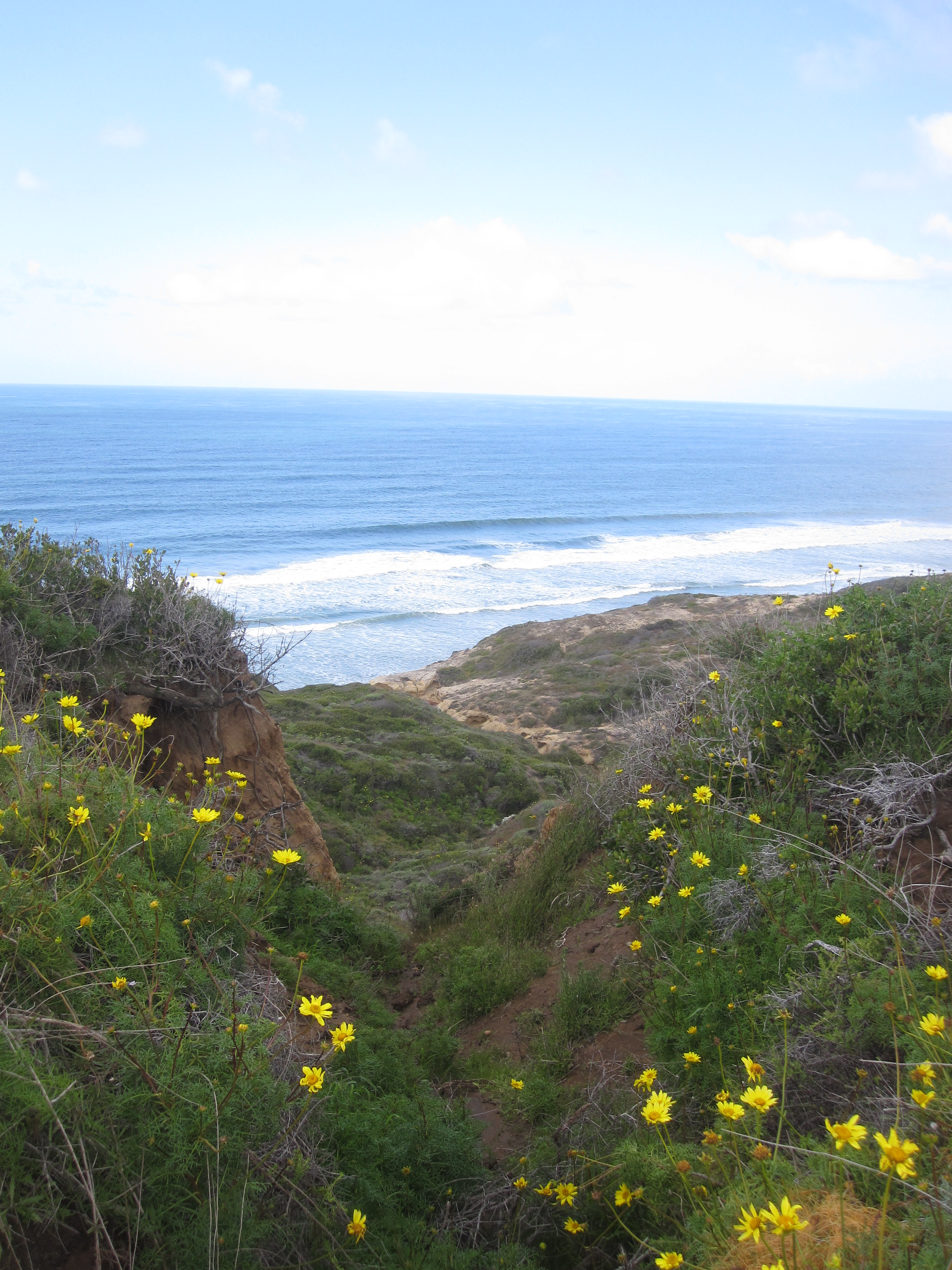
View on one of the trails at Torrey Pines State Natural Reserve

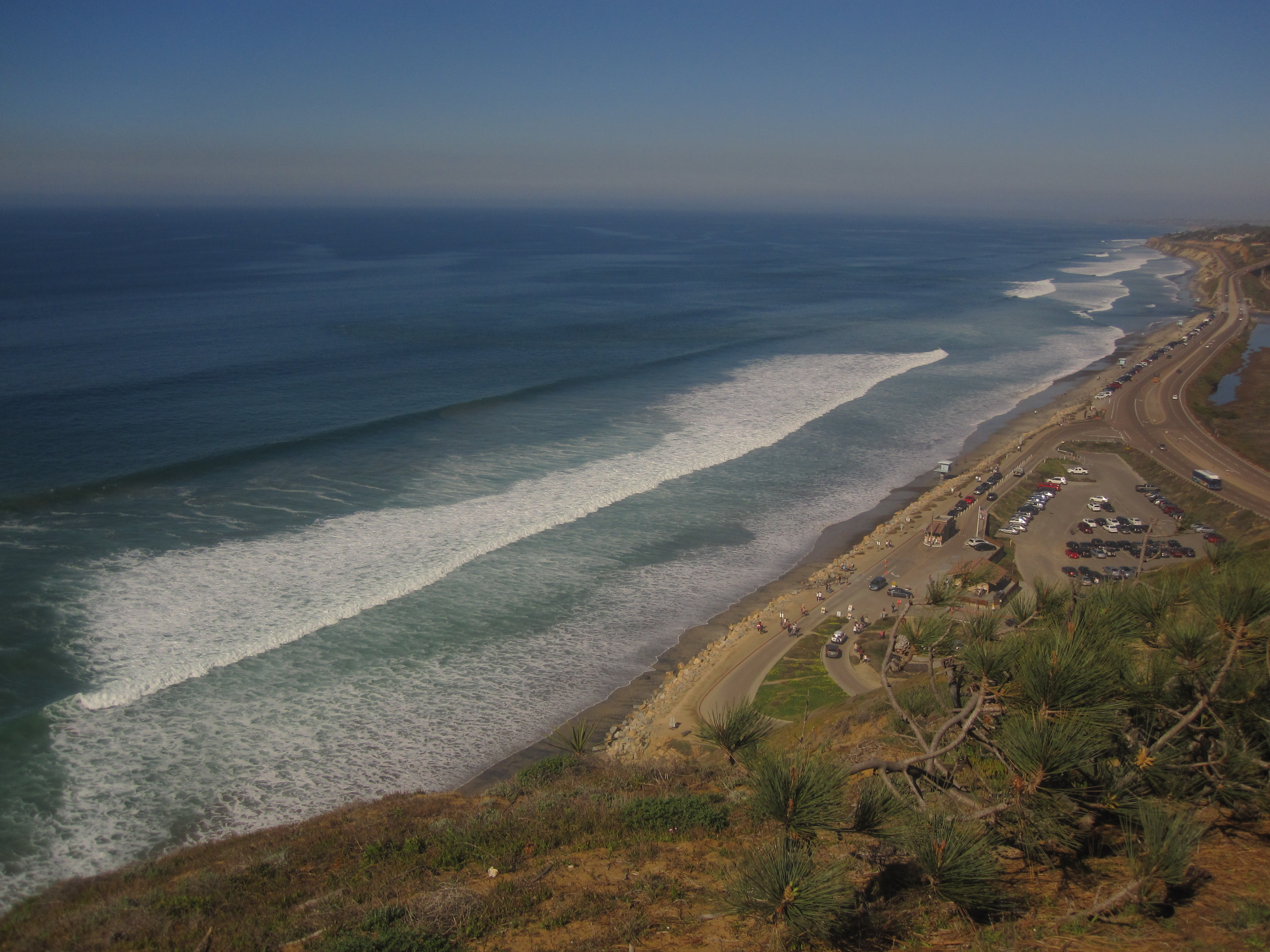
View of Torrey Pines Road from Torrey Pines State Natural Reserve

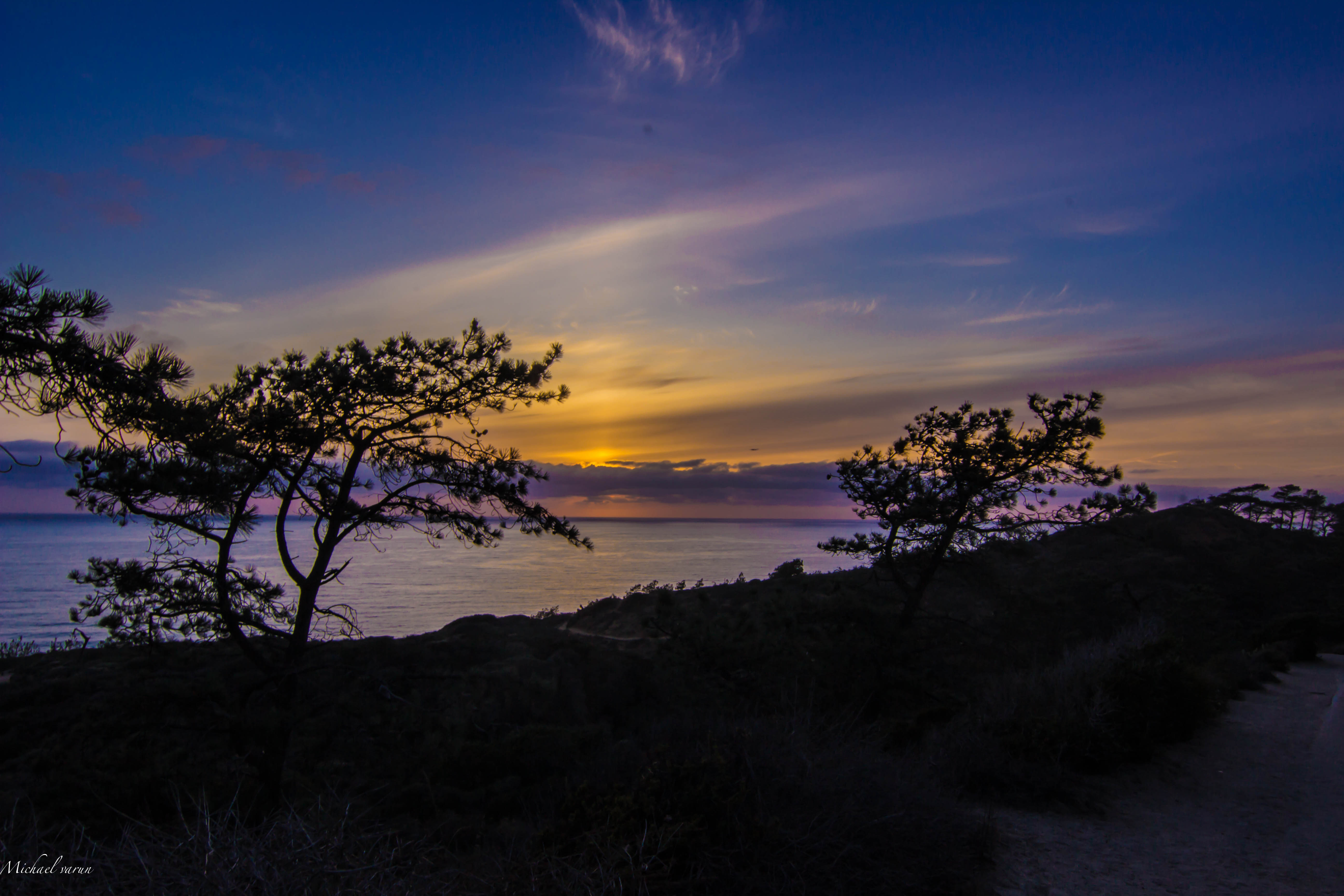
Sunset at Torrey Pines

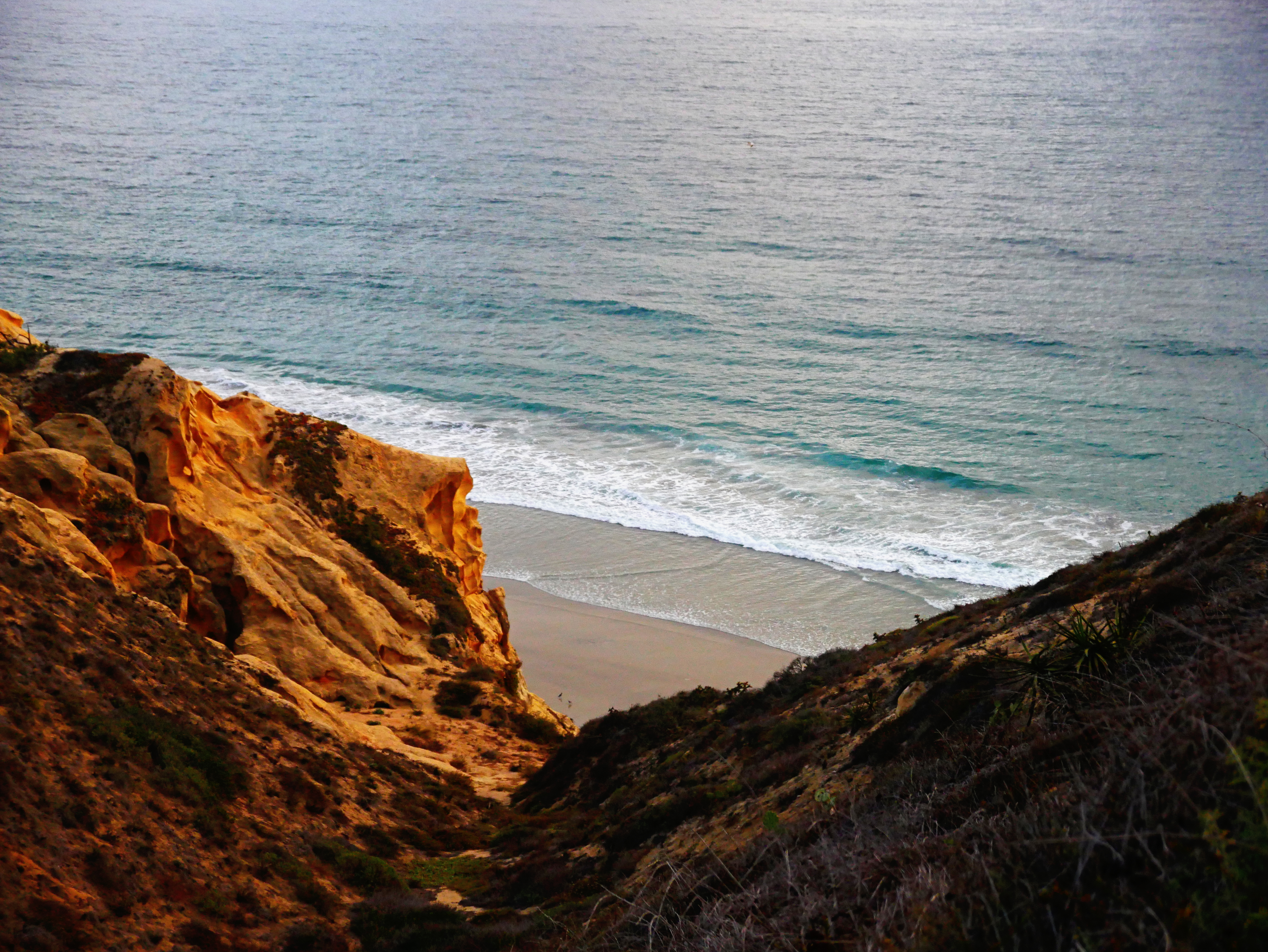
Beach at Torrey Pines

A trail overlooking the Pacific Ocean in Torrey Pines State Natural Reserve.

== See also ==
- Los Peñasquitos Lagoon
- San Diego Historical Landmarks in La Jolla
