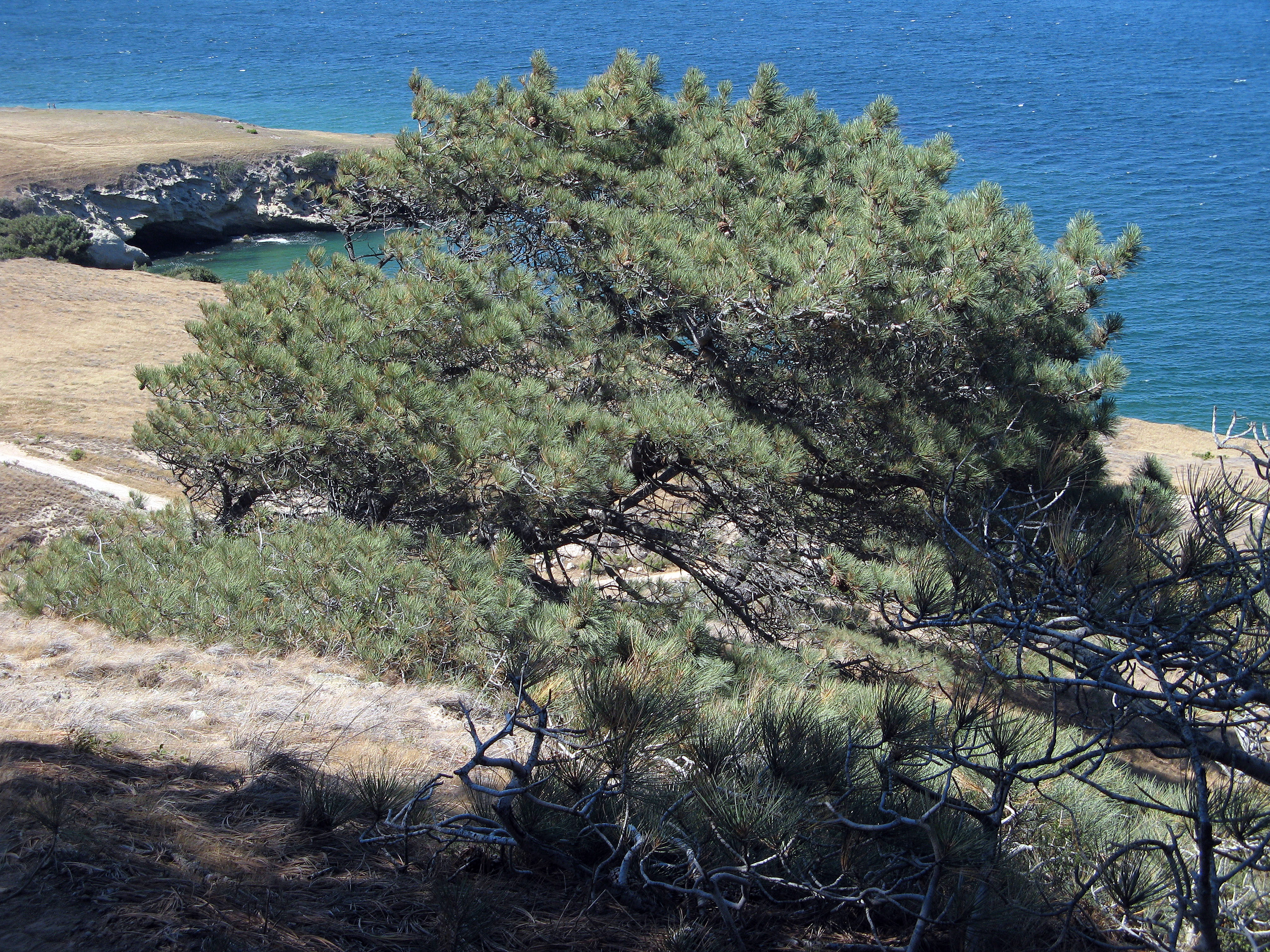

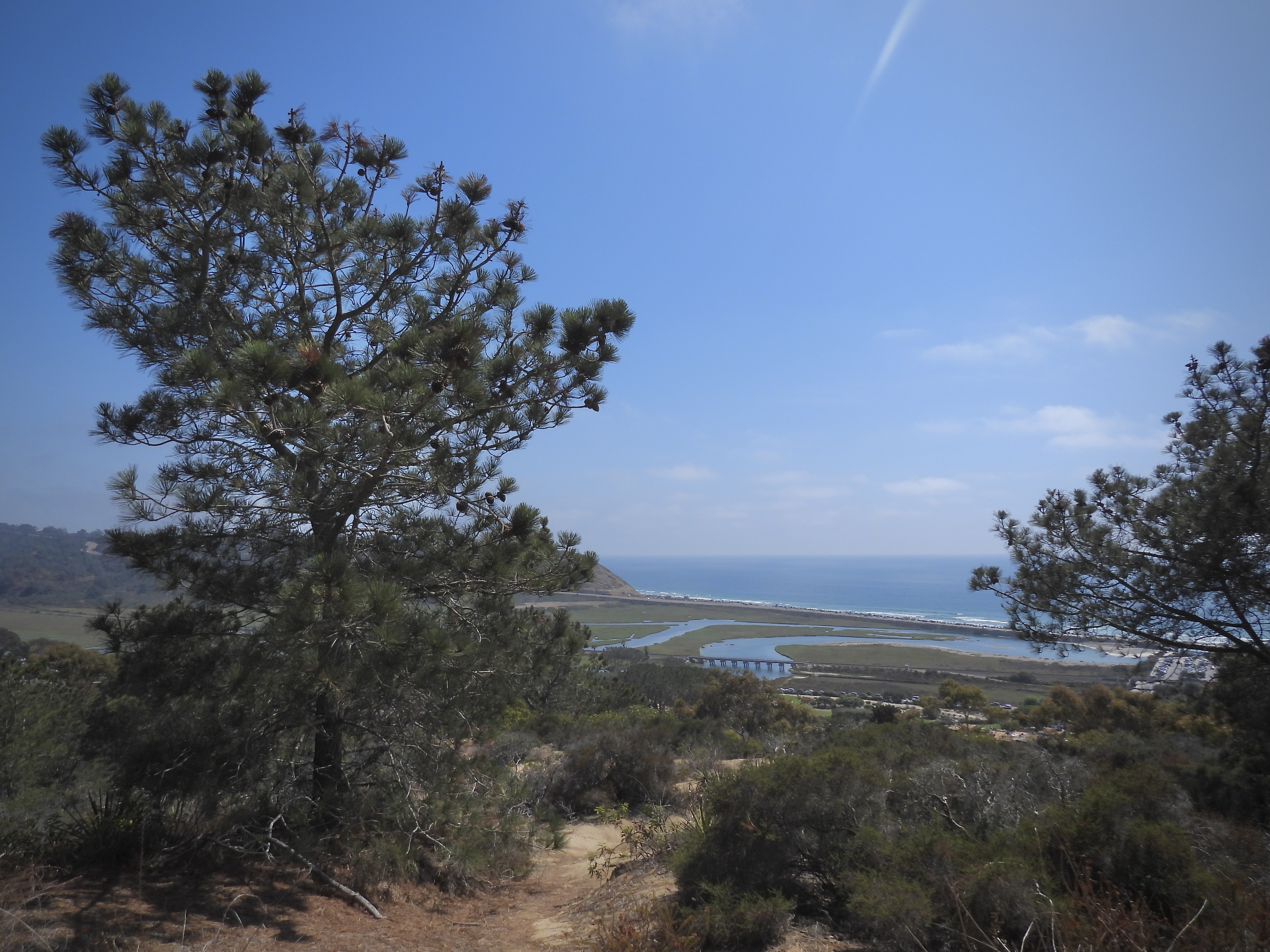
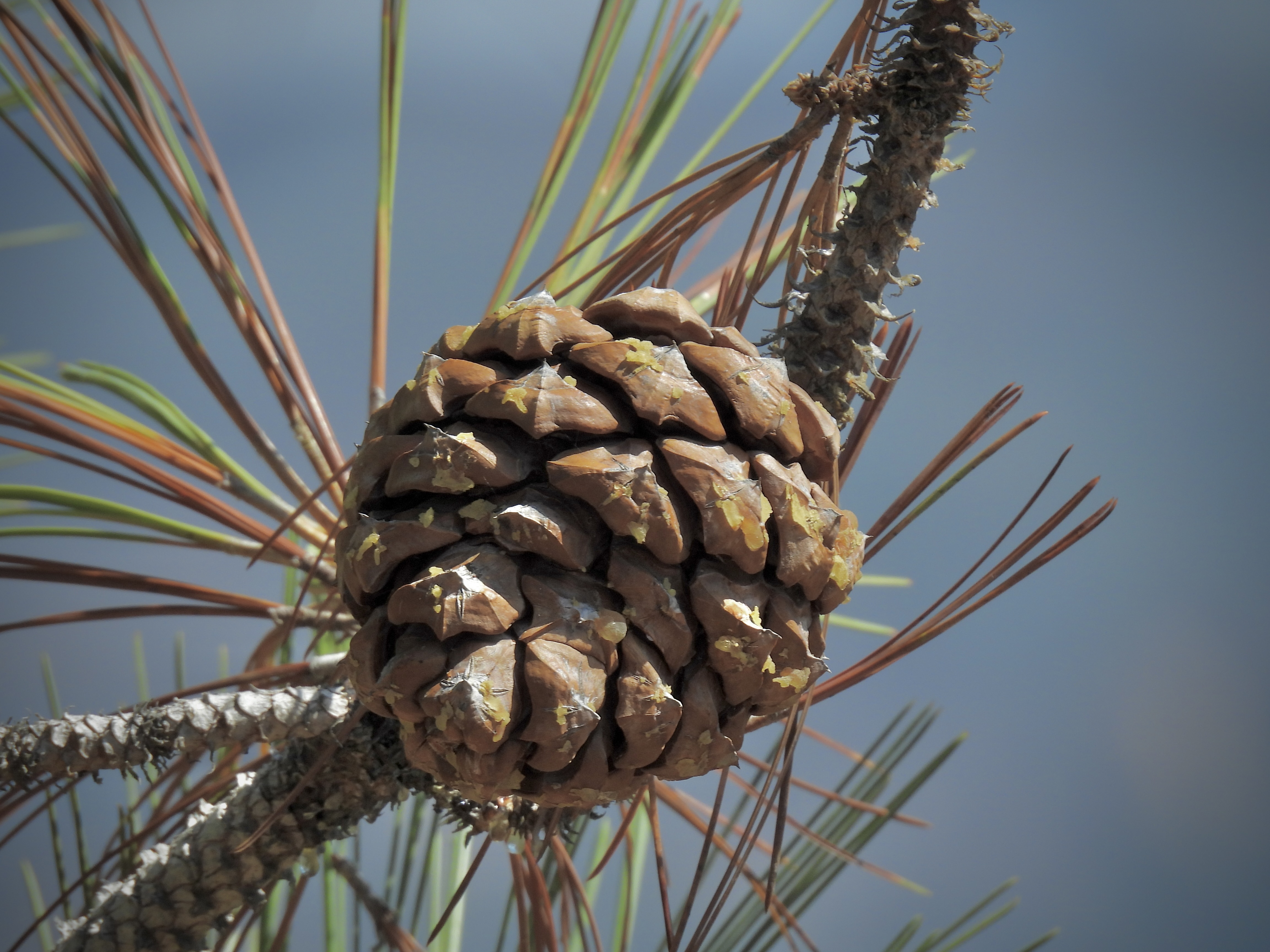
- A Torrey pine on the northeast coast of Santa Rosa Island, California A Torrey Pine Tree (Pinus torreyana) at Torrey Pines State Natural Reserve Extension. A Torrey Pine Tree (Pinus torreyana) at Torrey Pines State Natural Reserve in San Diego, California. (2026).

Conservation status
- Critically Endangered (IUCN 3.1)

- Critically Imperiled (NatureServe)

Scientific classification
- Kingdom: Plantae
- Clade: Tracheophytes
- Clade: Gymnosperms
- Division: Pinophyta
- Class: Pinopsida
- Order: Pinales
- Family: Pinaceae
- Genus: Pinus
- Subgenus: P. subg. Pinus
- Section: P. sect. Trifoliae
- Subsection: P. subsect. Ponderosae
- Species: P. torreyana

Binomial name
- Pinus torreyana Parry ex Carr.
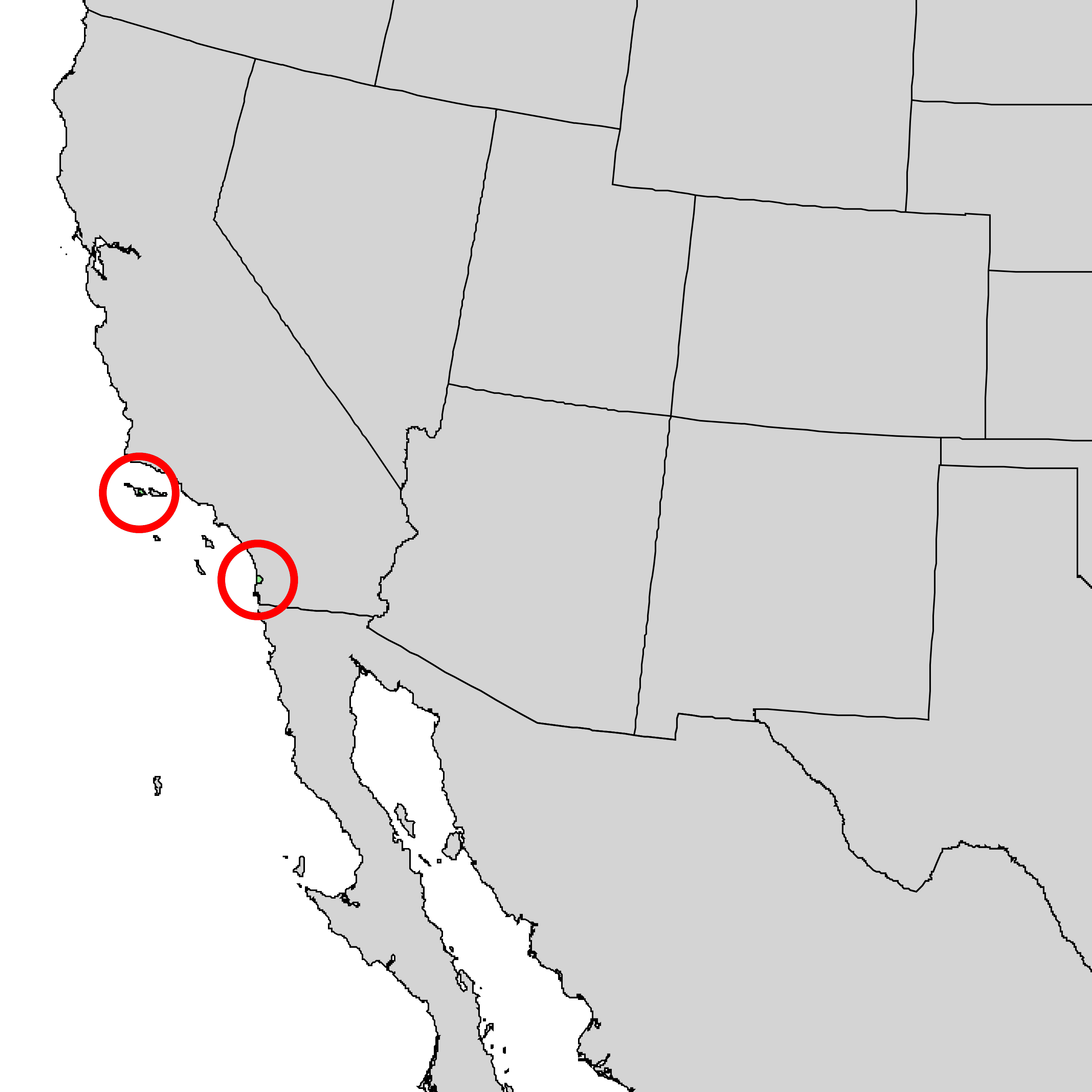
- Natural range of Pinus torreyana

= Torrey pine =

Species of pine tree in California

The Torrey pine (Pinus torreyana) is a rare pine species in California, United States. It is a critically endangered species growing only in coastal San Diego County, and on Santa Rosa Island, offshore from Santa Barbara in Santa Barbara County, and in Monterey County. The Torrey pine is endemic to the California coastal sage and chaparral ecoregion.

== Taxonomy ==
The species epithet torreyana is named for John Torrey, an American botanist, after whom the coniferous genus Torreya is also named.

== Description ==
Pinus torreyana is a broad, open-crowned pine tree growing to 8–17 meters (26–56 ft) tall in the wild, with 25–30 centimeters (9.8–11.8 in) long leaves ('needles') in groups of five. The cones are stout and heavy, typically 8–15 cm (3.1–5.9 in) long and broad, and contain large, hard-shelled, but edible, pine nuts. Like all pines, its needles are clustered into 'fascicles' that have a particular number of needles for each pine species; in the Torrey pine there are five needles in each fascicle. Like all pines, it has strobili, structures that function as a flower but look like a small cone, which for the Torrey pine look like a yellow bud in a male strobilus and like a small red cone in a female.

Torrey Pine tree forest with a Torrey Pine tree that has witches broom (gorilla nest) needles in Torrey Pines State Natural Reserve

Torrey pines are sometimes afflicted with witch's broom (or "gorilla's nest"), an unusually dense cluster of needles that looks somewhat like a bird's nest, caused by disease or other causes.

There are two subspecies or varieties. These are said to be distinguished by the following characteristics, as well as possibly differing in the terpenoid (beta-phellandrene, limonene, cineole, etc.) profile.

Image	Subspecies	Description	Distribution
	Pinus torreyana var. torreyana (Kral 1993)	There is much space between the branches. The leaf color is said to be generally gray-yellow-green. The cones are generally smaller than 13.5 cm (5.3 in) in width. The sharp tips at the end of the scales are generally less than 6 mm (0.24 in) in length. The seed is generally less than 11 mm (0.43 in) wide, and light to dark brown in color. Considered a Critically Imperiled Subspecies by NatureServe.	coast at Del Mar in San Diego County
	Pinus torreyana var. insularis (Haller) Silba 1990	The branches are crowded together. The leaf color is gray-blue-green. The cones are generally larger than 13.5 cm (5.3 in) in width. The sharp tips at the end of the scales are generally larger than 6 mm (0.24 in) in length. The seed is larger than 11mm wide, medium brown to more-or-less black. Considered a Critically Imperiled Subspecies by NatureServe.	Santa Rosa Island

== Threats ==
On May 15, 2026, a fire started on Santa Rosa Island, burning 18,379 acres or a third of the land area. As of September 1, 2026, the National Park Service indicated that 60% to 80% of Santa Rosa Island’s Torrey pines may perish as a result of the largest wildfire.

== Distribution ==
The extant population of Pinus torreyana is restricted to trees growing in a narrow strip along the Southern California coast in San Diego. There is also a population of the variety Pinus torreyana var. insularis in two groves on Santa Rosa Island, a California Channel Island off the coast of Santa Barbara, and in Pacific Grove on the foggy Monterey County coast, where a number of massive old specimens exist. The presence of Torrey pines along the semi-arid coast of San Diego and Santa Rosa Island (rainfall less than 15 inches per year) is probably a relict population of a much more extensive Ice Age distribution. Coastal fog during spring and summer along the San Diego and Santa Rosa Island coast provides just enough moisture to supplement the fairly low winter rainfall, allowing for survival of the species in the wild habitat zone.

== Ecology ==
The native habitat of Pinus torreyana is coastal sage scrub, a plant community, growing slowly in dry, sandy soil. The root system is extensive. A tiny seedling may quickly send a taproot down 60 centimeters (24 in) seeking moisture and nutrients. A mature tree may have roots extending 75 meters (246 ft). Exposed trees battered by coastal winds are often twisted into beautiful sculptural shapes resembling large bonsai, and rarely exceed 12 m (39 ft) tall.

The seeds are eaten by birds and rodents. Like most pine tree species, the seeds have a wing attached to them, but in this species it is papery, breaks off easily, and is entirely non-functional, so this tree is entirely reliant upon animals to disperse its seeds. The scrub jay (Aphelocoma californica) is the most important species when it comes to dispersal of the seeds (on the mainland). Scrub jays and perhaps also squirrels are thought to be spreading the species into adjacent parklands from gardens around San Diego.

The caterpillars of the moth Gloveria arizonensis have been confirmed to feed on this tree in the wild.

Stratification, which is the process of subjecting seeds to (moist) cold, encourages germination in Torrey pine seeds

== Uses ==
=== Food ===
The pine nuts were once eaten by the Kumeyaay tribe of Native American people.

=== Cultivation ===
Although considered endangered in the wild, Torrey pine is often planted as an ornamental tree around San Diego, coastal and inland southern California, and even the Central Valley. A single tree planted in a suburb of San Diego in the 1940s or 1950s has grown tall and straight, and to a large size, 108 feet (33 m). Shipley Nature Center states it can grow to 148 ft (45 m) in height in cultivation. It is sold by at least ten different plant nurseries in California as of 2020.

=== Forestry ===
Pinus torreyana has been considered as a plantation tree for forestry use in Australia, New Zealand and Kenya.

=== Culture ===
In San Diego County it is considered a local icon, where it lends its name to Torrey Pines State Natural Reserve, Torrey Pines State Beach, Torrey Pines Golf Course, Torrey Pines High School, and Torrey Pines Gliderport, as well as numerous local roads, parks, and businesses (e.g., Torrey Pines Bank, Torrey Pines Property Management Company, Torrey Pines Landscape Company, and Torrey Pines Law Group.)

== Conservation ==
There is some disagreement about the total population of Pinus torreyana. In general, only the populations in Torrey Pines State Natural Reserve and on Santa Rosa Island are deemed to count as the wild population, not the trees planted around San Diego and wider California. In the 1970s it was estimated that the population in the TPSR and on Santa Rosa Island was about 9,000 individuals, but many of these trees have since died due to forest fires, drought and a series of infestations of a bark beetle, as well as being stressed by air pollution. There were only a hundred trees surviving in the early 20th century. As of 2016 it is thought by the California Native Plant Society that the population of this species is some 3,000 individuals. In 2011, Aljos Farjon, assessing the conservation status of this species for the IUCN, estimated that the total population of P. torreyana was 4,500 individuals. He states that there is a slow decline of the numbers, especially of the trees not found within the TPSR on the mainland.

The Torrey pine is protected by a city tree ordinance in Del Mar, near the native habitat, and construction projects and residents require a permit for its removal.

== Gallery ==
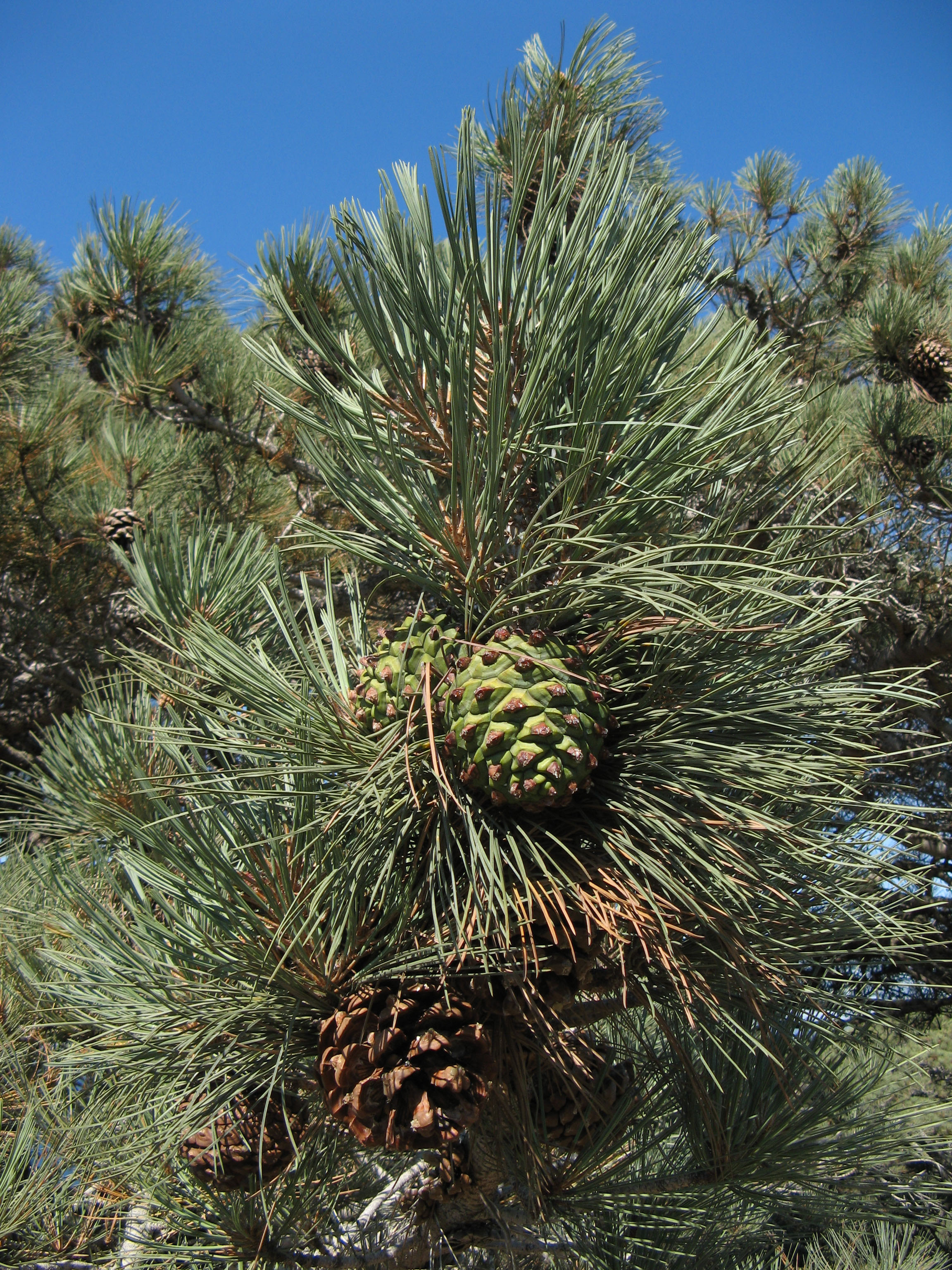
Torrey pine: female pine cones

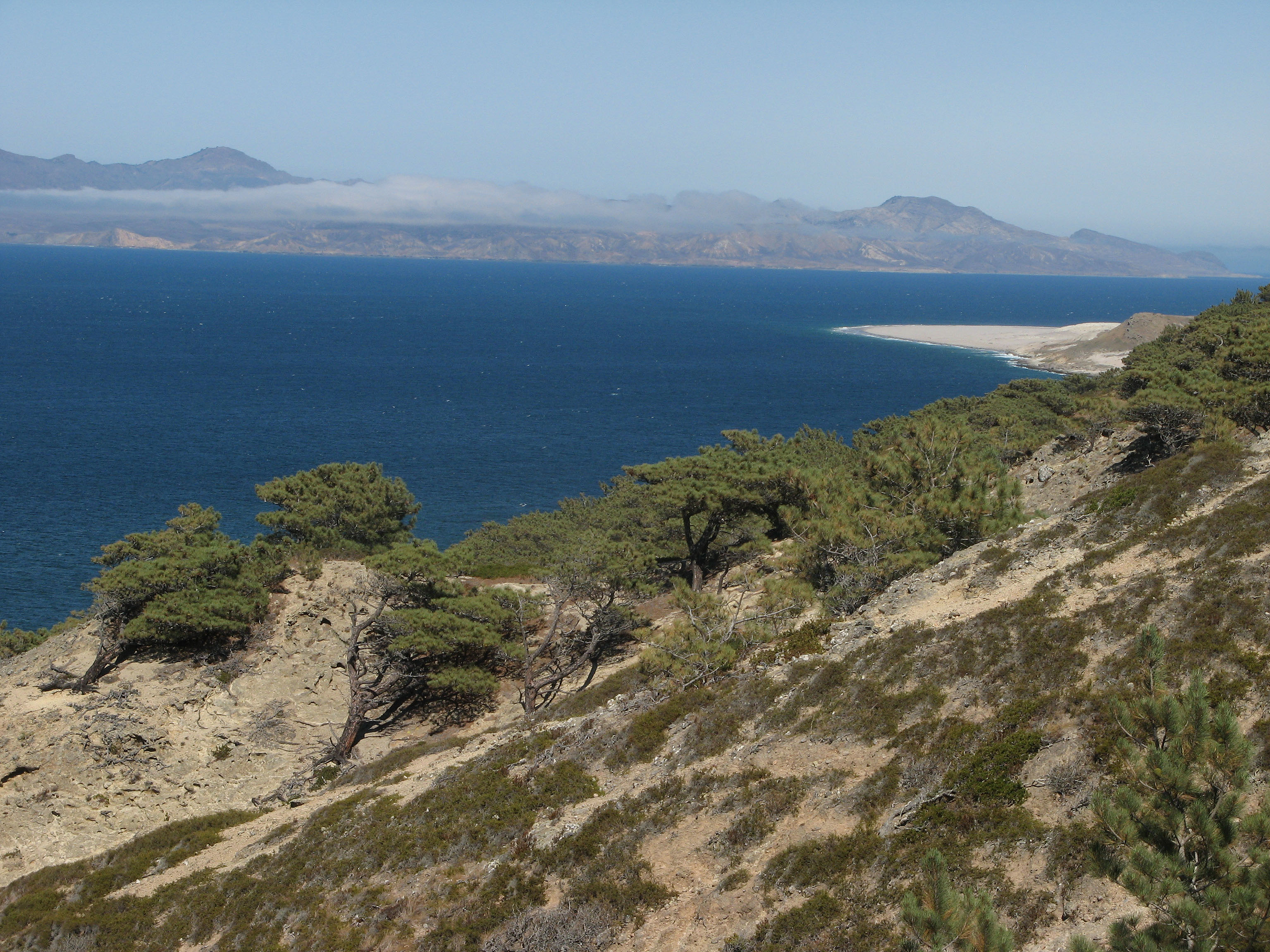
A wild Torrey pine grove, Santa Rosa Island, California

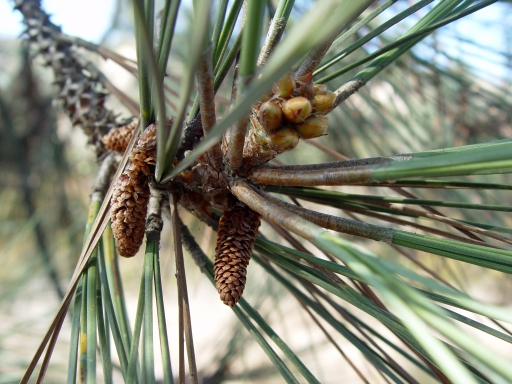
Strobili on a Torrey pine

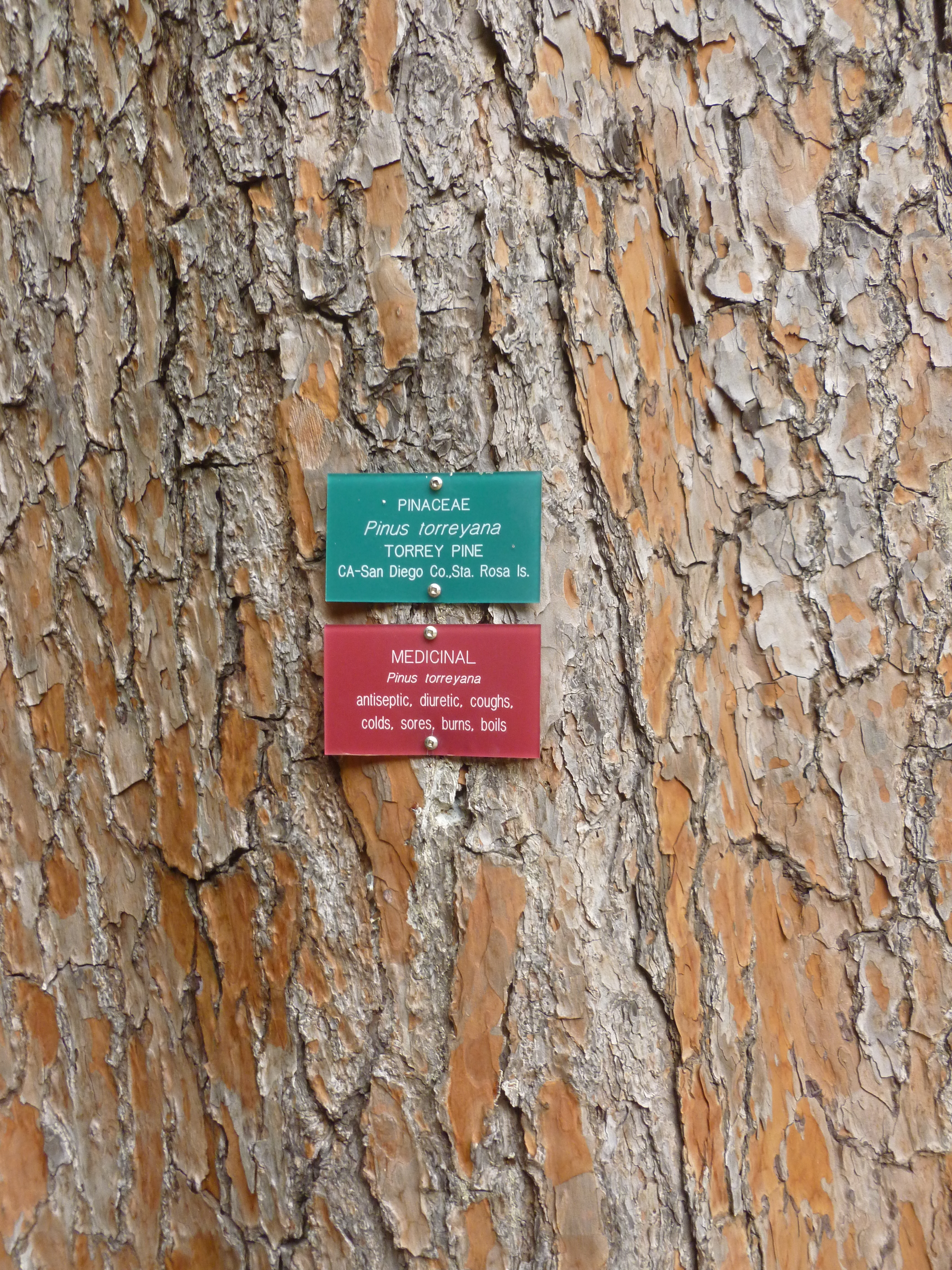
Torrey pine mature bark and nameplate in Mildred E. Mathias Botanical Garden, Los Angeles, California
