= John Cole's Book Shop =

Former bookstore in San Diego, California

Coordinates: 32.8452°N 117.2772°W

John Cole's Book and Craft Shop's book trade label.

John Cole's Book Shop (originally John Cole's Book and Craft Shop) was a bookstore in La Jolla, a community in San Diego, California. It was founded in 1946 by John (d. 1959) and Barbara Cole (d. 2004) on Ivanhoe Avenue. It moved in 1966 to Wisteria Cottage at 780 Prospect Street. The cottage had housed Ellen Browning Scripps' half-sister Virginia, and La Jolla Country Day School, prior to becoming the location of John Cole's Book Shop. Susan and Charles Cole, the daughter and son of John and Barbara Cole worked in the book shop as did Susan's daughter Trilce and Charles' son Zachary. Zachary sold harmonicas in the bookstore.

John Cole's Book Shop specialized in books about Mexico, specifically the Baja Peninsula and Mexican art. The La Jolla Museum of Contemporary Art lent sculptures to the store, which were displayed on the grounds. Parties were held for numerous authors over the years. Theodor Seuss Geisel, better known as Dr. Seuss, was a close friend of both John and Barbara Cole as early as the 1940s, lived in La Jolla, and regularly signed books for the shop. The shop closed in 2005, and the cottage was turned into a museum by the La Jolla Historical Society.
