= Dana Montlack =

American interdisciplinary artist

Dana Montlack is an American interdisciplinary artist whose installations and photographic works incorporate scientific data and microscopic imagery. Her work often results from collaborations with scientific and academic institutions, including the Scripps Institution of Oceanography.

== Education ==
Montlack received a Bachelor of Fine Arts in sculpture from the University of California, Santa Cruz and earned a Master of Fine Arts in mixed media from the Otis Parsons College of Art and Design.

== Career and practice ==
Montlack's practice utilizes macro and microscopic photography to document natural systems and environmental data. Her work often takes the form of layered digital compositions and site-specific installations.

Critics have noted her work for its "scientific precision" and "highly refined aesthetic." Reviewing her work for Lenscratch, Aline Smithson described her process as "transform[ing] the actual physical world... into sensual abstractions that never quite lose their original referent," noting her method of re-interpreting underwater life into "painterly photo collages."

=== Institutional collaborations ===
From 2011 to 2014, Montlack collaborated with the Scripps Institution of Oceanography. This culminated in the exhibition Sea of Cortez, on view at the Museum of Contemporary Art San Diego (MCASD) through January 2014. The exhibition featured works inspired by marine research and the writings of John Steinbeck, described by critics as a "new taxonomy of place" created through the layering of source imagery.

In 2017, she participated in Weather on Steroids: The Art of Climate Change Science, an exhibition organized by the La Jolla Historical Society and the San Diego Central Library. Her installation for the project, Seeing Through Water, Seeing Through Weather, visualized the effects of CO2 buildup on marine biodiversity and was developed in collaboration with Scripps scientists including Alexander Gershunov.

In 2022, Montlack was selected for the Artists, Writers, and Scholars program by the University of Georgia's Marine Extension and Georgia Sea Grant. This grant supported a collaboration with Georgia Institute of Technology biologist Joel Kostka to visualize climate impacts on coastal ecosystems.

In 2024, Montlack participated in the International Ocean Discovery Program (IODP) "School of Rock" workshop aboard the JOIDES Resolution. In 2025, she exhibited in Preternatural at Spruill Gallery in Atlanta alongside artist Pam Longobardi.

=== Public art and installations ===
In 2018, Montlack contributed to the collaborative installation Ocean Tunnel, which debuted at Burning Man and was subsequently exhibited at the Scripps Institution of Oceanography in 2019.

In 2024, the Town of Hilton Head Island commissioned Montlack for the Shelter Cove Sculpture Trail. She installed three site-specific sculptures, Marsh, Forest, and Ocean, composed of kiln-fired glass panels. The works incorporate light-reactive layered imagery of local flora and fauna.

== Collections ==
Montlack’s work is held in permanent public and institutional collections, including:

- Museum of Contemporary Art San Diego
- San Diego Public Library: Acquired by the City of San Diego Commission for Arts and Culture for the North University Branch Library in 2013.
