= La Jolla Reading Room =

Coordinates: 32°50′28″N 117°16′40″W

- Location: Girard Avenue and Wall Street (1898-1921); 7590 Draper Avenue (c. 1930–2005); The Bishop's School (2005–)
- Established: 1898
- Dissolved: 1921

The La Jolla Reading Room was the first library in La Jolla, California. Constructed in 1898, it is a historic structure that was moved to the campus of The Bishop's School in 2005. In 2000, the City of San Diego designated it as a historical landmark (HRBS 447).

== History ==
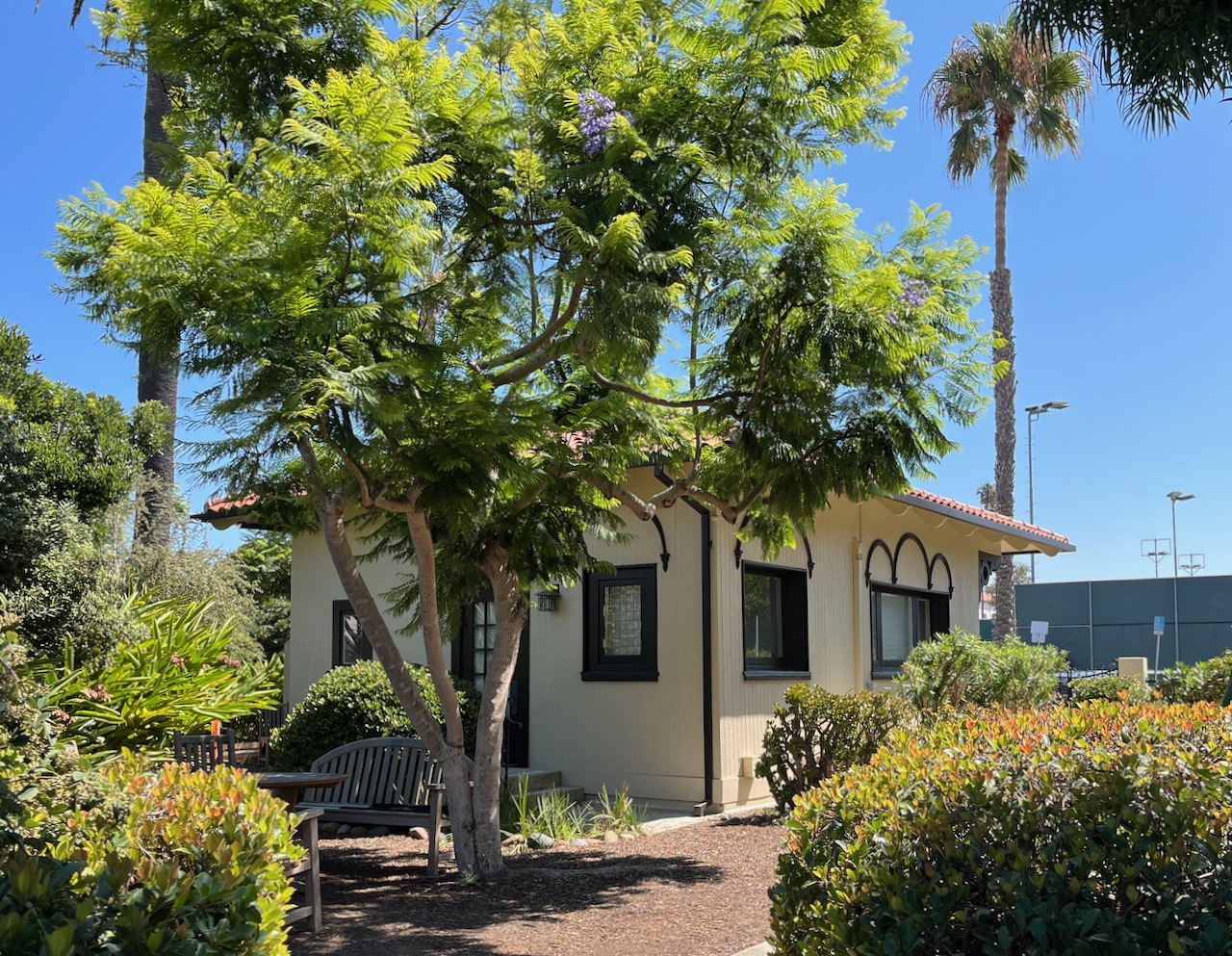
La Jolla Reading Room (1898), La Jolla, CA, 2024

Built in 1898, the library was originally located on the northeast corner of Girard Ave. and Wall St. at the heart of what would become the business district.

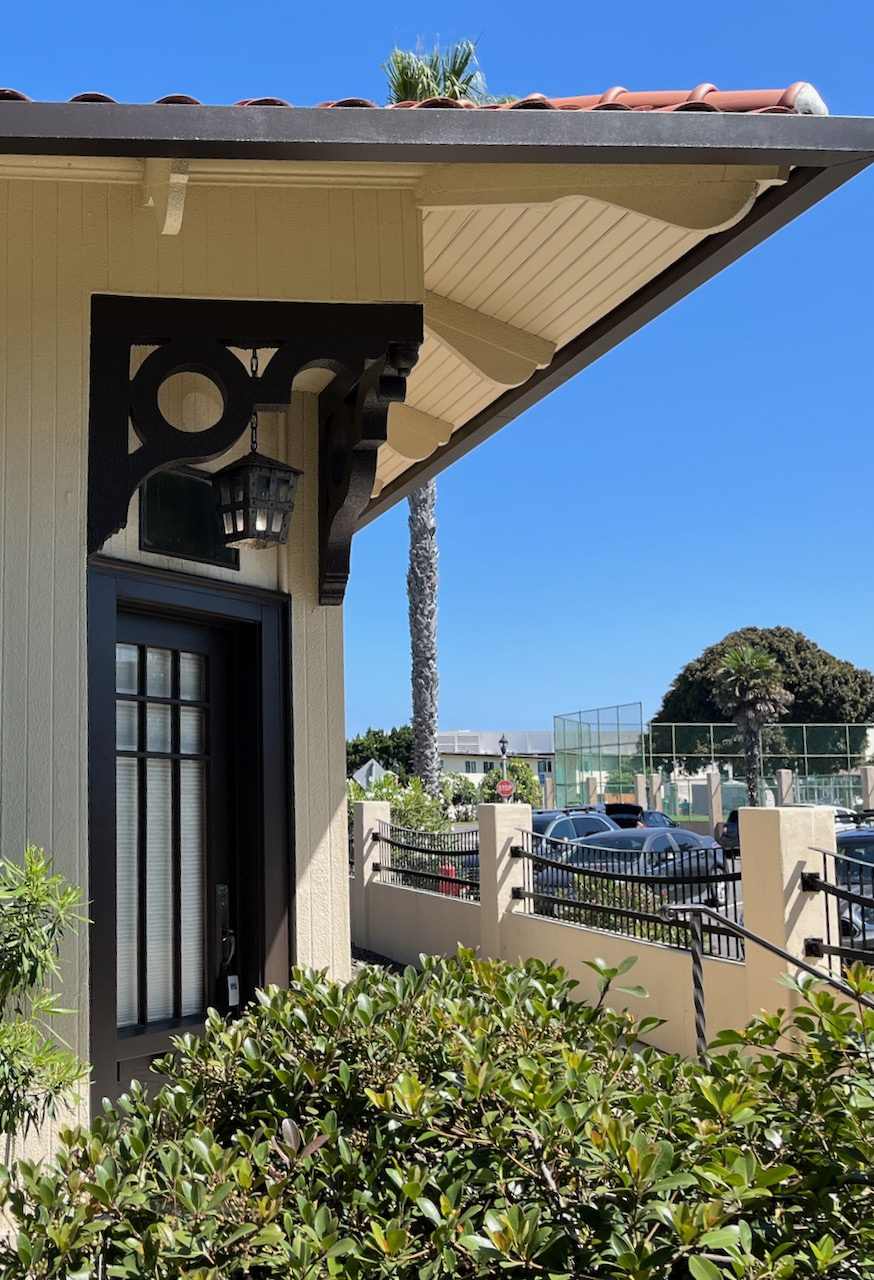
Entrance to La Jolla Reading Room (1898), La Jolla, CA, 2024

La Jolla, a suburb developed by railroad interests, was a popular tourist destination that attracted visitors from the East, particularly during the winter months. It had a population of around 350, many of whom lived in rustic bungalows perched on the cliffs overlooking the Pacific Ocean.

The Reading Room was the gift of Florence Sawyer (1874–1942), a native of Oakland, California, a graduate of University of California, Berkeley, and a member of the Home of Truth, a group that believed that illness could be cured through New Thought metaphysics.

Sawyer came to La Jolla in 1895 as a companion to Julia H. Spear (1843–1897) of Burlington, Vermont, who had undergone a surgical operation in Los Angeles and planned to recover in La Jolla. Julia's elderly mother, Catherine Spear, accompanied them. After Julia's death in 1897, Florence cared for Catherine Spear until the latter's death in 1899.

Frances Sawyer donated the Reading Room in memory of the Spears. In 1899, a group of women, all members of the La Jolla Reading Club, incorporated as the La Jolla Library Association to maintain the library. The group was chaired by philanthropist Ellen Browning Scripps.

The Reading Room became a focal point for the cultural life of early La Jolla. In 1902, the La Jolla Reading Club became The La Jolla Woman's Club.

The Reading Room operated as a private library, managed by the Library Association of La Jolla until 1920.

By 1921, La Jolla had outgrown the old Reading Room. It was moved from its original location and was replaced by the La Jolla Memorial Library, now the Athenaeum Music & Arts Library.

At some point between 1926 and 1932, the Reading Room was moved to 7590 Draper Ave. Here, it began a new life as a rental property in the hub of La Jolla's working-class community. Alicia Stevens, a member of the Rodriguez family who founded the La Jolla Canyon pottery works, purchased the property and lived there between 1968 and 1998.

In 2000, the City of San Diego designated the La Jolla Reading Room as a historical landmark (HRBS 447). It was moved to the campus of The Bishop's School in 2005.

== Architectural style ==
Architecturally, the Reading Room is a Folk Victorian structure that had Mission Revival features, notably a tiled roof. It is of single wood-wall construction and measures 22 by 30 feet (6.7 m × 9.1 m). A corner is cut off at a 45-degree angle to define the entry. The exterior is composed of 1-by-4-inch (2.5 cm × 10.2 cm) vertical wood siding with a moderately pitched roof, exposed rafters, and sculptured rafter tales. It has wide, overhanging eaves and decorative arched window trim.
