= Birch Aquarium at Scripps =

Public aquarium in San Diego, California, United States

Birch Aquarium

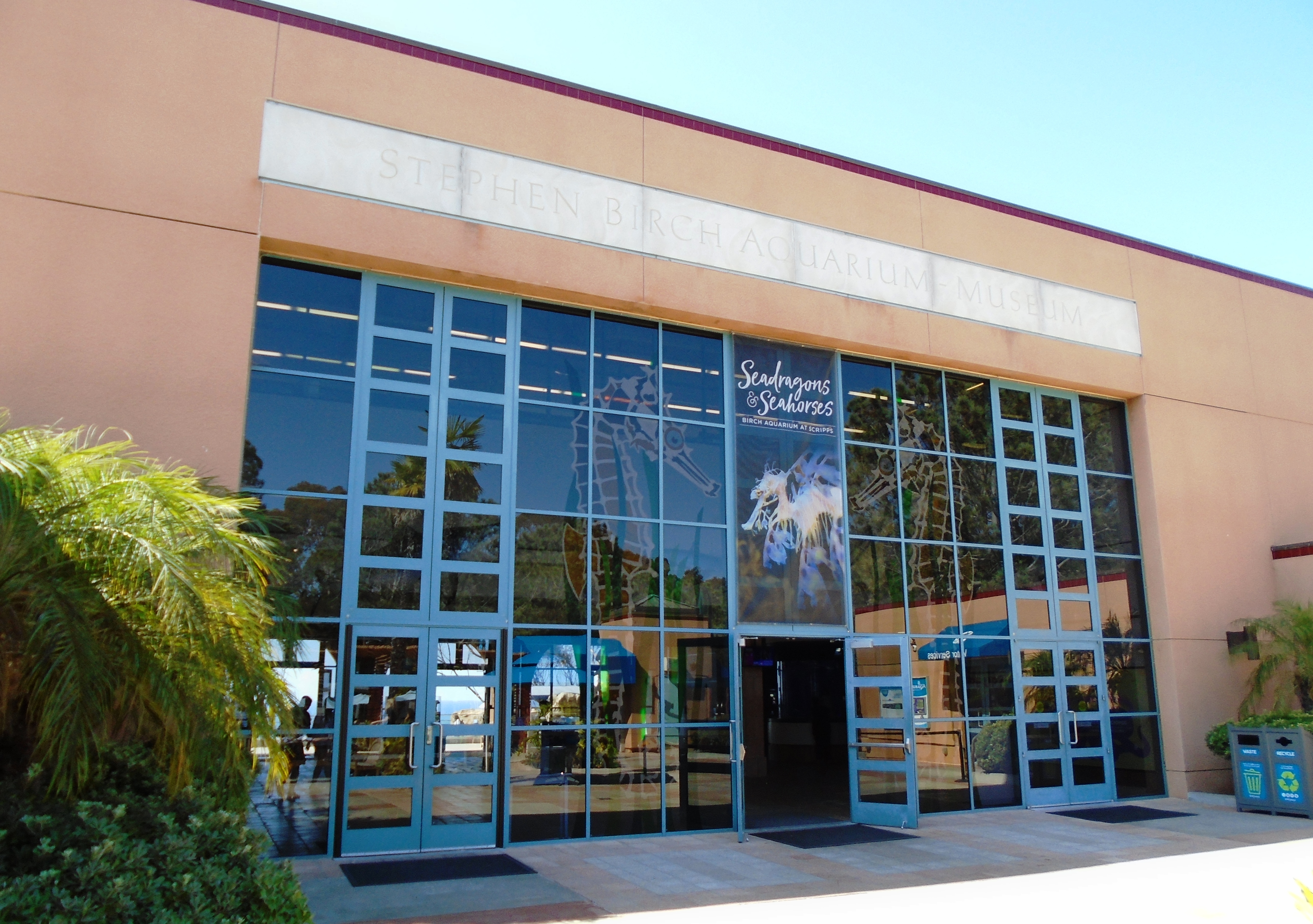
- Interactive map of Birch Aquarium
- 32°51′57″N 117°15′02″W
- Date opened: 1903
- Location: Scripps Institution of Oceanography, University of California, San Diego, San Diego, California
- No. of animals: 3,000+
- No. of species: 380
- Volume of largest tank: 70,000 U.S. gal (260,000 L)
- Annual visitors: 500,000+
- Memberships: AZA
- Website: aquarium.ucsd.edu

Birch Aquarium is a public aquarium in La Jolla, a community of San Diego, California. It serves as the public outreach center for Scripps Institution of Oceanography at the University of California, San Diego, with over half a million people visiting the aquarium each year.

The aquarium houses more than 9,000 animals representing over 400 species. The hilltop site provides views of La Jolla Shores and the Pacific Ocean. The aquarium is an accredited member of the Association of Zoos and Aquariums (AZA).

== History ==
The original Scripps marine biological laboratory, 1910

The aquarium was established in 1903 after the Marine Biological Association of San Diego was created to conduct marine research in the local waters of the Pacific Ocean (its name was later changed to the Scripps Institution of Oceanography to honor supporters Ellen Browning Scripps and E.W. Scripps, part of the Scripps family of newspaper pioneers). The founders built and maintained the small public aquarium and museum to communicate their discoveries to the world.

The researchers outgrew their modest laboratory in the boathouse of the Hotel del Coronado and moved to a small laboratory at La Jolla Cove in 1905. Several years later, the association purchased 174 acres (70 ha) at La Jolla Shores for $1,000 at a public auction from the city of San Diego. The first permanent building at the new site, the Old Scripps Building, was constructed in 1910. Today it is listed on the National Register of Historic Places.

In 1915, the first building devoted solely to an aquarium was built on the Scripps campus. The small, wooden structure contained 19 tanks ranging in size from 96 to 228 U.S. gallons (360 to 860 L). The oceanographic museum was located in a nearby building.

The Scripps Aquarium-Museum was completed in 1950. Named to honor former institution director T. Wayland Vaughan, it opened in 1951 as the Thomas Wayland Vaughan Aquarium. The three-story facility served the institution for more than 40 years. A ring of 18 tanks, the largest at 2,000 U.S. gallons (7,600 L), surrounded a central museum of glass exhibit cases displaying Scripps research projects. Within a month of its opening, visitors from all 48 states had signed the guest book.

In 1985, the Stephen and Mary Birch Foundation started a fund-raising effort for a new aquarium by donating $6 million. UC San Diego donated the land. JCJ Architecture of San Diego was selected as the design architect, and in 1992, the current $14 million aquarium opened its doors, then known as the Stephen Birch Aquarium-Museum. Shortly afterwards, its name was changed to Birch Aquarium at Scripps. In March 1996, the 40 ft (12 m) bronze whale statues "The Legacy" were unveiled in memory of Ted Scripps II. Birch Aquarium celebrated its 20th anniversary in September 2012 by introducing a new visual identity.

There is currently a proposition to expand the aquarium and its facilities throughout 2028.

The annual “kids free San Diego” goes through October for the Birch Aquarium. The Birch Aquarium served as a show case for the campaign by giving free tickets for any child under 12 years old. All around the San Diego region, kids have access to over 100 special deals which include free admission to more than 60 museums and attractions with complementary dinning and hotel perks. Many local resorts and hotels are pitching in by offering deals with food, rentals, and discounts for families who are visiting going to the aquarium.

== Exhibits ==
At 64,157 square feet (5,960.4 m^{2}), Birch Aquarium is designed around a central lobby with entrances to exhibit areas. Display tanks contain 175,000 U.S. gallons (660,000 L) of seawater.

=== Adam R. Scripps Living Seas Gallery ===
Adam R. Scripps Living Seas Gallery opened to the public on May 22, 2025. Living Seas, which replaces the aquarium’s Hall of Fishes, invites guests to explore the wonders of our ocean planet on an immersive journey to uncover the splendor of the Pacific. It is the largest capital project in the history of the aquarium.

In Living Seas, guests can venture into the world of the Giant Pacific octopus, experience life under the pier in a Scripps Pier habitat with an up-close view of life on the pilings, and peer into an open ocean habitat featuring schooling fish and the aquarium’s rescued Loggerhead sea turtle. There is also a tropical coral habitat where mangrove roots appear to grow organically from the gallery walls.

=== Hall of Fishes ===
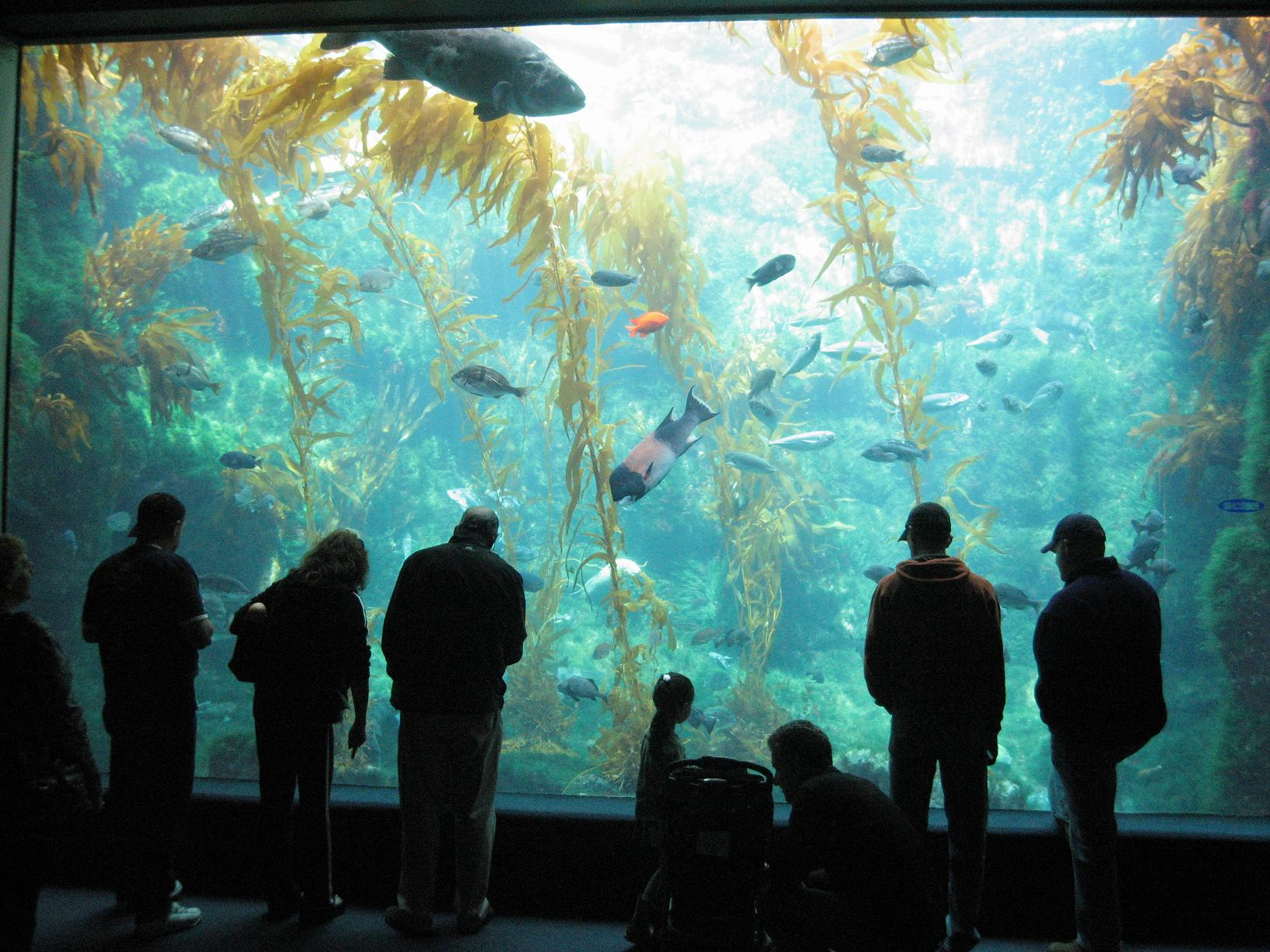
70,000-U.S.-gallon (260,000 L) kelp tank

Hall of Fishes featured more than 60 tanks of Pacific fishes and invertebrates. The path along the Hall of Fishes followed the currents of the North Pacific Gyre, starting with tanks inspired by the Pacific Northwest, then tanks with organisms from California, followed by tanks with organisms from Mexico and Baja California, ending with tanks inspired by the Indo-Pacific. The largest habitat was a 70,000-U.S.-gallon (260,000 L) kelp forest habitat that is now part of Living Seas. The habitat can be viewed live online through the Kelp Cam. The Hall of Fishes was closed in September, 2024 for renovations and the development of a new attraction, called Living Seas.

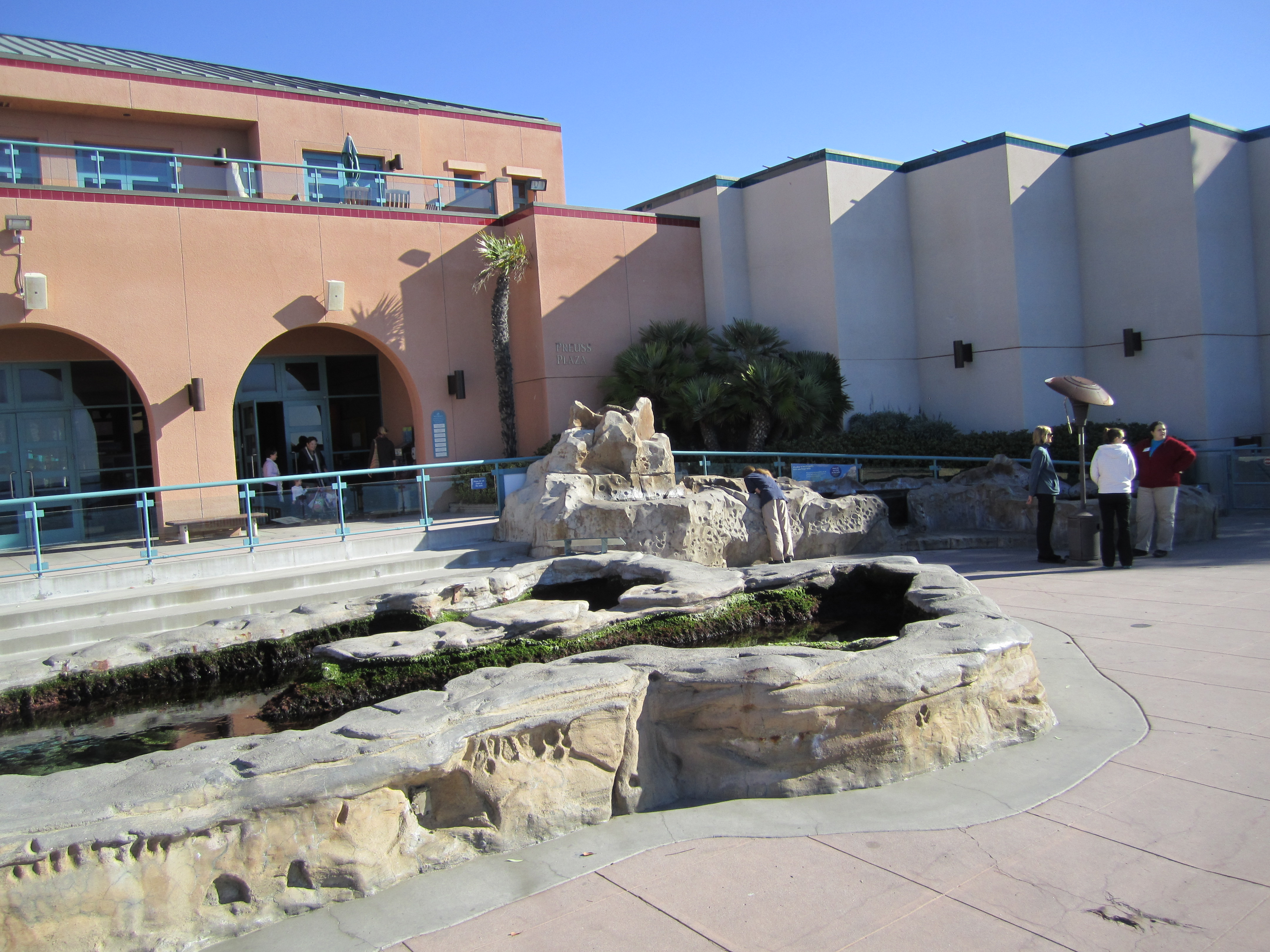
Tide-Pool Plaza at Birch Aquarium

=== Tide-Pool Plaza ===
Tide-Pool Plaza features three living tide pools where visitors can touch and learn about tide-pool animals with docents. Windows in the habitats provide up-close views of starfish, hermit crabs, sea cucumbers, lobsters, and other animals local to San Diego's tide pools. The tide pool overlooks La Jolla and the Pacific Ocean.

=== Seadragons & Seahorses ===
Birch Aquarium promotes sea dragon conservation. In this exhibition is found a multitude of fishes in the seadragon family such as: seahorses, pipefish, sea dragons, etc. Birch Aquarium has focused on this species’ rehabilitation because of the impacts that climate change and poaching have on the ocean.

The exhibit features more than a dozen seahorse species and their relatives, a special seahorse nursery, and hands-on activities for all ages about seahorse biology. Birch Aquarium is a world leader in seahorse propagation, reducing the need for other zoos and aquariums to collect from the wild.

In March 2023, The Birch Aquarium's seadragon conservation program successfully bred 70 weedy seadragons. The aquarium had previously bred two seadragons in 2020, however, the event in 2023 was the first occurrence inside an exhibit.

=== Beyster Family Little Blue Penguins ===
The Beyster Family Little Blue Penguins exhibit is named after the long-time supporters, Beyster Family, who generously gifted $1 million to Scripps Institution of Oceanography and Birch Aquarium. This exhibit features little blue penguins that live in an 18,000 gallon penguin lagoon that imitates the coast of Australia and New Zealand where the little blues live. It also includes a small amphitheater that allows guests to observe the penguins, as well as a "discovery cove" for children to get a closer look at these penguins.

=== Blue Beach ===
Blue Beach serves as a place for people to connect with the ocean and each other. This area features a 4,500-square-foot floor mural depicting the bathymetry (or map of the depth) of the underwater canyons off La Jolla Shores, plus shark and ray viewing, comfy seating, and fun outdoor games, all surrounded by stunning ocean views.

=== Shark and Ray habitat ===
Blue Beach is home to a shark and ray habitat that is a sandy bottomed outside exhibit based on the sea floor of La Jolla. This exhibit features various sharks and rays, including leopard sharks and pacific angelsharks.

=== The Axolotl's Garden ===
Axolotl

A new Axolotl exhibit called The Axolotl's Garden or El Jardín del Ajolote opened on October 21, 2026. This species is native to Mexico and it is the only spot where they can be found in the wild.This exhibit also includes Tequila Splitfins and Blind Cave Tetras.

This project aims to connect people with Mexican culture and people who are using ancestral and new knowledge to preserve habitats. Axolotls are on the brink of extinction in Lake Xochimilco in Mexico City. The exhibit features a view into the world of the axolotl and the project will recognize the ecosystem of San Diego and Tijana artists who raise awareness of endangered species through their art. Birch Aquarium aims and hopes that this new exhibit will inspire action for endangered species.

== Gallery ==
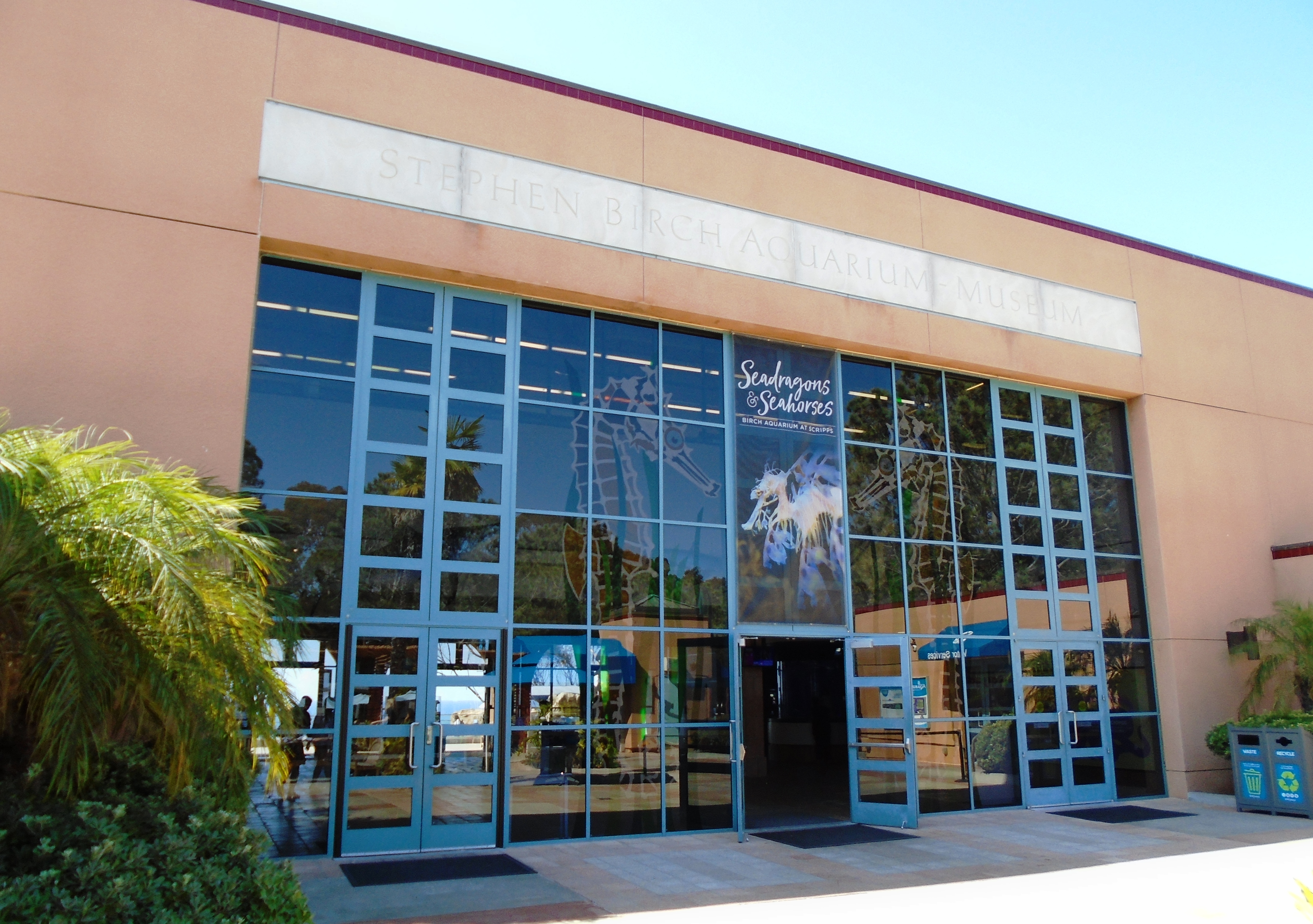
Entrance

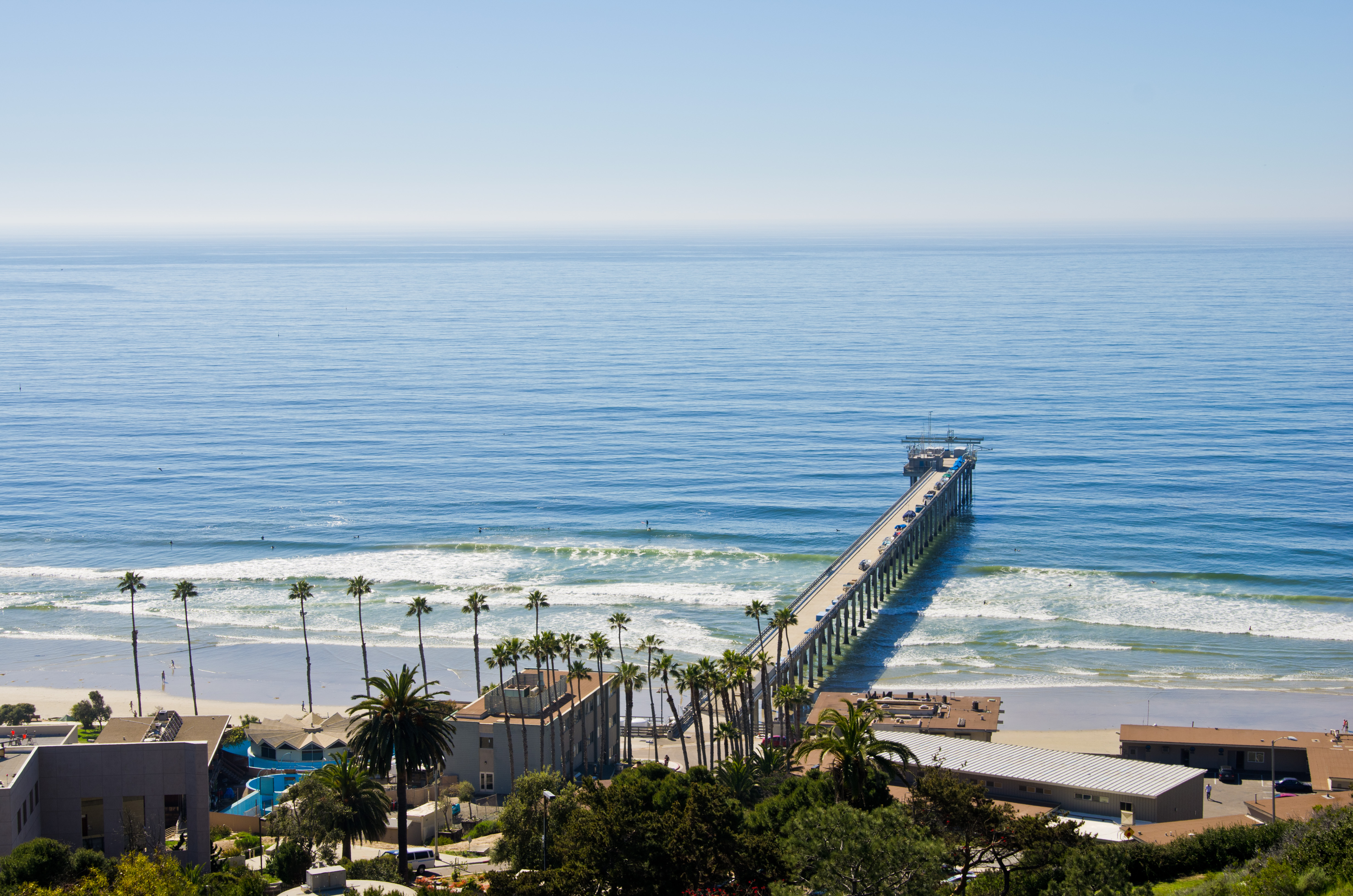
Scripps Pier in front of the aquarium

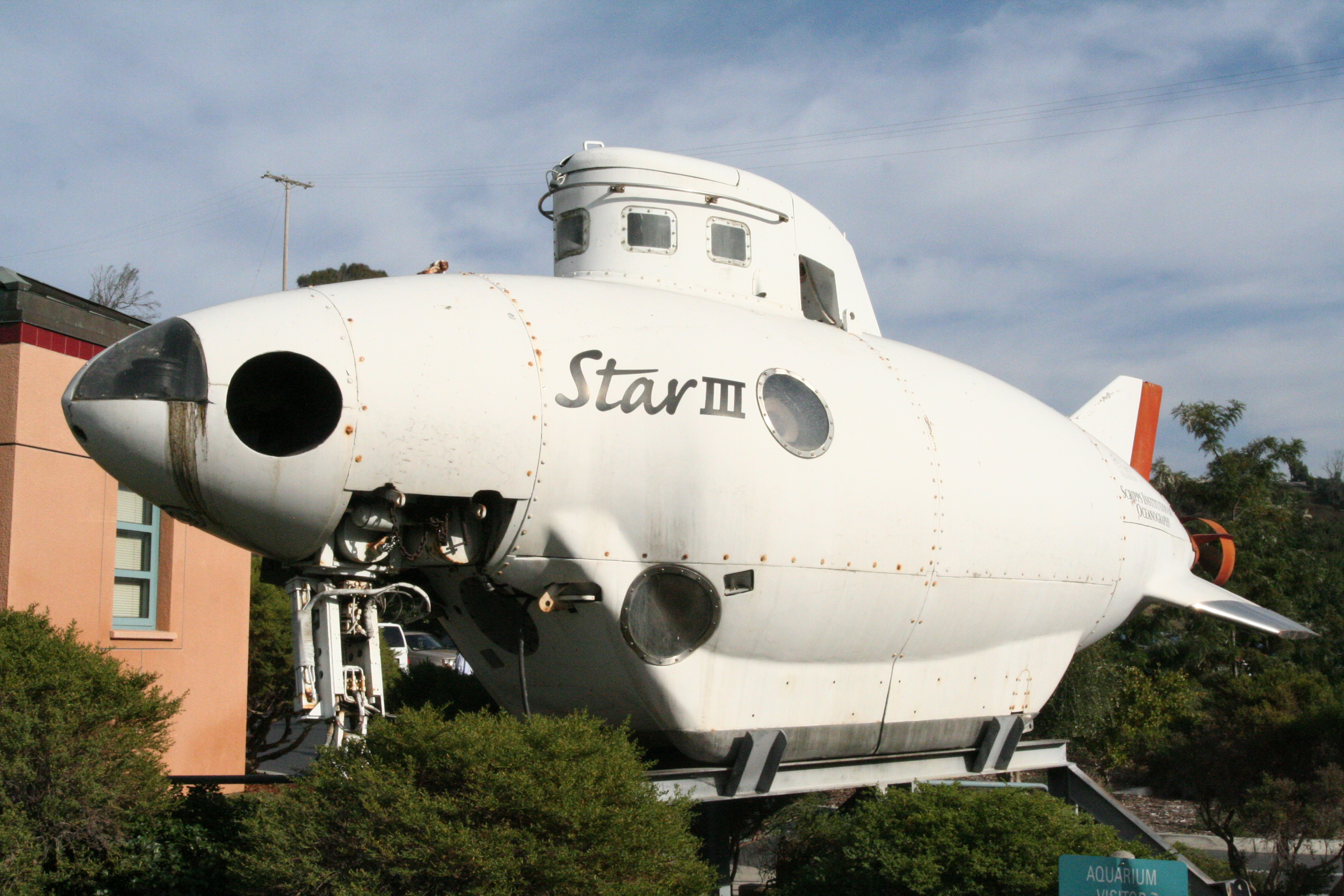
Star III submersible on display

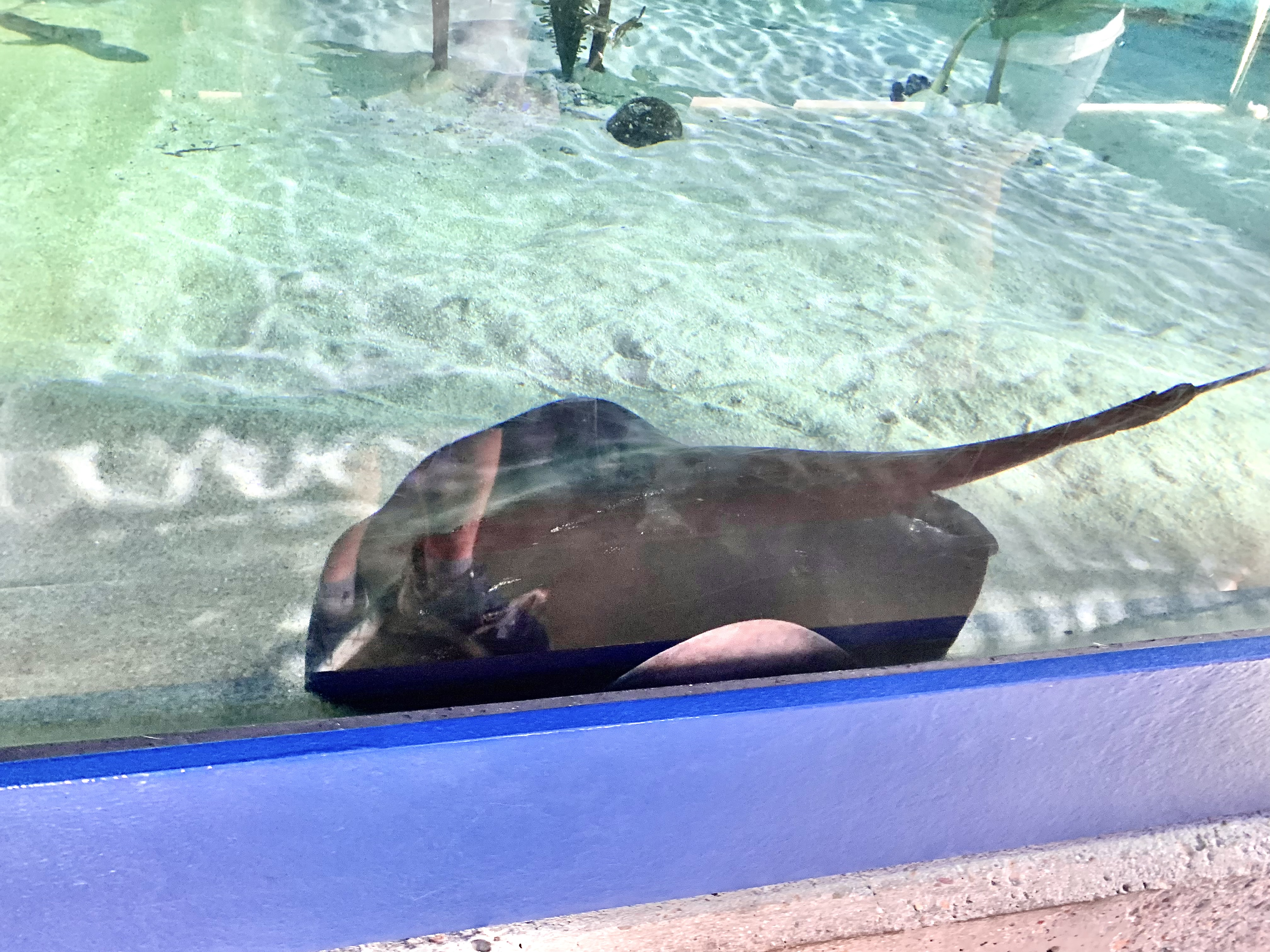
Diamond stingray (Hypanus dipterurus)

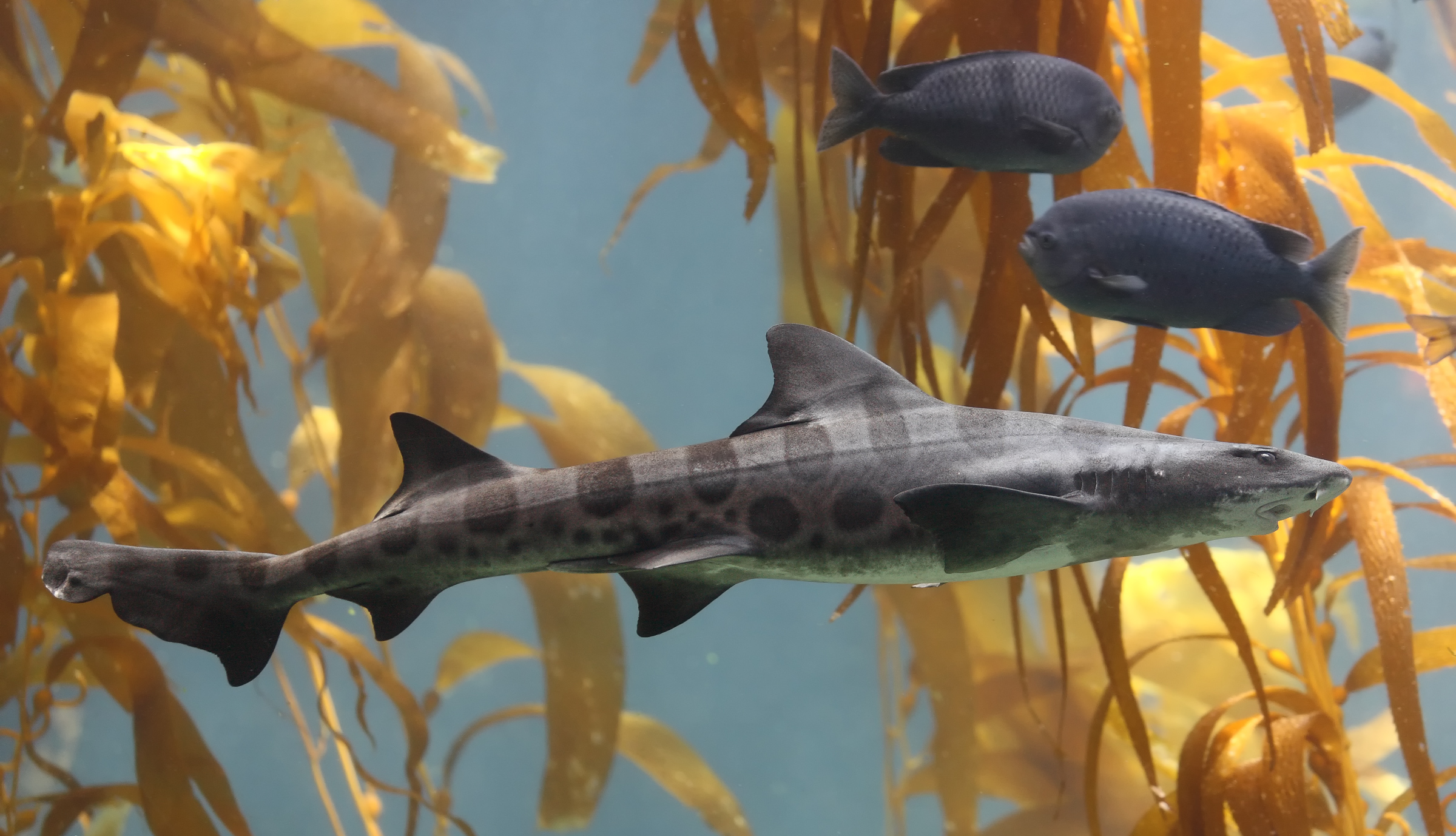
Leopard shark (Triakis semifasciata)

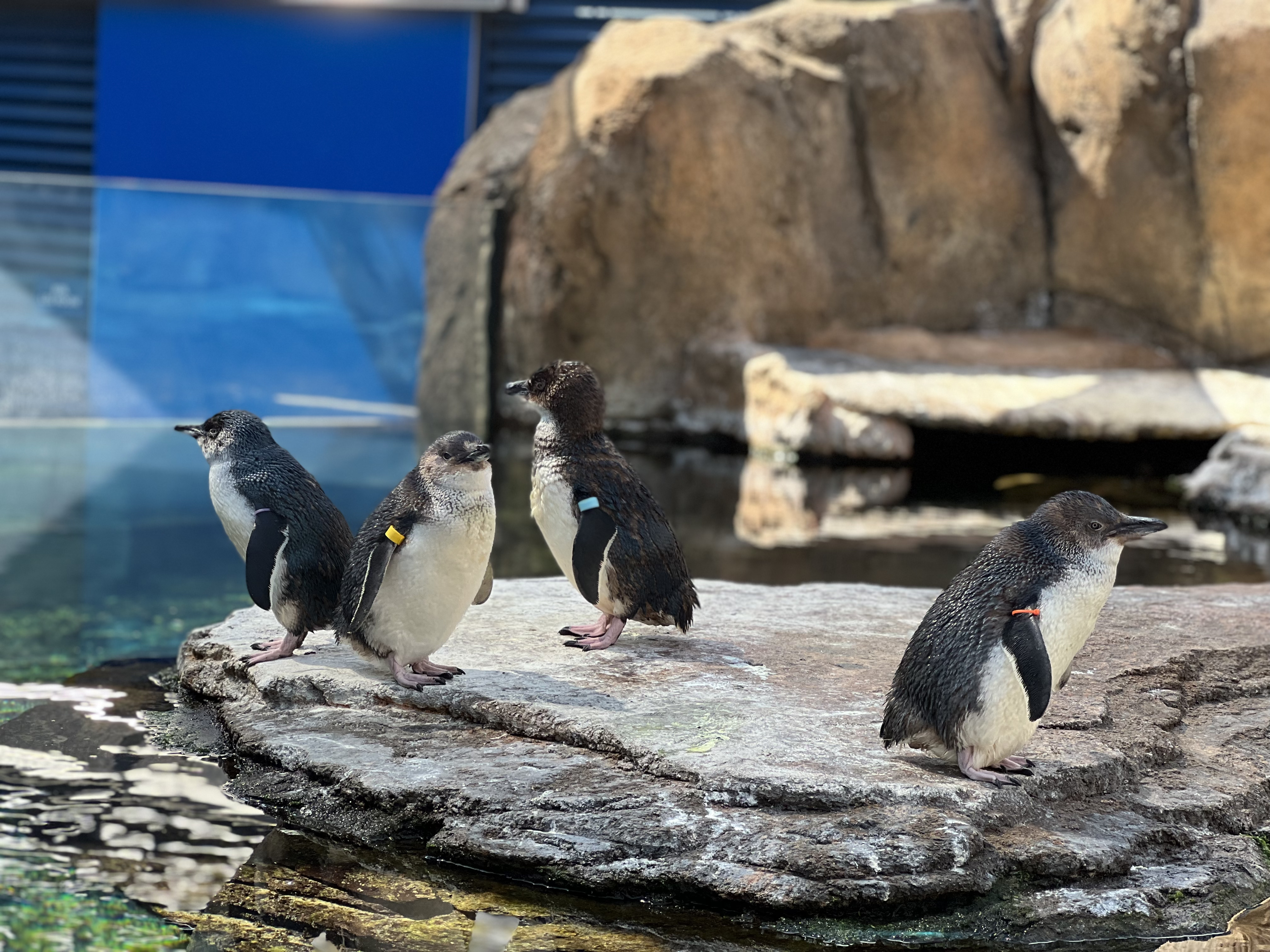
Little penguins (Eudyptula minor)

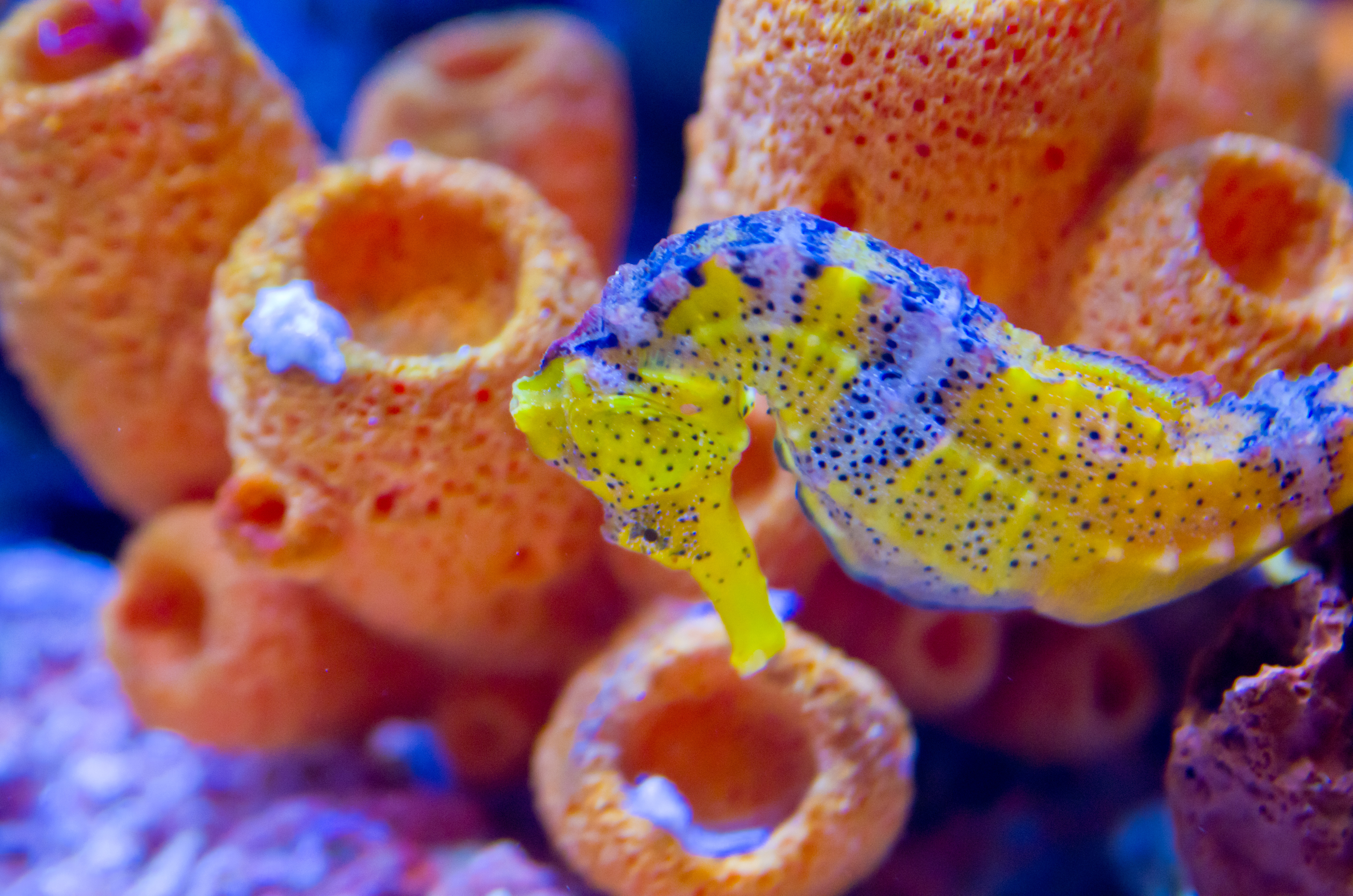
Seahorse

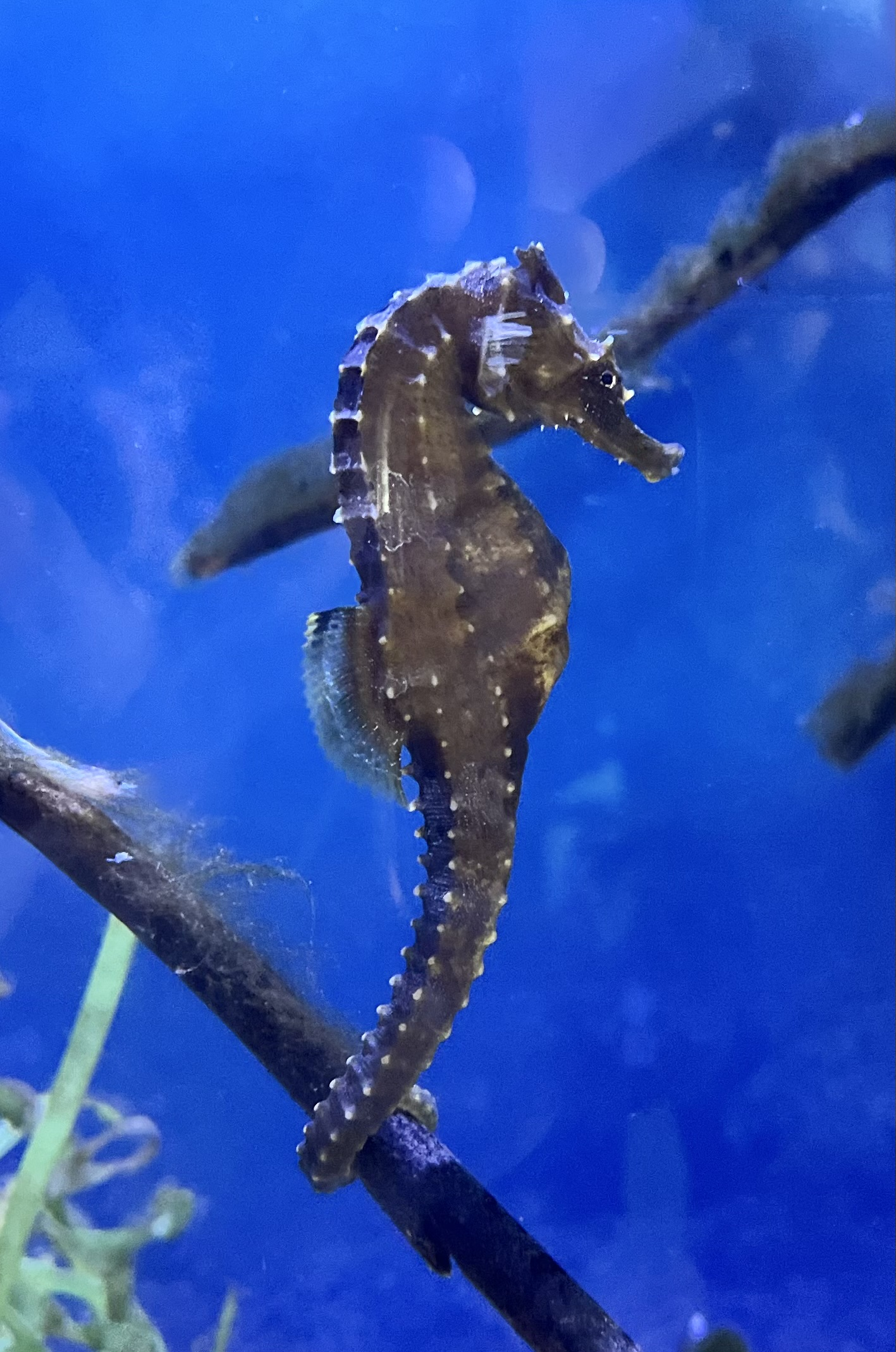
Seahorse

== Awards and recognition ==
- Spring 2025 Readers voted Birch Aquarium as Newsweek Magazine's Readers Choice for Fourth Best Aquarium in the US for 2025.
- Winter 2025 Birch Aquarium listed as one of the 16 Best Aquariums in the United States by US News & World Report.
- Summer 2014 San Diegans vote Birch Aquarium at Scripps the Best Museum in San Diego in the annual A-List poll for the fourth year in a row.
- Summer 2013 San Diegans vote Birch Aquarium at Scripps the Best Museum in San Diego in the annual A-List poll for the third year in a row.
- Summer 2012 San Diegans vote Birch Aquarium at Scripps the Best Museum in San Diego in the annual A-List poll for the second year in a row.
- Fall 2011 San Diegans vote Birch Aquarium at Scripps the Best Museum in San Diego in the annual 10News.com A-List poll. The aquarium was voted the #2 museum in 2008, 2009, and 2010.
