= La Jolla Concours d'Elegance =

- Status: Active
- Genre: Concours d'Elegance
- Date(s): Annually in April
- Frequency: Annual
- Venue: La Jolla Cove, Ellen Browning Scripps Park
- Location(s): La Jolla, San Diego, California, US
- Years active: 2004–present
- Organized by: La Jolla Historical Society
- Sponsor: LPL Financial, Sotheby's International Realty
- Website: Official website

The La Jolla Concours d'Elegance is a Concours d'Elegance event held annually in April on the La Jolla Cove beachfront in La Jolla, a community of San Diego, California. It is hosted by the La Jolla Historical Society.

== History ==
In 2004 the event started as the La Jolla Motor Car Classic that included hot rods and antiques all from the local community. The next year the committee expanded by partnering with known Southern California car enthusiasts to help expand it to the more prestigious concours audience. By 2005 the event was expanded to a full weekend, containing the La Jolla Motor Classic Car Tour that has many of the competition automobiles driving along the La Jolla coast, a black-tie cocktail party for competitors and attendees, and the finale car show on Sunday.

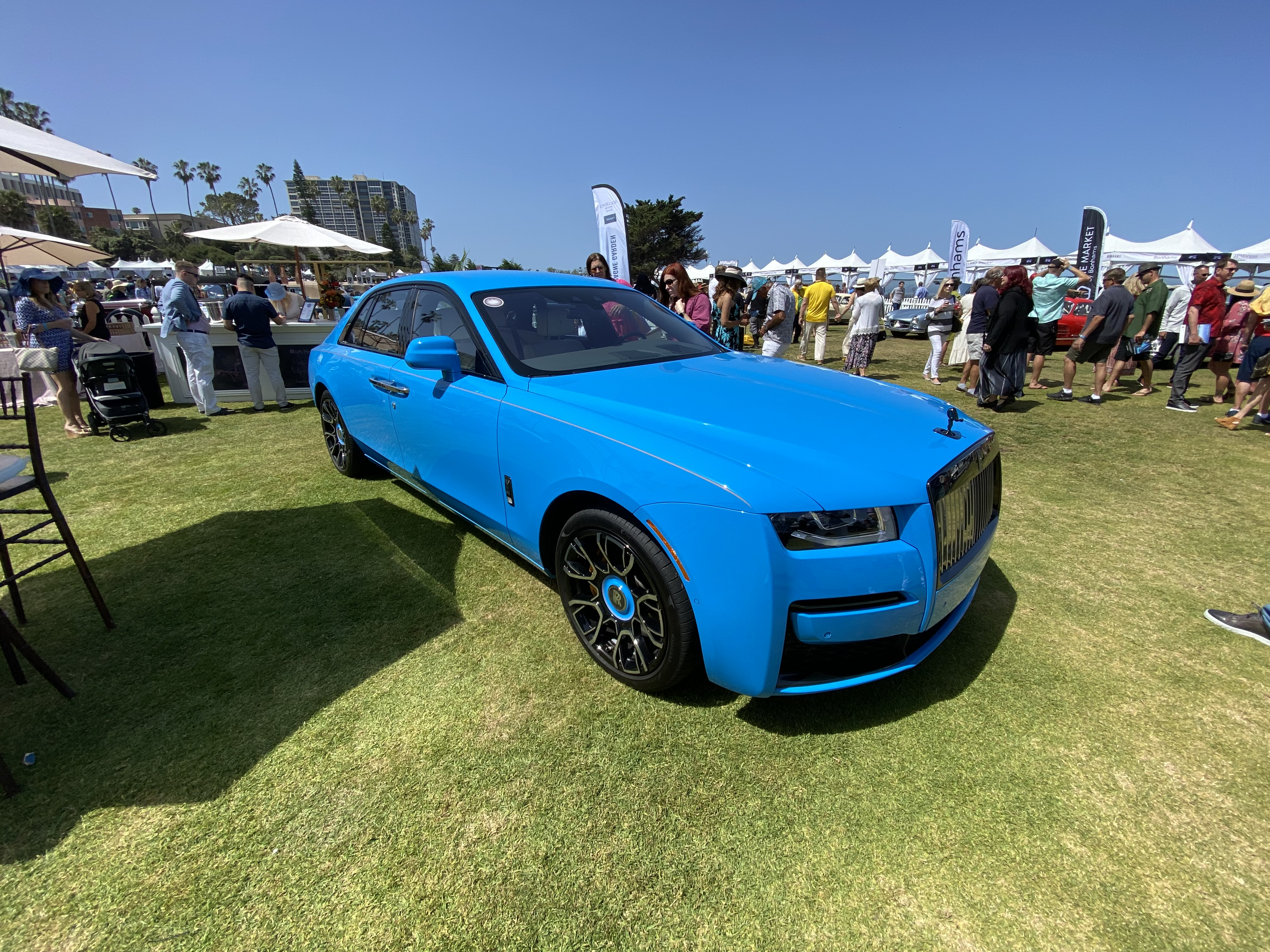
Rolls-Royce Ghost at the 2022 event

In 2009 the committee turned the event's ownership over to the La Jolla Historical Society.

In 2011 the event was officially renamed to the La Jolla Concours d'Elegance and debuted with over 125 automobiles.

In 2015 the competition was restructured with one overall Best of Show winner instead of a pre and post-war Best of Show.

The 2020 and 2021 events were cancelled due to the COVID-19 pandemic.

The 2022 the event featured several live air shows with vintage aircraft alongside the concours and was sponsored by LPL Financial and Pacific Sotheby's.

The 2025 event had a theme of "Mascots in Motion", honoring the artistry of hood ornaments and the legacy of automotive marques.

== Best of Show winners ==
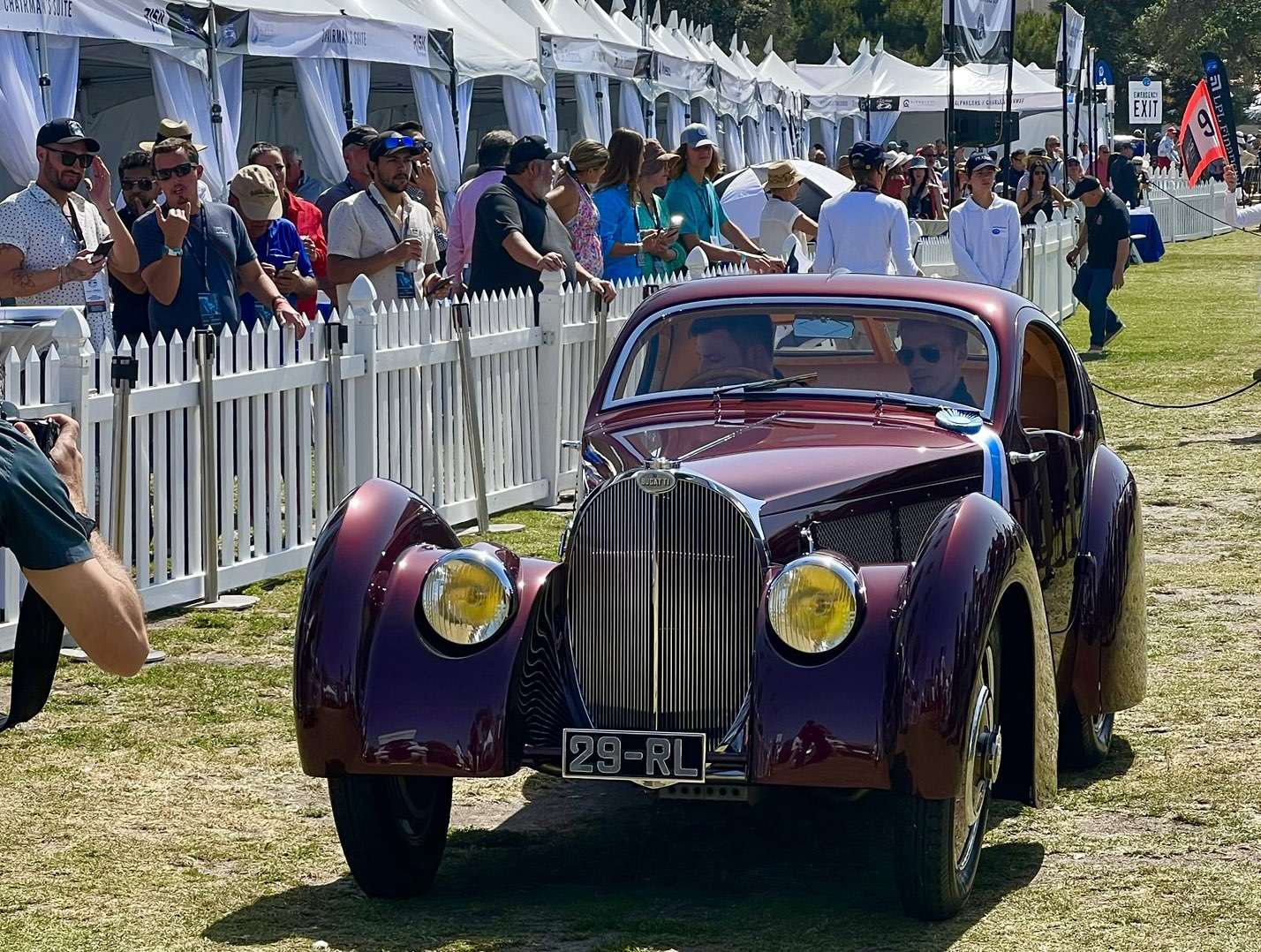
2022 Best of Show - 1931 Bugatti Type 51 Dubos

Year	Winner	Vehicle
2025	John and Kimberly Word	1955 Mercedes-Benz 300 SL Gullwing
2024	William Lyon family	1934 Packard Twelve
2023	William Lyon family	1931 Duesenberg J TaperTail Speedster
2022	Nethercutt Collection (Cameron & Carson Richards)	1931 Bugatti Type 51 Dubos
2019	William Lyon	1935 Duesenberg SJ Gurney Nutting
2018	Mullin Automotive Museum (Peter & Merle Mullin)	1939 Bugatti Type 57SC Aravis Cabriolet
2017	Ron & Sandy Hansen	1921 Duesenberg A Dual Cowl Phaeton
2016	Ken & Ann Smith	1936 Delahaye
2015	Mullin Automotive Museum (Peter & Merle Mullin)	1937 Peugeot Darl'mat

=== Other winners ===
Year	Pre-war Winner	Pre-war Vehicle	Post-war Winner	Post-war Vehicle
2014	Paul Emple	1937 Bugatti Type 57 Cabriolet	Russell & Elena Hook	1954 Mercedes-Benz 300 SL Gullwing
2013	Richard Adams	1930 Bugatti Type 46 Petit Royale Faux Cabriolet	Petersen Automotive Museum	1953 Cadillac Series 62 Ghia
