= La Jolla Historical Society =

Coordinates: 32°50′42″N 117°16′38″W

The La Jolla Historical Society, officially the Museum of History and Culture La Jolla, is a private 501(c)(3) nonprofit organization in the La Jolla community of San Diego, California, dedicated to promote the history and culture of the region's coastline.

== Programs and collections ==
A unique historic house museum, the La Jolla Historical Society (LJHS) "develops projects that cross disciplinary boundaries and explore the relationship of culture to society, collaborating with guest curators, artists, architects, and other cultural producers." Programs include exhibitions, presentations, symposia, discussions, interviews, architecture tours, youth education, and annual community events such as the Secret Garden Tour of La Jolla and the La Jolla Concours d'Elegance. LJHS consults with the City of San Diego regarding landmark designations of properties located in La Jolla.

The Online Archive of California lists some, but not all, of the collections held by the La Jolla Historical Society.

== Location ==
The La Jolla Historical Society is located in the former property of Virginia Scripps, half-sister of philanthropist Ellen Browning Scripps.

== Organizational history ==
The La Jolla Historical Society (LJHS) was founded in 1964 by a group of community leaders and local citizens dedicated to preserving the community’s rich heritage and culture.

The work of LJHS dates back to 1936 with the arrival in La Jolla of Howard S.F. Randolph, a historian and genealogist from New England. Interested in La Jolla's early development, Randolph worked with the Library Association of La Jolla, now the Athenaeum Music & Arts Library, to gather photographs and other documentation. The publication of his book La Jolla: Year by Year (1946), spurred interest in local history. Randolph’s collection grew, becoming the nucleus of the significant archival collection of images and documents that LJHS maintains today. La Jollans’ historical efforts remained connected to the Library Association through the 1950s.

The 1960s were a decade of dramatic change in La Jolla as a "land boom" led to rapidly increasing real estate prices. Small beach cottages began to be demolished and replaced by high rises and modern commercial buildings. The arrival of the University of California, San Diego, and Salk Institute for Biological Studies changed the cultural and intellectual composition of the community.

In that context, community members realized a separate organization was necessary to address a growing interest in history and preservation. Articles of incorporation were filed on July 7, 1964, with the Society's first officers being Barbara Dawson (President), Hiomi Nakamura (Vice President), and A.B. Crosby (Secretary). At that time, the board of trustees of the Library Association transferred the substantial Randolph Collection to LJHS.

LJHS first occupied a room in the La Jolla Federal Savings & Loan building at 1100 Wall Street. It then met in private homes until 1968 when a small office was established at 7917 Girard Avenue. In 1971, operations were moved to the La Jolla Public Library at 1010 Wall St. (now the Athenaeum Music & Arts Library). Six years later, the Society moved to the Colonial Inn. In 1981, LJHS moved to its current location in the La Jolla Cultural District.

The La Jolla Historical Society now exists as a growing community organization, adding on more programs as the society expands.

== Historic Structures ==
=== 1904 Wisteria Cottage and Balmer Annex ===
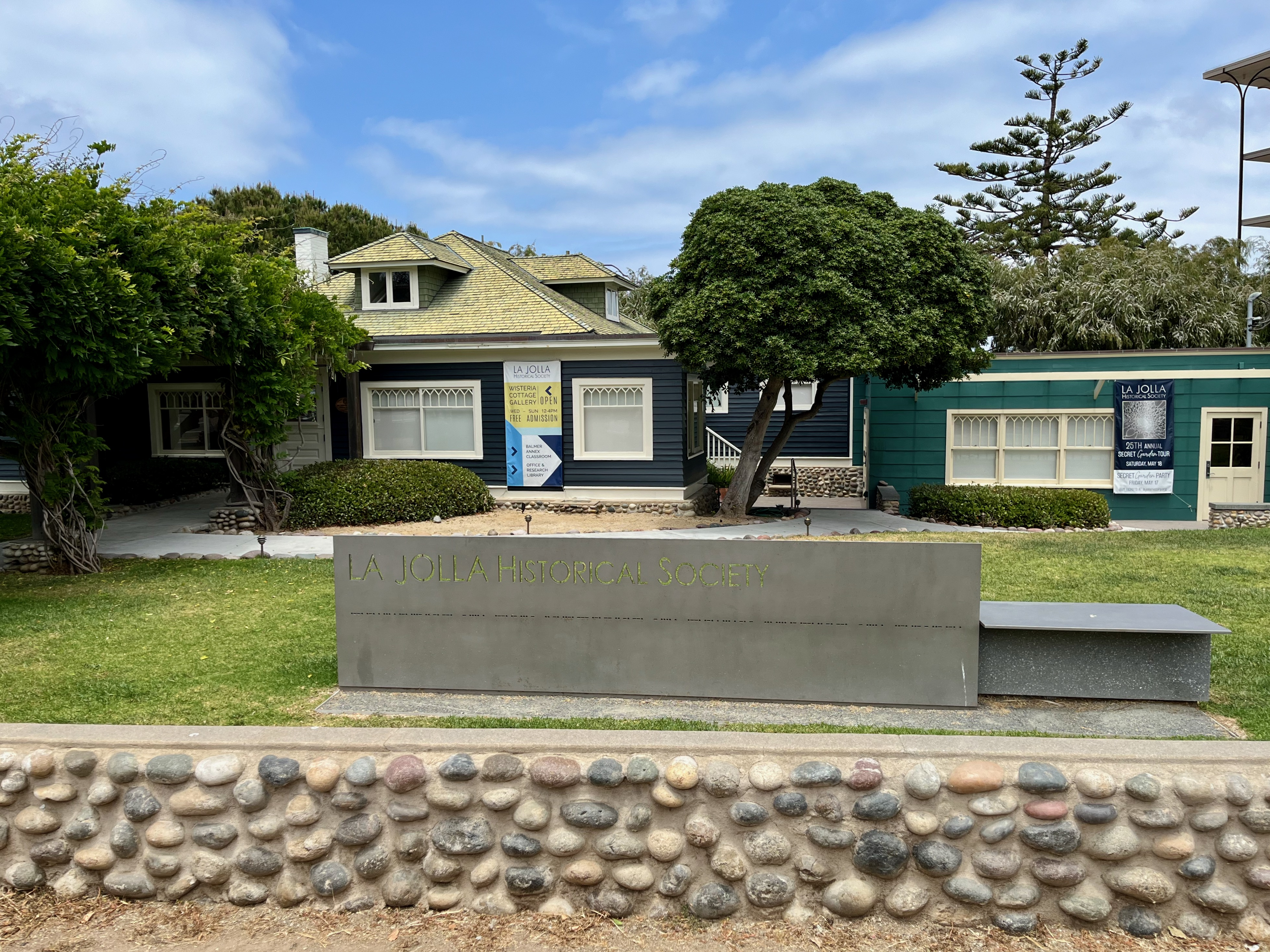
Wisteria Cottage (left) and Balmer Cottage (right), La Jolla Historical Society

Wisteria Cottage, 780 Prospect Street, is located in the heart of the La Jolla Cultural District and offers an important example of the distinctive vernacular architecture of early San Diego. The rehabilitated Wisteria Cottage serves as an interpretative space and a museum-standard exhibition gallery space. The renovated conference room in the Balmer Annex provides improved facilities for meetings, workshops, educational programs, and community activities.

Wisteria Cottage was built in 1904 and acquired by Virginia Scripps, half-sister of philanthropist Ellen Browning Scripps, soon after its completion. Between 1907 and 1909, architect Irving J. Gill made a number of additions and modifications, including the construction of a wisteria-covered pergola that flanks the entry. Wisteria Cottage became part of a Scripps family compound that, by 1916, included South Molton Villa and several smaller buildings: a library, a guest bungalow, a lathe house, and a garage.

From the 1940s through the 1960s, Wisteria Cottage housed the Balmer School, an elementary school that developed into La Jolla Country Day School. Balmer Annex was added in the late 1940s. From the mid-1960s to 2005, it served as a bookshop, first the Nexxus Bookstore, then John Cole's Book Shop. The Cottage was added to the List of San Diego Historic Landmarks in 1982 (HRBS 166).

With the closing of Cole's Bookstore in 2005, Wisteria Cottage began a new era as the home of the La Jolla Historical Society. In 2008, Ellen Clark Revelle, the great-niece of Ellen Browning Scripps, and her family made a bequest of the entire property to LJHS. Pat Dahlberg, president and executive director of LJHS, played a major role in securing the site.

Wisteria Cottage was restored and rehabilitated for use as a museum, education and research center, and community gathering place. Construction was completed in 2014 to coincide with LJHS's 50th Anniversary celebration.

In 2014, the Historical Resources Board (HRB) of the City of San Diego presented LJHS with an award for the Architectural Rehabilitation of Wisteria Cottage. LJHS was also selected for Save Our Heritage Organisation's People in Preservation Awards program as 2014 Preservationists of the Year.

=== 1909 Cottage ===
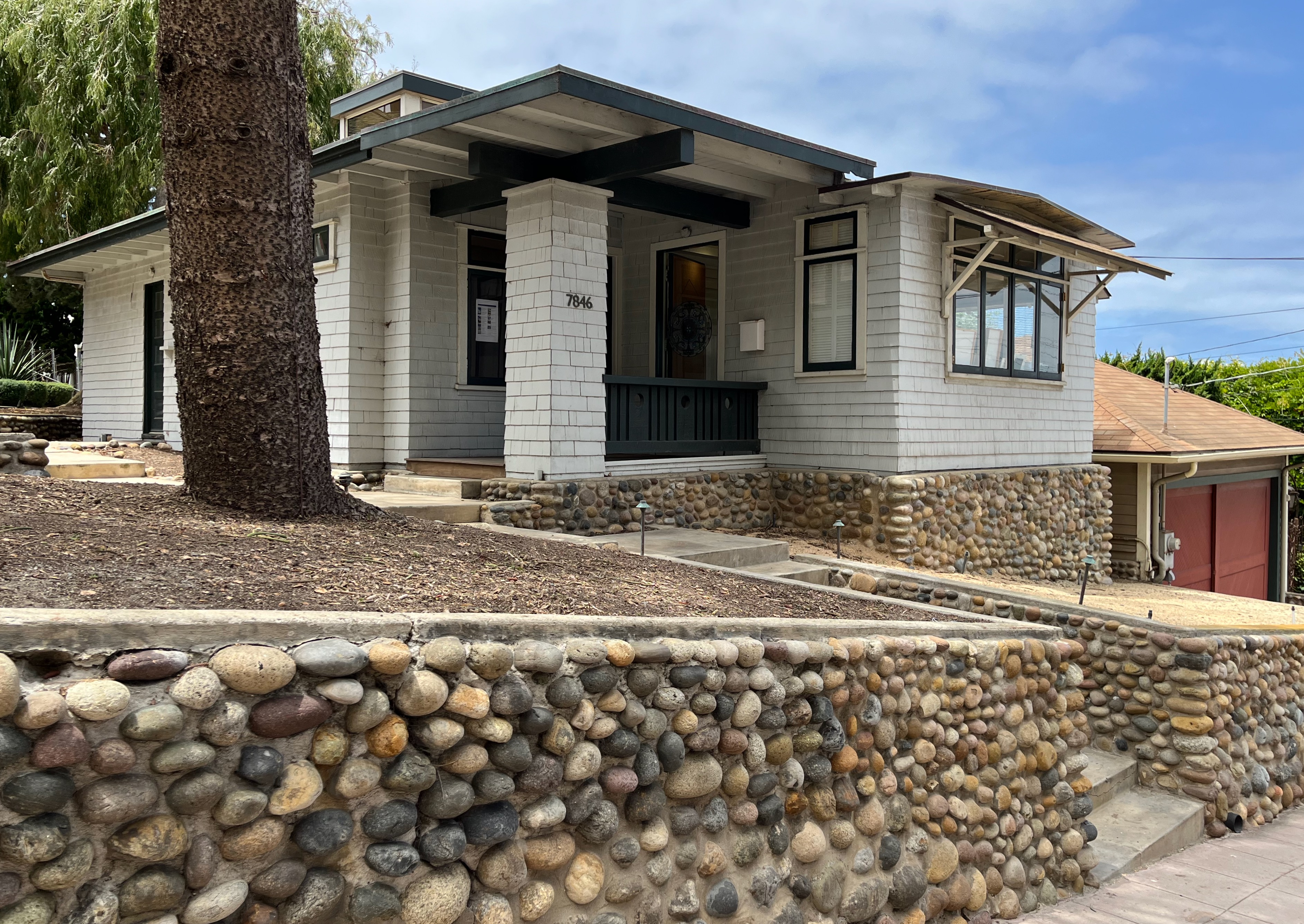
1909 Cottage, La Jolla Historical Society

The 1909 Cottage has been adaptively reused as offices and public research space. The rooms have their original wainscot, windows with “wavy” glass, and pine plank floors.

The cottage, originally located at 245 Prospect Street, was one of many seasonal houses built in La Jolla. Often constructed from old-growth redwood, they had one or two bedrooms and no plumbing or electricity.

LJHS acquired the cottage in 1981, after learning that it was due to be demolished to make room for a three-story condominium. The cottage was moved to its current location at 7846 Eads Avenue by La Jolla developer Dewhurst & Associates, with the financial support of the Revelle Family.

=== 1917 Carriage House ===
The Carriage House has been retrofitted for state-of-the-art storage of the Society’s archival collection, which includes historic photographs, public records, private documents, and newspaper archives.

Located on the former estate of philanthropist Ellen Browning Scripps, the Carriage House was built in 1917 as a garage for the Ford automobile belonging to Scripps' chauffeur.

=== 1996 Venturi Pergola ===
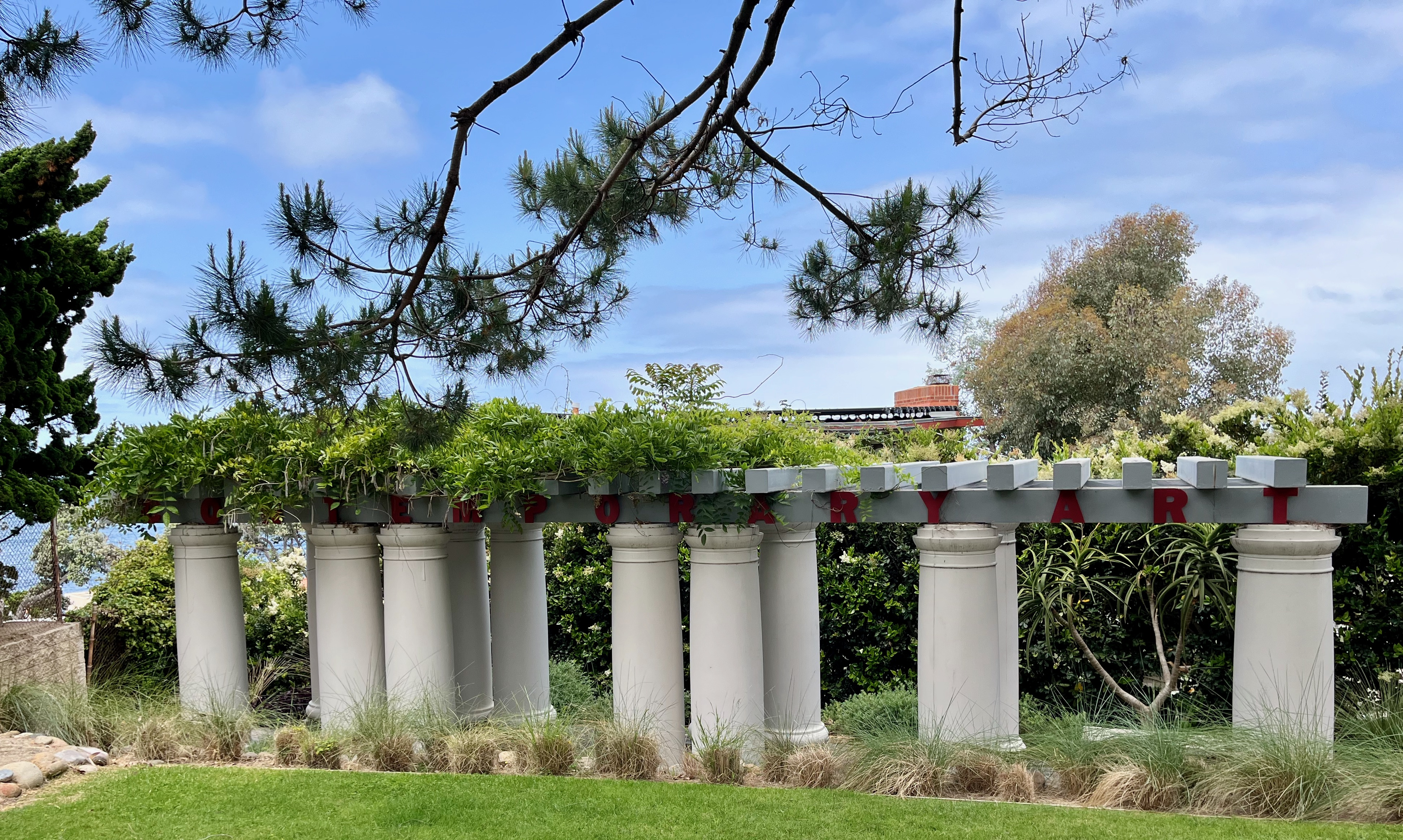
Venturi Pergola, La Jolla Historical Society

In 2018, LJHS acquired and installed The Venturi Pergola, one of the pergolas designed for the Museum of Contemporary Art San Diego (MCASD) complex by the firm of Venturi, Scott Brown and Associates (VSBA). The Tuscan-inspired fiberglass columns and aluminum pergola were a postmodern response to the work of early twentieth-century architect Irving J. Gill. The pergola was accessioned into LJHS’s permanent collection.

== Online Exhibits ==
- Google Arts & Culture: La Jolla's Coastal Legacy
