= Scripps Pier =

Research pier at the Scripps Institution of Oceanography

Ellen Browning Scripps Memorial Pier
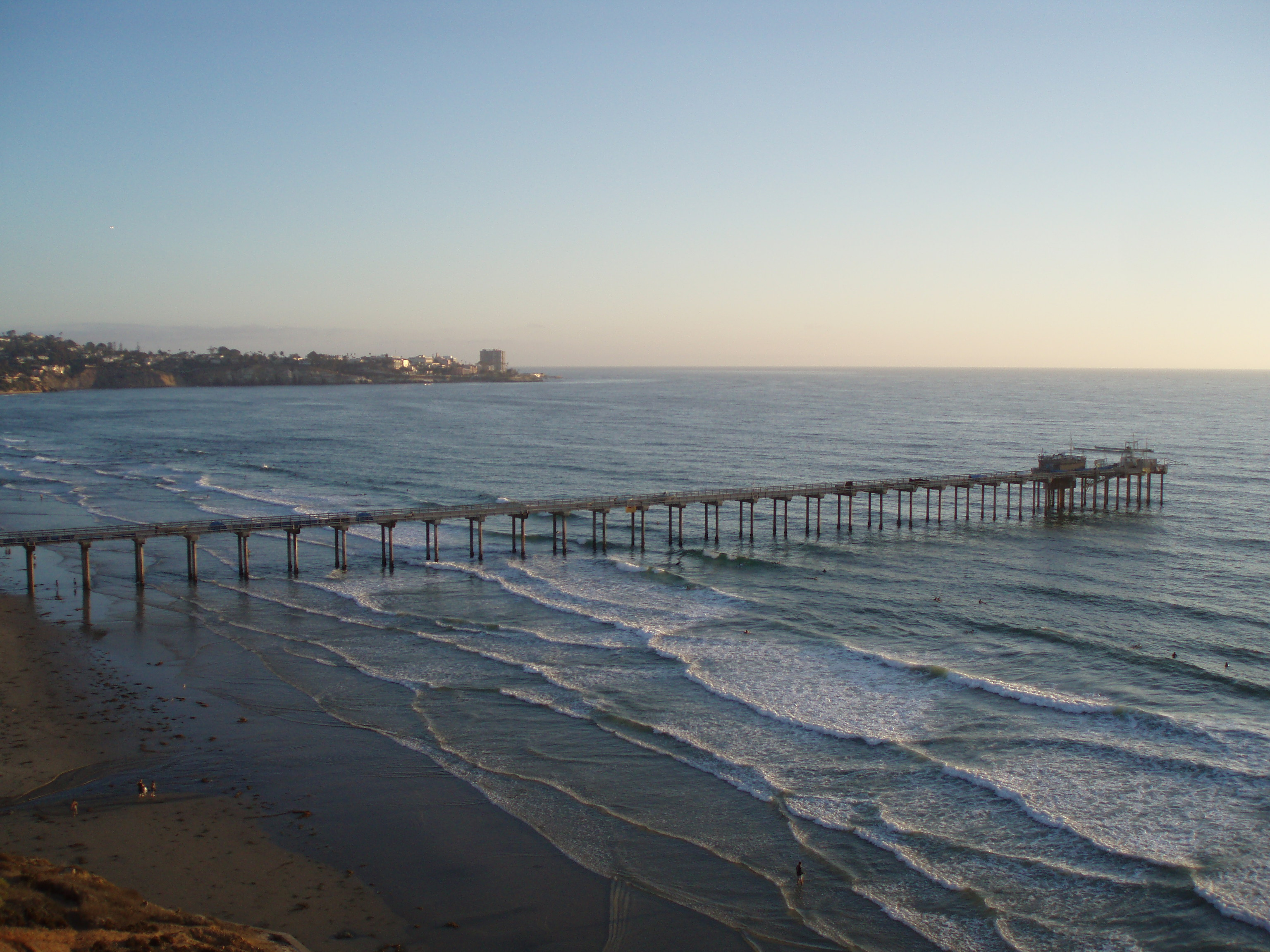
- Scripps Pier with La Jolla Cove in background, taken from the Scripps Institution of Oceanography north campus

General information
- Location: Scripps Institution of Oceanography, 8650 Kennel Way, La Jolla, California
- Coordinates: 32.8670°N 117.2571°W
- Completed: Original: 1916; Modern: 1988
- Client: Scripps Institution of Oceanography; University of California, San Diego

Technical details
- Size: 1,084 feet (length)

Scripps Pier, formally Ellen Browning Scripps Memorial Pier, is a research facility operated by the Scripps Institution of Oceanography, part of the University of California, San Diego in La Jolla, California, United States. At 1,084 feet in length, it is one of the longest research piers in the world. The modern Scripps Pier was completed in 1988, but research activity had been taking place on its predecessor as far back as 1916. It is named after Ellen Browning Scripps.

== Research ==
There are many research activities occurring at Scripps Pier. Some include:

- Shore Stations Program: The pier has stations to measure seawater temperature and salinity, and is part of a greater program coordinated by UC San Diego. Readings have been conducted at Scripps Pier since 1916, and providing one of the world's longest continuous records of ocean conditions.
- Advanced Global Atmospheric Gases Experiment (AGAGE): Sensors at Scripps Pier help measure gases in the atmosphere, particularly those related to climate change.
- Coastal Data Information Program (CDIP): A buoy off Scripps Pier measures wave height, period, water temperature, and other conditions.
- Imagine Flowcytobot (IFCB): IFCB is a submersible flow cytometer that takes images of particles found in the water.
- Long Range High-Frequency Radar: These instruments provide researchers with information on ocean currents.
- NOAA Data Buoy Station LJAC1: One of many stations operated by the National Data Buoy Center, Scripps Pier records data on wind speed, atmospheric pressure, gusts, and temperature. This data is used by many organizations like the National Weather Service, for example.
- Scripps Ocean Acidification Real-Time Monitoring Program: Instruments at Scripps Pier measure pH and temperature in La Jolla waters. This program is one of the only continuous water acidification monitoring sites on the United States West Coast.
- Small Boating Program: Scripps Pier is equipped with a crane to raise and lower boats for diving, specimen collection, and more. It oversees vessels up to 65' long.

== History ==
=== Old Scripps Pier ===
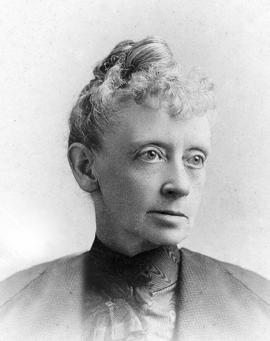
Ellen Browning Scripps

The University of California incorporated the Marine Biological Association of San Diego in 1912, and the association was renamed the Scripps Institution for Biological Research of the University of California (later renamed to Scripps Institution of Oceanography). There was an immediate push by Director William E. Ritter to expand the institution's research facilities, and so a 1,000 foot long pier was planned, 300 feet north of the George H. Scripps building. It could function as a place to launch boats and also act as a platform to get seawater for an aquarium.

Due to lack of funding, the pier was postponed by a few years, until a firm from Los Angeles was selected to take the project. However, due to World War I, the project was delayed even more. A gift by $100,000 Ellen Browning Scripps, of which $34,000 was designated for the pier, helped get the project started. In May 1915, the Mercereau Bridge and Construction Company was awarded the contract. In July 1915, while construction was underway, it was found that the depth of the water and sand was over the estimates, increasing potential costs. The pier was finally completed in 1916 with construction costs finalizing around $36,000.

In August 1916, the Scripps Institution of Oceanography held a ceremony to celebrate the construction of many new buildings and the pier. Invited speakers included Benjamin Ide Wheeler. A relative of biologist Francis Bertody Sumner wrote that picnics were held on the pier, and people played games like potato races and three-legged races.

Once completed, researchers began monitoring weather, sea, and surface data. This daily sampling at Scripps Pier is conducted to this day. At first, temperature and salinity measurements were limited to surface samples, but in 1926, researchers started conducting bottom sample measurements as well. Seawater from Scripps Pier was also supplied to many facilities at the institution such as the aquarium. Until 1941, people were allowed to fish from Scripps Pier for 25 cents a day. They could also get a lifetime permit for $20. The first curator of the aquarium even fished and set up traps at the pier to collect fish for the aquarium.

Heavy storms damaged the pier and in 1946, it was rebuilt at a cost of $65,000. In 1982, a series of storms caused 105 of the pier's pilings to be damaged. Plans were made to construct a new, larger, and all-concrete pier to replace it.

=== Modern Scripps Pier ===
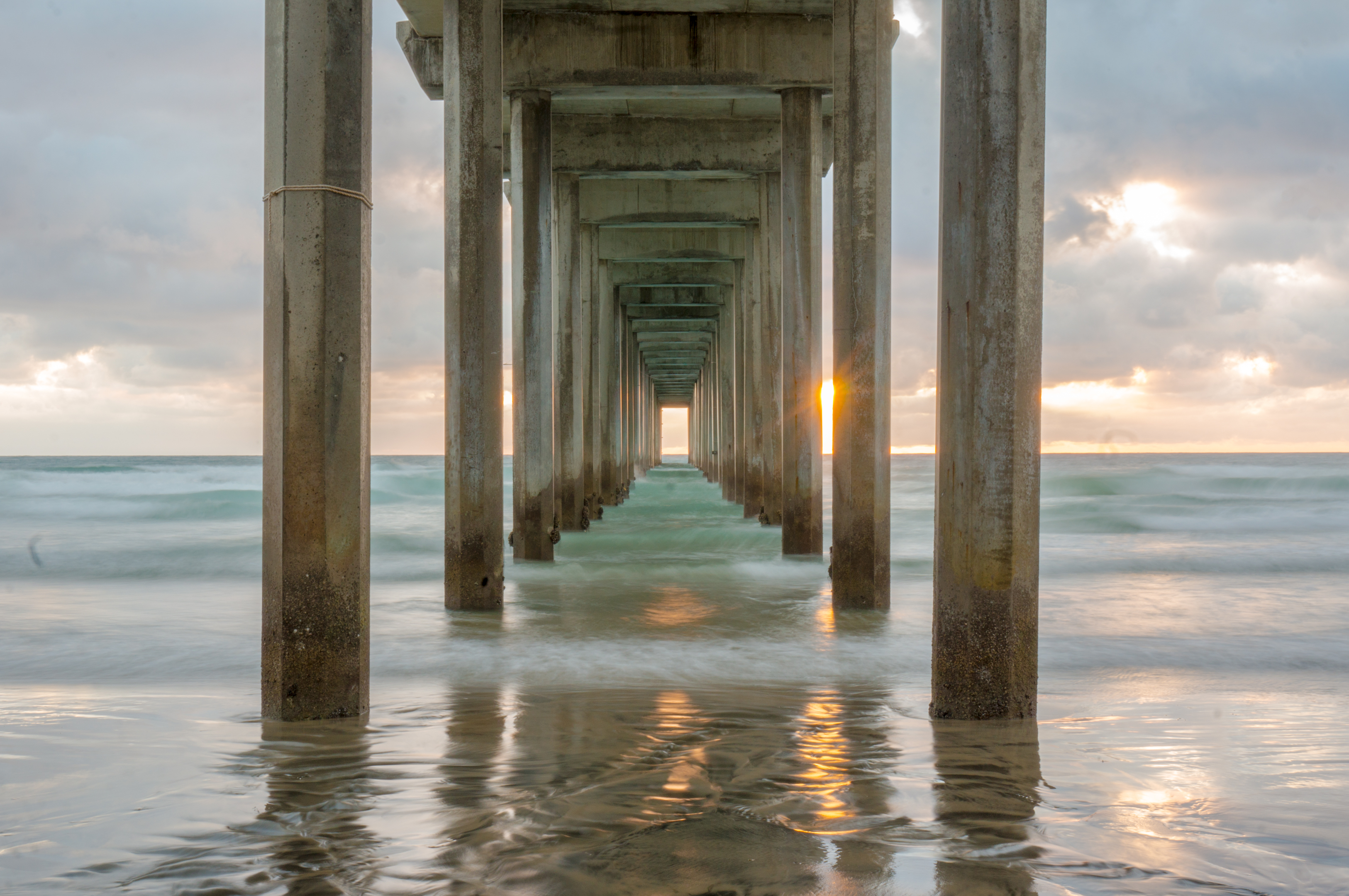
Underneath Scripps Pier

Funding for the new Scripps Pier was sought from the state of California. It is this new pier that was named after Ellen Browning Scripps. It was constructed adjacent to the old pier and completed in 1988. The old pier was then torn down. The pier is still supported by funding from the Scripps family to this day. The pier is currently not open to the public and is generally restricted to researchers, but it does offer historical tours and educational tours.

To this day, seawater is pumped up from the pier, which supplies seawater to the Scripps Institution of Oceanography's labs and aquariums, like the Birch Aquarium. It pumps up to 1.8 million gallons of seawater each day.

Two cameras mounted on top of the pier provide realtime views of the nearby La Jolla Shores beach surfline and a third "osprey cam" displays a nesting platform intended for the ospreys that frequent the area. Mounted on a pier piling about 4 meters under the surface, the Coastal Ocean Observing Lab's Scripps Pier Live Cam streams a view of the environment under the pier.
