= Ellen Browning Scripps =

American journalist and philanthropist (1836–1932)

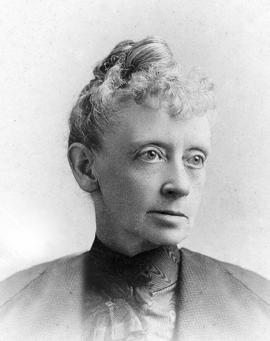
- Ellen Browning Scripps, 1891
- Born: October 18, 1836; London, England
- Died: August 3, 1932 (aged 95); San Diego, California, U.S.
- Education: Knox College
- Known for: Philanthropy, Journalism
- Parent(s): James Mogg Scripps; Ellen Mary Saunders
- Relatives: James E. Scripps, (1835–1906; brother); Julia Anne Scripps, (1847-1898; sister); E. W. Scripps, (1854–1926; half-brother)

Ellen Browning Scripps (October 18, 1836 – August 3, 1932) was an American journalist and philanthropist who was the founding donor of several major institutions in Southern California. She and her half-brother E.W. Scripps created the E.W. Scripps Company, America's largest chain of newspapers, linking Midwestern industrial cities with booming towns in the West. By the 1920s, Ellen Browning Scripps was worth an estimated $30 million ($3 billion in 2024 dollars), most of which she donated.

She appeared on the cover of Time magazine after founding Scripps College in Claremont, California. She also donated millions of dollars to organizations worldwide that promised to advance democratic principles and women's education.

She helped to found Scripps Institution of Oceanography, Scripps Research, and Scripps Health, all located in the La Jolla neighborhood of San Diego, California. The Scripps family supports the Scripps National Spelling Bee.

== Family history ==
Ellen Browning Scripps was born on October 18, 1836, on South Molton St. in St. George Parish, London. Her father, James Mogg Scripps (1803–1873), was the youngest of six children born to London publisher William Armiger Scripps (1772–1851) and Mary Dixie (1771–1838). He was apprenticed to Charles Lewis, the leading bookbinder of London, where he learned the trade. James married his cousin Elizabeth Sabey in 1829, and they had two children; only one of them lived to maturity, Elizabeth Mary (1831–1914), and Elizabeth Sabey Scripps died the day after the latter's birth. Two years later, James Mogg married Ellen Mary Saunders; they had six children, five of whom lived to adulthood: James E. Scripps (1835–1906), Ellen Browning (1836–1932), William Arminger (1838–1914), George Henry (1839–1900) and John Mogg (1840–1863). Ellen Mary Scripps died of breast cancer in 1841.

After the failure of his bookbinding shop and the death of his second wife, James Mogg emigrated to the United States with his six children in April 1844. They headed to Rushville, Illinois, where other members of the Scripps family owned property. James Mogg married his third wife Julia Osborn in November 1844; they had five children: Julia Anne (1847–1898), Thomas Osborn (1848–53), Frederick Tudor (1850–1936), Eliza Virginia (1852–1921), and Edward Willis (1854–1926), the well-known newspaper tycoon and founder of The E.W. Scripps Company.

== Biography ==
=== Early life ===
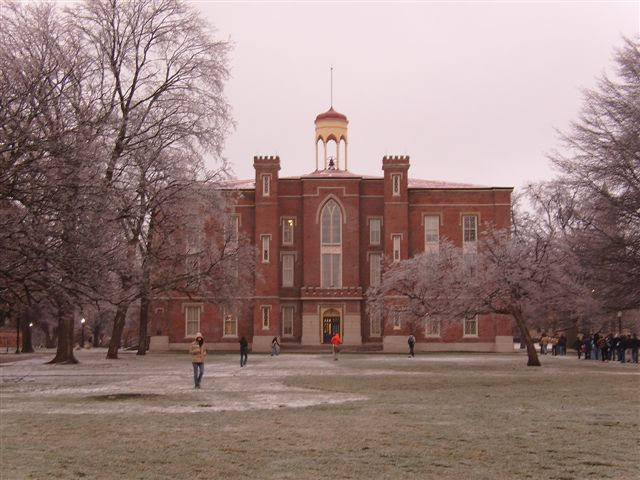
Old Main Knox College

Born in London and raised in Rushville, Illinois, Ellen Browning Scripps was an avid reader and learner at an early age. In 1855, a year before attending college, she was granted a teaching certificate and started teaching in Schuyler County, IL. She was the only one of her ten siblings to attend college, studying science and mathematics at Knox College in Galesburg, IL, one of the few educational institutions to admit women. She graduated in 1859 with a certificate from the Female Collegiate Department and honors in mathematics. Afterwards, she returned to Rushville, Illinois, to teach in a one-room schoolhouse.

=== Newspaper journalist ===
After the American Civil War, Scripps gave up her job as a schoolteacher and headed to Detroit, at that time a booming industrial center in the West. She joined her brother James E. Scripps in publishing The Detroit Evening News, a short, inexpensive, and politically independent newspaper pitched to the city's working class. This was to be the start of the Scripps family fortune.

Scripps worked as a copyeditor and wrote a daily column, nicknamed "Miss Ellen's Miscellany", that reduced local and national news to short sound bites. According to Gerald Baldasty, "Her columns of "Miscellany" and other topics became the inspiration for the Newspaper Enterprise Association, a news features service that Edward Scripps established in 1902." In the 1870s and 1880s, the Scripps papers expanded to include The Cleveland Press, The Cincinnati Post, and the St. Louis Chronicle.

A shareholder, Ellen B. Scripps played an important role in Scripps councils. She gave business advice to her younger half-brother E.W. and sided with him in family financial disputes. He credited her with saving him from financial ruin in more than one instance. In the 1880s, E.W.'s attempt to seize control of the Scripps Publishing Company failed, resulting in a divisive lawsuit and a break with his half-brother James.

=== Travels ===
In 1881, Ellen and E.W. travelled to Europe so that the latter could take a break from work and recover his health. They took the railroad through France to the Mediterranean Sea, crossed by ship to Algeria, then headed north into Italy, Austria, and Germany. Ellen wrote weekly letters back to The Detroit Evening News about their travels, describing her impressions of people and places. When Ellen returned to her job at the News, she found that she was no longer needed at the copy desk. She began a decade of travel, heading to the American South, New England, Cuba, and Mexico. In 1888–1889 she made a second trip to Europe that included a visit to L'Exposition Universelle in Paris and three months in Spain. A decade later, she toured France, Belgium, and England.

=== California ===
In 1887, Ellen's sister Julia Anne moved to Alameda, California, to seek a remedy for crippling rheumatoid arthritis. She found a home at the Remedial Institute and School of Philosophy, also known as the New Order of Life, in Alameda, one of the many utopian communities founded in the late nineteenth century. Concerned about her sister's welfare, Ellen made her first trip to California in the winter of 1890. Soon afterwards, Ellen and E.W. bought land in San Diego and established Miramar Ranch, which would become the Scripps family home, with their brother Fred. Miramar Ranch encompassed what is now Scripps Ranch, a suburban community, and the Marine Corps Air Station Miramar. Ellen Browning Scripps lived at Miramar Ranch with the Scripps family until 1897, when she moved to her home in La Jolla. The ranch house was torn down in 1973.

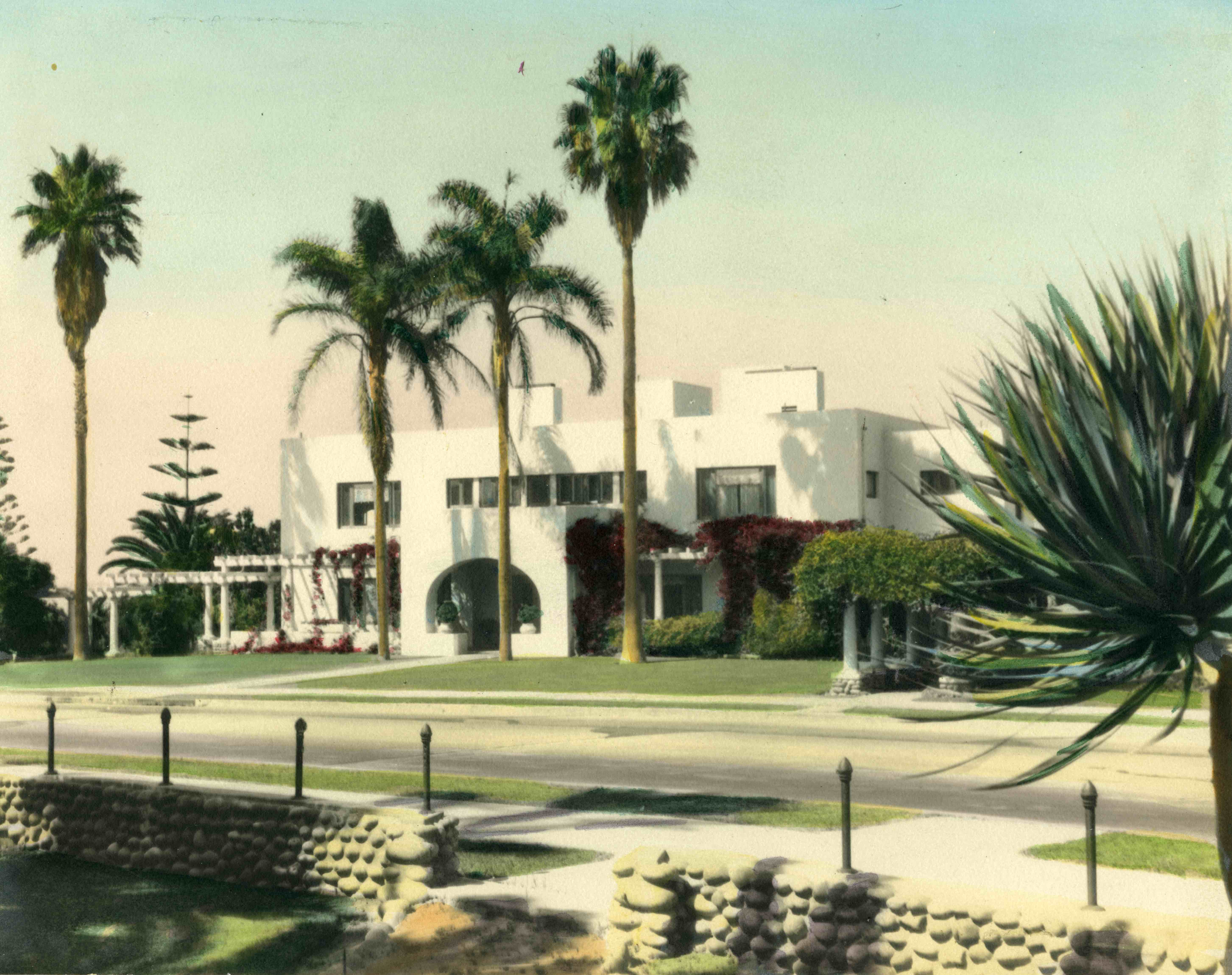
Ellen Browning Scripps's house, South Molton Villa II, designed by architect Irving J. Gill

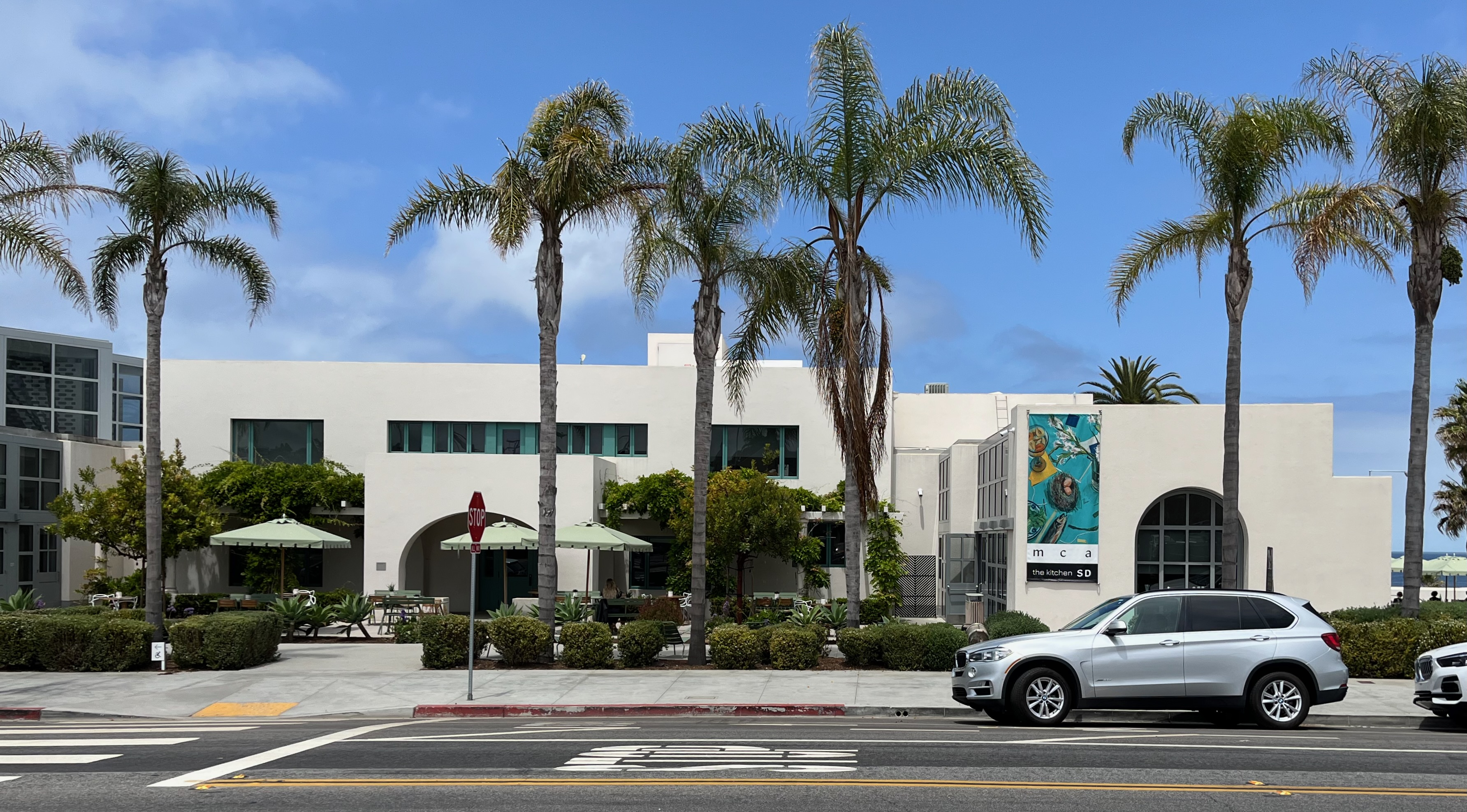
Museum of Contemporary Art San Diego, 2024, former house of Ellen Browning Scripps

In 1897 Scripps moved to the seaside village of La Jolla where she built a modest house named South Molton Villa after the street in London on which she had been born. When the house burned down in 1915, Scripps commissioned architect Irving J. Gill to redesign a new, fireproof concrete structure in the same modern architectural language as The Bishop's School, the La Jolla Woman's Club, and the La Jolla Recreational Center. It has been described as one of Gill's "masterworks". Her house is now the Museum of Contemporary Art San Diego. Over the next three decades, she and her half-sister Virginia created a Scripps family compound that included extensive gardens, Wisteria Cottage (now the La Jolla Historical Society), a library, a guest bungalow, a lathe house, and two garages.

In La Jolla, Ellen gradually stepped out of her intimate family circle and began to acquire a large set of female acquaintances. La Jolla had a growing number of summer and year-round residents, many of whom were unmarried women or widows. She remarked that in the early days, "It was a woman's town." She was a founding member of the La Jolla Library Association and the La Jolla Woman's Club, among other organizations.

=== Wealth ===
Ellen Browning Scripps made a fortune by investing in E.W. Scripps's growing chain of newspapers in the West. In 1894, E.W. formed a partnership with Milton A. McRae, who had risen through the ranks to become one of Scripps's top lieutenants. George H. Scripps joined the partnership in 1895. The group managed The Cincinnati Post, The Cleveland Press, The St. Louis Chronicle, The Toledo News-Bee, and the Kansas City Star. They also acquired newspapers in Memphis, Oklahoma City, Evansville, Terre Haute, Columbus, Denver, Dallas, and Houston.

In the late 1890s, E.W. began to acquire papers in California, including The Los Angeles Record, The San Diego Sun, and The San Francisco News. In the Pacific Northwest, the growing profitability of working-class newspapers led to the development of The Seattle Star, The Spokane Press, The Tacoma Times, and The Portland News, all pitched to dock workers, miners, lumbermen, and cannery workers. By 1905, E.W. estimated that profits on "my little Western papers" were many times greater than those of his Eastern ones.

Ellen Scripps gained a substantial legacy from her brother George H. Scripps who died in 1900, leaving behind a will described as "a legacy of hate". He gave his shares of Evening News stock to E.W., whom James E. Scripps considered his nemesis. Ellen, meanwhile, received George's shares of the Scripps Publishing Co. This led to an eleven-year legal battle that E.W. and Ellen ultimately won.

=== Philanthropy ===
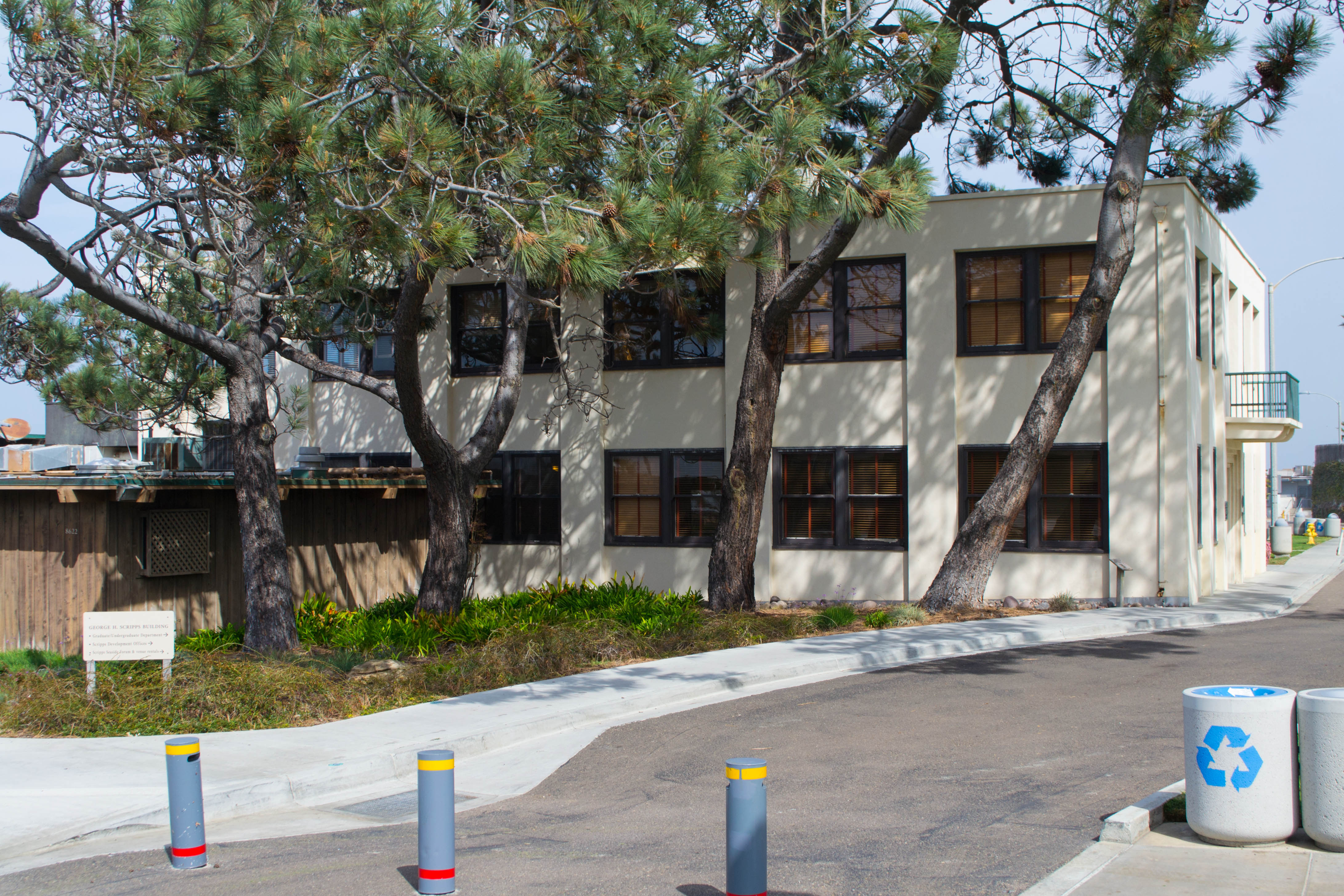
George H. Scripps Memorial Marine Biological Laboratory, Scripps Institution of Oceanography

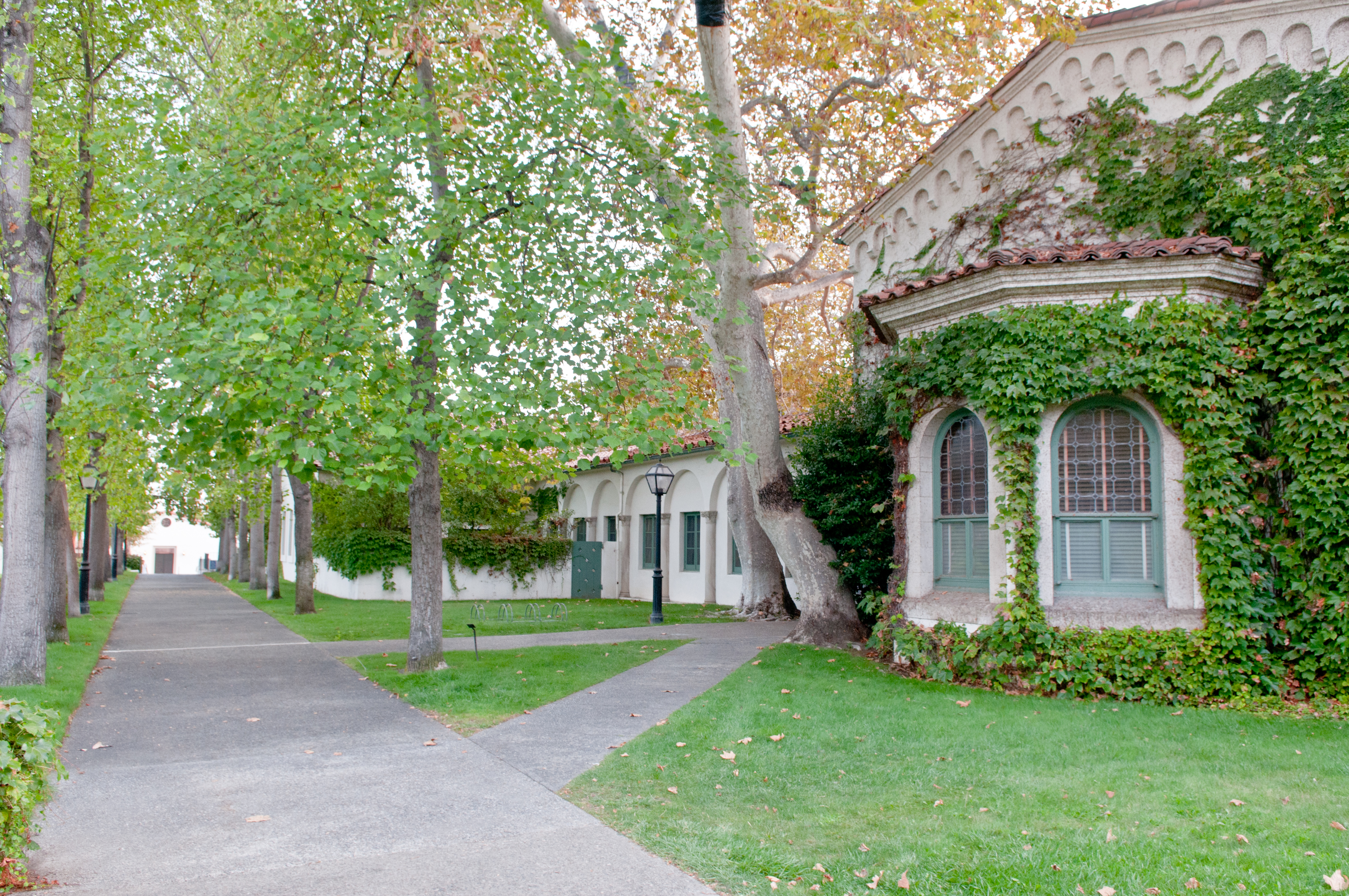
Scripps College, Claremont, CA

Interested in science and education, Ellen Browning Scripps donated the bulk of her fortune to the Scripps Institution of Oceanography (1903), The Bishop's School (1909), and the Scripps College (1929) in Claremont, California.

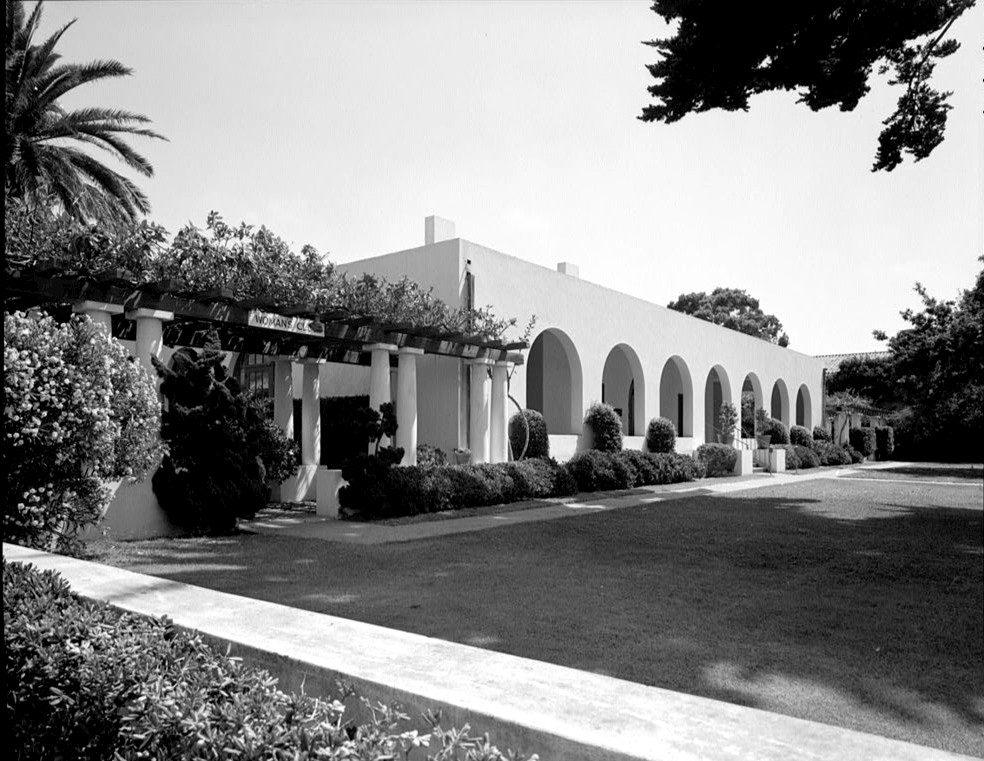
La Jolla Woman's Club

She supported community initiatives such as the La Jolla Women's Club and the La Jolla Recreational Center and contributed financially to improvement projects in the coastal area such as The Children's Pool. La Jolla Park was renamed Ellen Browning Scripps Memorial Park in 1927 to honor her many gifts to La Jolla.

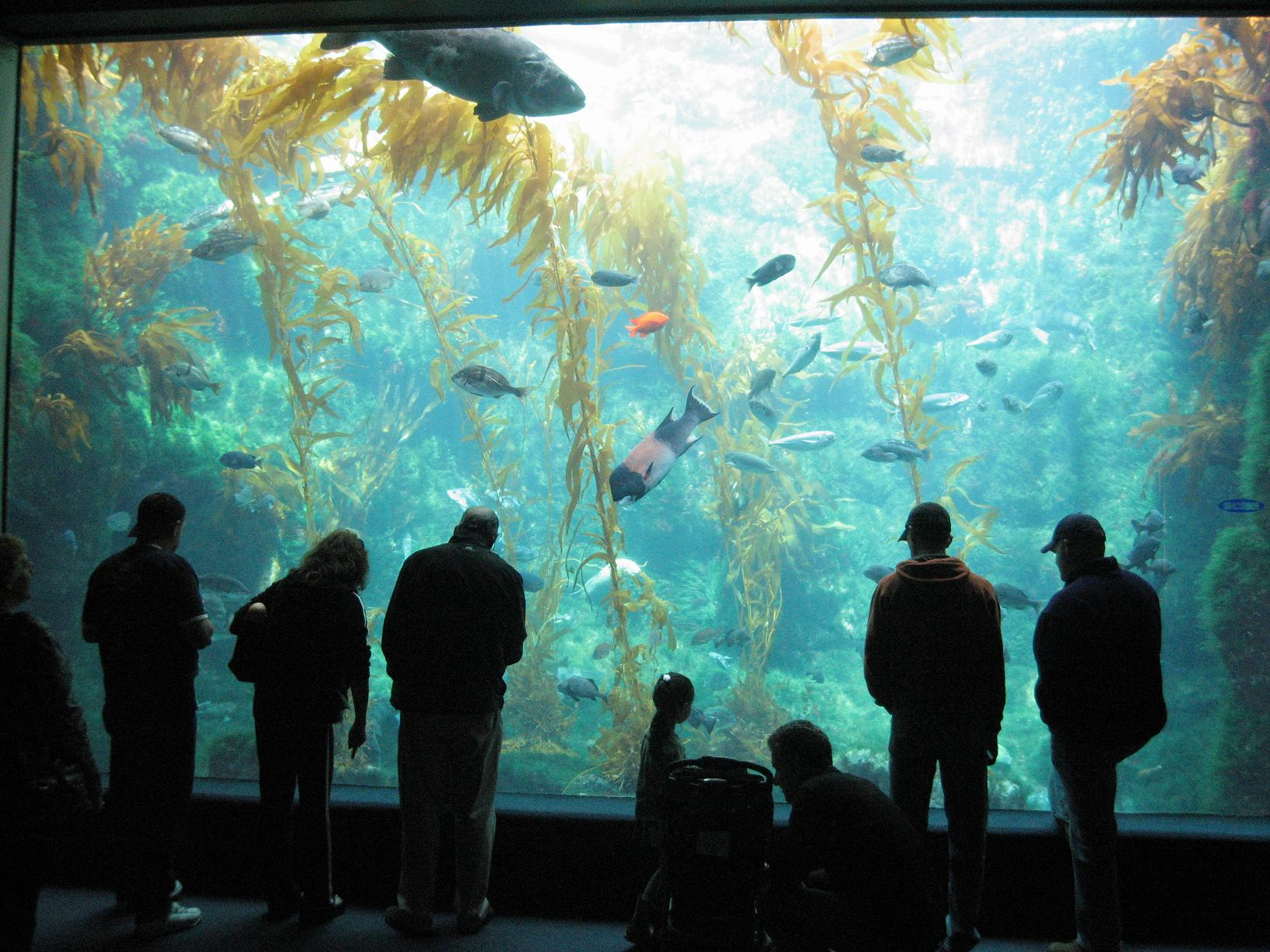
Kelp tank, Birch Aquarium, Scripps Institution of Oceanography, 2007)

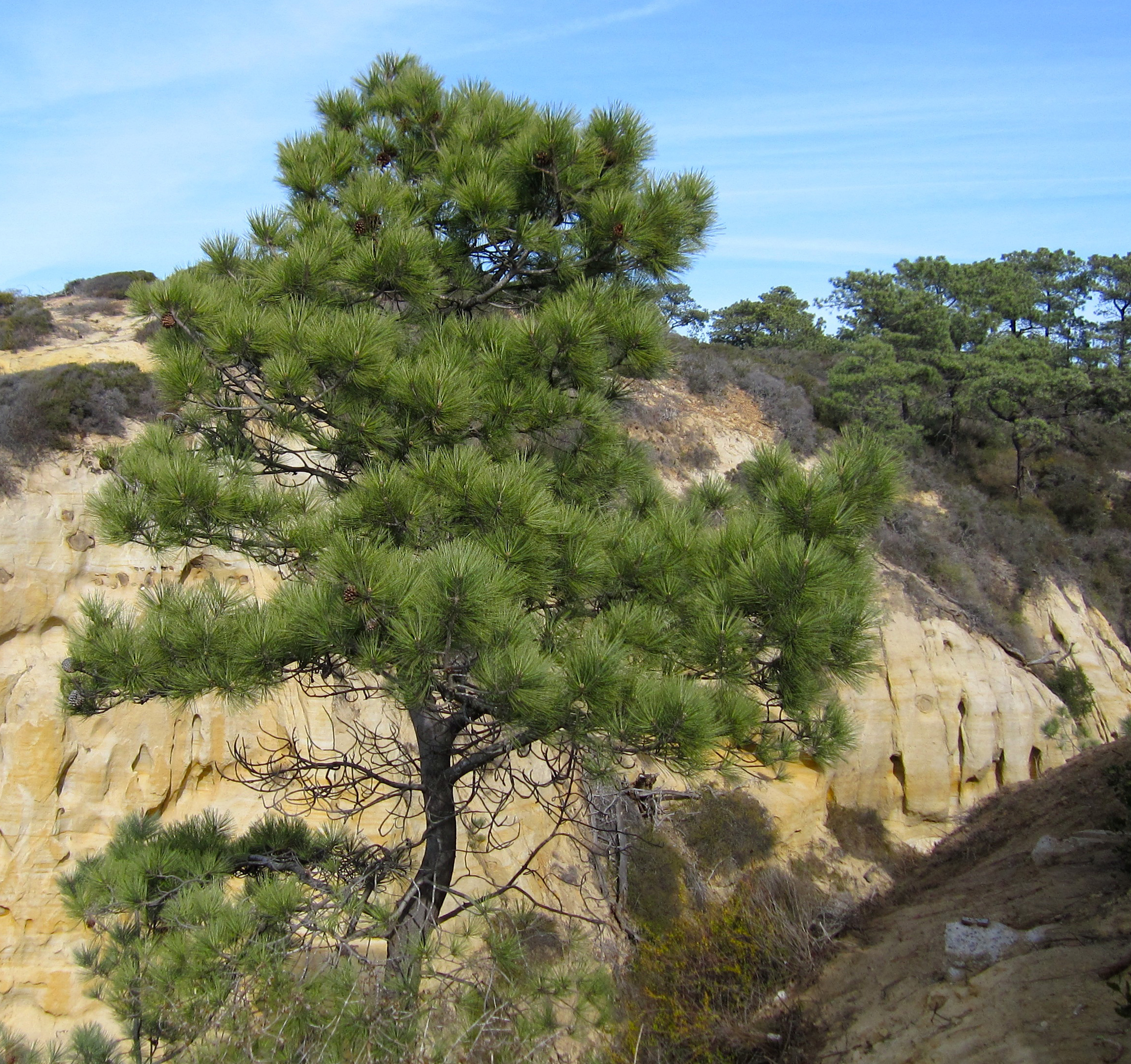
Pinus torreyana at Torrey Pines State Natural Reserve

Her interest in the science of health led her to support Scripps Memorial Hospital, now Scripps Health, and the Scripps Metabolic Clinic, now Scripps Research.

Scripps funded many wildlife preservation and education initiatives, including the San Diego Zoo and Torrey Pines State Natural Reserve. She also provided support for wildlife books such as including William Leon Dawson's Birds of California.

From the 1920s, Scripps was the major benefactor of the San Diego Natural History Museum, financing its building and education programs. In 1933, the Scripps estate donated over 1,000 watercolor paintings of California wildflowers by A.R. Valentien to the museum.

Over 2500 books of her library's book collection were donated to the Claremont Colleges where they can now be accessed from the Claremont Colleges Library and Denison Library.

The New York Times estimated that, during her lifetime, she gave gifts and donations to charitable causes that totaled more than $2 million, a conservative estimate equivalent to $47,195,000 in 2025 dollars.

Although Scripps garnered much public attention from her philanthropic projects, she avoided publicizing her gifts and drawing attention to herself, since "publicity is distasteful to Miss Scripps.

=== Death ===
Ellen Browning Scripps died in her La Jolla home on August 3, 1932, at age 95. Shortly thereafter, the leading newspaper trade journal Editor & Publisher praised her contributions to American journalism: "Many women have contributed, directly and indirectly, to the development of the American press, but none more influentially and beneficently than Ellen Browning Scripps." The New York Times, meanwhile, recognized her as "one of the pioneers in modern American journalism". Her obituary described her as a woman who had perfected "the art of living" as well as the art of giving.

== Legacy ==
Scripps was nominated and inducted into the San Diego Women's Hall of Fame in 2007, hosted by the Women's Museum of California, Commission on the Status of Women, University of California, San Diego Women's Center, and San Diego State University Women's Studies.

The following are institutions Scripps helped to establish or fund:

- Scripps College in Claremont, CA
- Scripps Institution of Oceanography, UC San Diego, est. 1903, formerly known as the Marine Biological Association
- Scripps Pier, UC San Diego, now named Ellen Browning Scripps Memorial Pier
- Scripps Research, formerly Scripps Metabolic Clinic, est. 1924
- Scripps Aquarium, La Jolla (now Birch Aquarium)
- The Bishop's School in La Jolla, San Diego, CA
- Scripps Health, formerly Scripps Memorial Hospital, est. 1924
- La Jolla Woman's Club
- Torrey Pines State Natural Reserve
- The Children's Pool, est. 1931
- Donations to
  - San Diego Zoo
  - San Diego Society of Natural History
  - Cleveland Museum of Natural History
  - Museum of Us, formerly the Museum of Man, ancient Egypt exhibit
  - San Diego Museum Association
  - Pomona College
  - Knox College
  - Constantinople Women's College
  - San Diego State University (Scripps Cottage)
  - San Diego YMCA and YWCA
  - Asilomar Conference Center (YWCA)
  - City of Rushville, Illinois
  - St. James by-the-Sea Episcopal Church, La Jolla
  - La Jolla Athenaeum Music & Arts Library
  - La Jolla-Riford Branch Library
  - The Children's Home, San Diego
  - Community Welfare Building
  - Travelers Aid Society of San Diego

== See also ==
- List of people on the cover of Time Magazine: 1920s - 22 Feb. 1926
