= Athenaeum Music & Arts Library =

Coordinates: 32.8469°N 117.2742°W

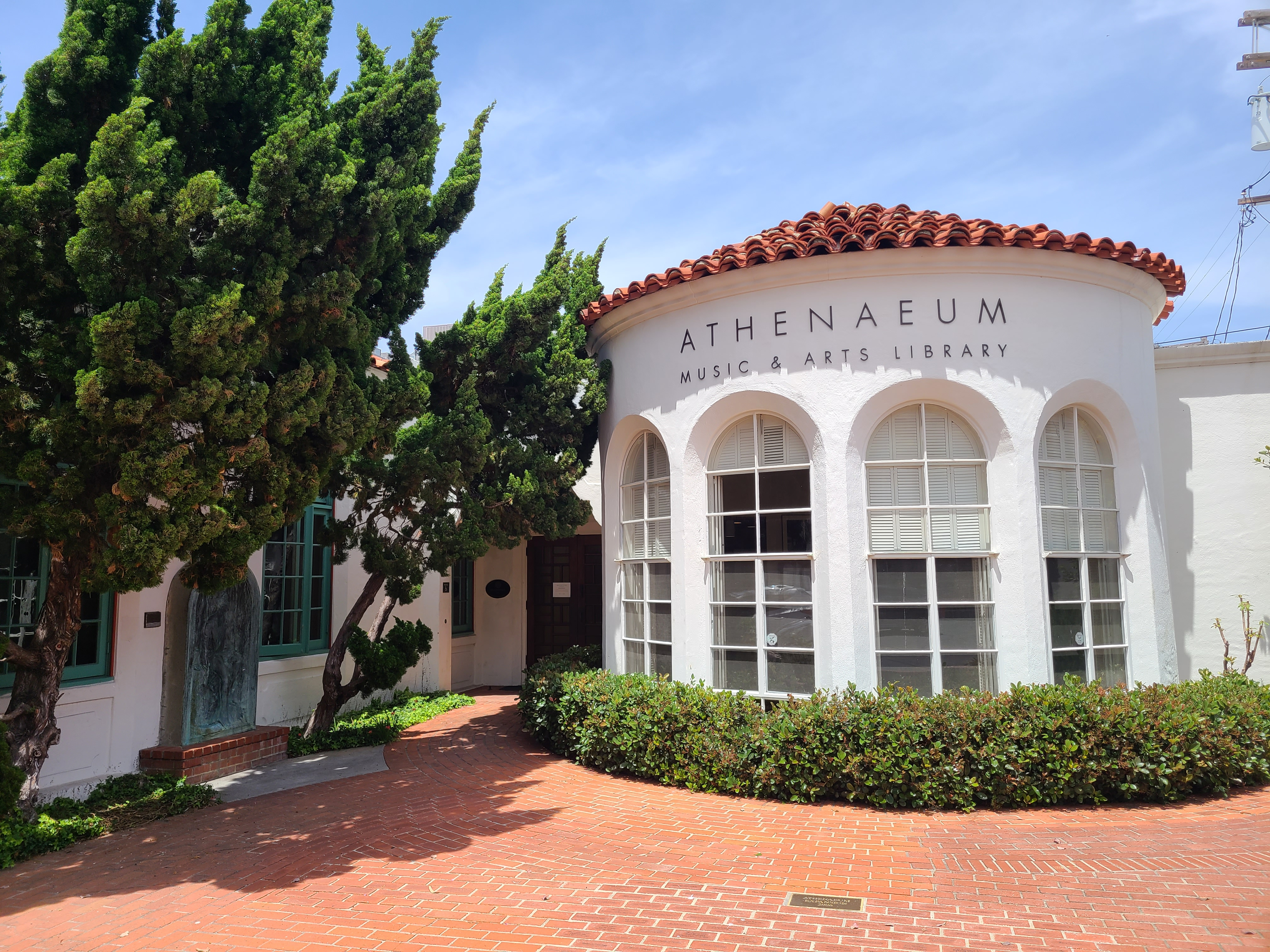

The Athenaeum Music & Arts Library is a non-profit membership library in La Jolla, a community in San Diego, California. In 1884, a group of La Jolla women established the La Jolla Reading Room. By 1898, a reading room was constructed on the corner of Girard Avenue and Wall Street. It was incorporated as the Library Association of La Jolla in 1899.

The library is one of only 16 membership libraries remaining in the United States. It hosts over 100,000 visitors a year and presents year-round concerts, lectures, and public programs, in addition to fine art classes in various media. It houses a unique collection of art and music books, CDs, DVDs, and special collections, and is recognized especially for its collection of artists’ books.

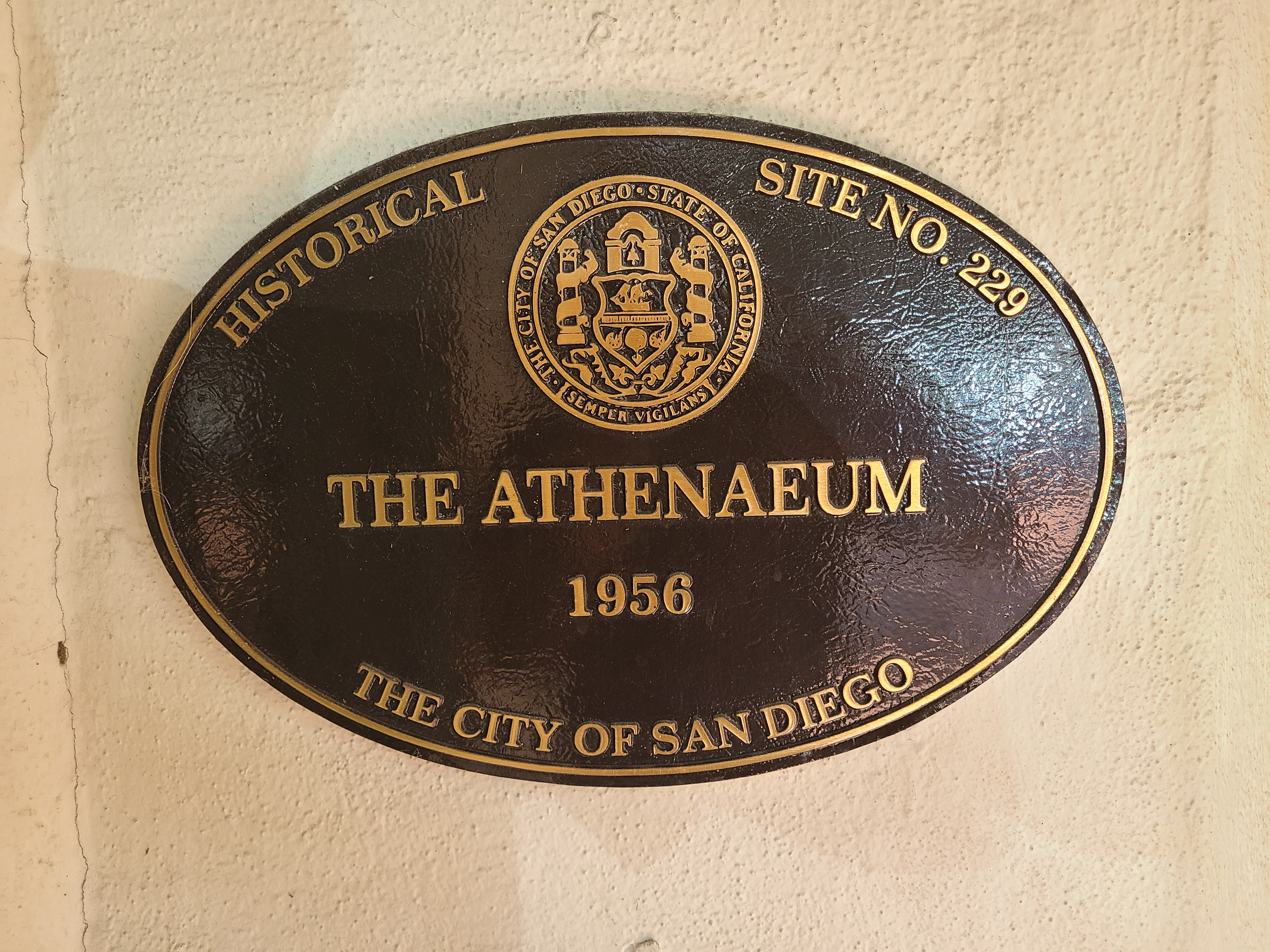
San Diego historical site plaque

The library is housed in three historic buildings, which were joined and remodeled in 2006 following an ambitious capital campaign. In 2016, the Athenaeum Art Center opened in the Logan Heights neighborhood, featuring a print studio and an event space. The library is open to the public five days a week: Tuesday through Saturday, from 10:30 a.m. to 5:30 p.m.

The Library has a reciprocal membership with the Mechanics Institute in San Francisco.
