= Michael Dormer =

Michael Dormer may refer to:

- Michael Dormer (artist), American artist and television producer
- Sir Michael Dormer (lord mayor), Lord Mayor of London in 1541
- Michael Dormer (cricketer), New Zealand cricketer
