= Mount Richardson =

Mount Richardson may refer to:

== Canada ==
- Mount Richardson (Alberta) in 29-16-W5, in Alberta
- Mount Richardson Provincial Park, provincial park, in British Columbia
- Mount Richardson (Quebec), in Gaspésie, Quebec

== New Zealand ==
- Mount Richardson (New Zealand, Canterbury), mount in Canterbury, New Zealand
- Mount Richardson (New Zealand, Otago), mount in Otago, New Zealand
- Mount Richardson (New Zealand, Southland), mount in Southland, New Zealand

== Elsewhere ==
- Mount Richardson (Antarctica), mount in Antarctica
