= Karetu River =

Karetu River may refer to:

- Karetu River (Canterbury), South Island, New Zealand
- Karetu River (Northland), North Island, New Zealand
