= La Jolla Cove =

Inlet on the coast of California, United States

Coordinates: 32°51′2″N 117°16′20″W

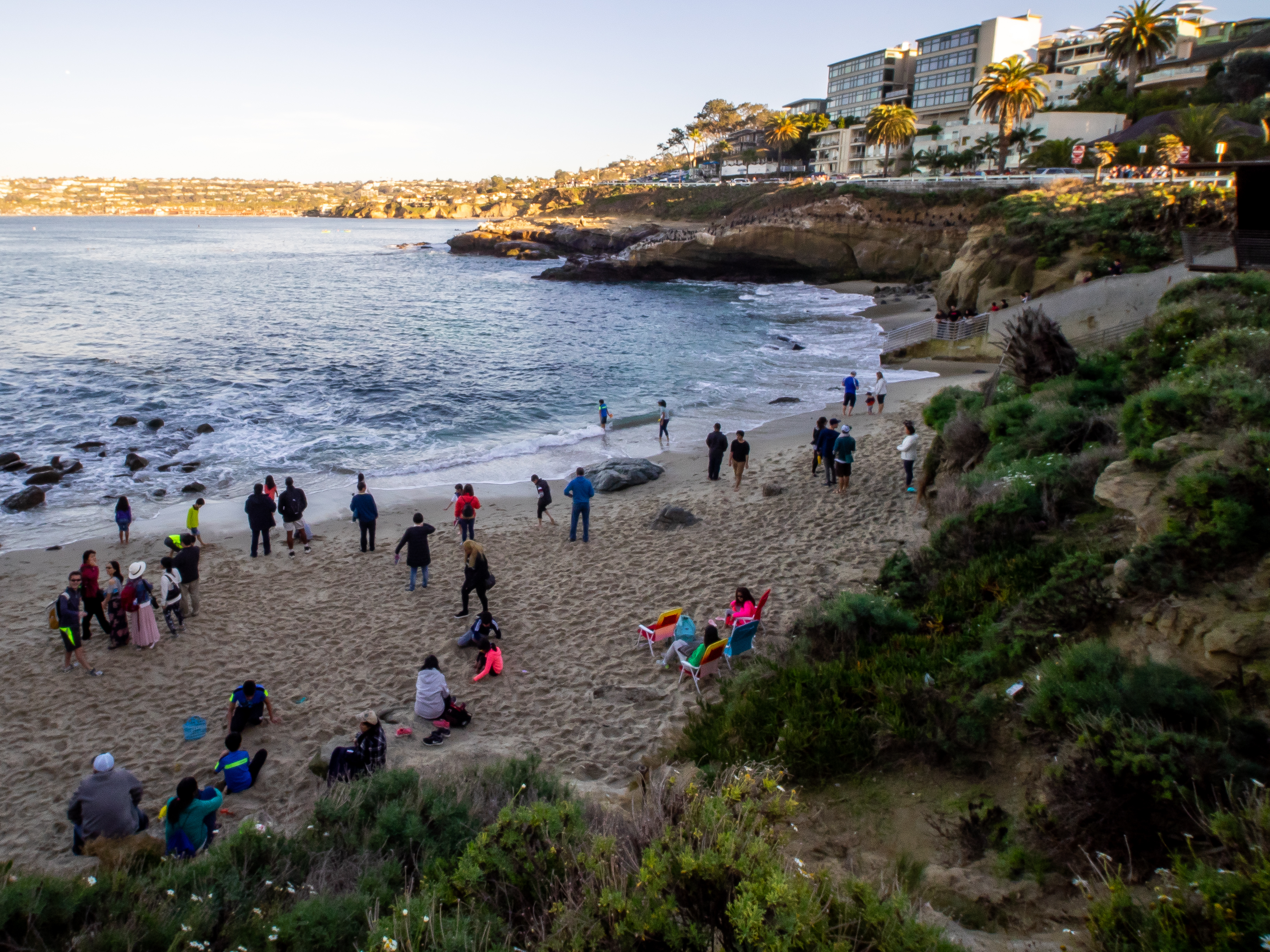
A view of La Jolla Cove, December 2018

La Jolla Cove is a small cove with a beach that is surrounded by cliffs in La Jolla, a community of San Diego, California. Point La Jolla forms the south side of the cove. The area is protected as part of a marine reserve and is popular with snorkelers, swimmers and scuba divers.

The swells that often roll in from the open ocean can be large and strong. The water temperature is often a little colder than the average San Diego beach. While the beach has only a small dry sand area at high tide, during very low tides, tide pools are revealed at the cove.

California sea lions can be found in the waters of the cove and hauling out, temporarily leaving the water to rest on its beaches, cliffs, and bluffs. Similar to the history of the Pacific harbor seals at Children's Pool Beach, there are challenges concerning the interactions of people with the sea lions.

== Description ==
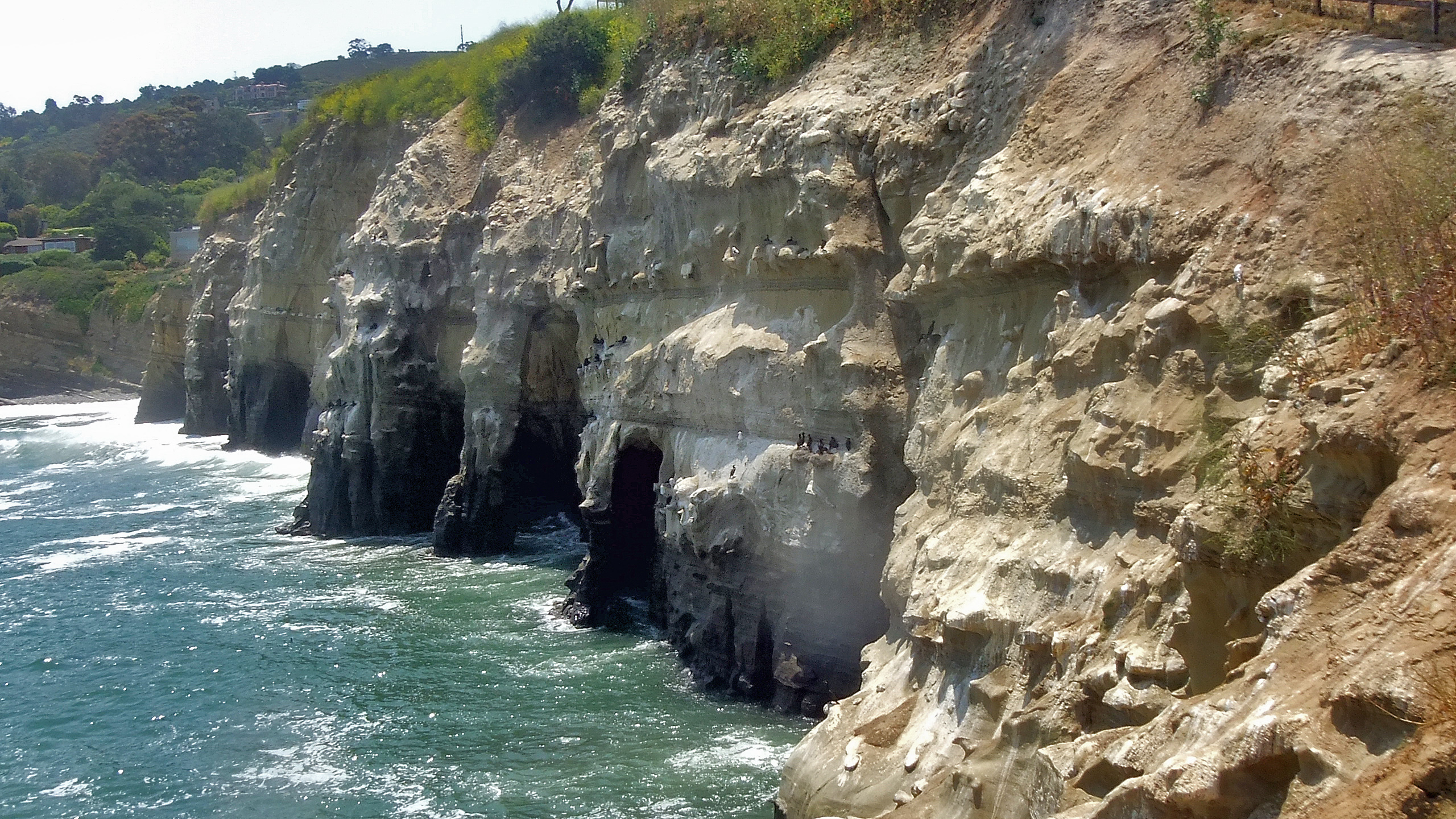
The "7 caves" of La Jolla, just north of the cove.

The beach at the cove is very small, and the sand is gritty. The cove is a very popular spot for swimming, snorkeling and scuba diving. Some swimmers swim to Scripps Pier and back, totaling 3 miles (4.8 km) round trip. The cove is home to many open water swimming events year round including the Rough Water Swim and the 10-mile relay swim (16 km).

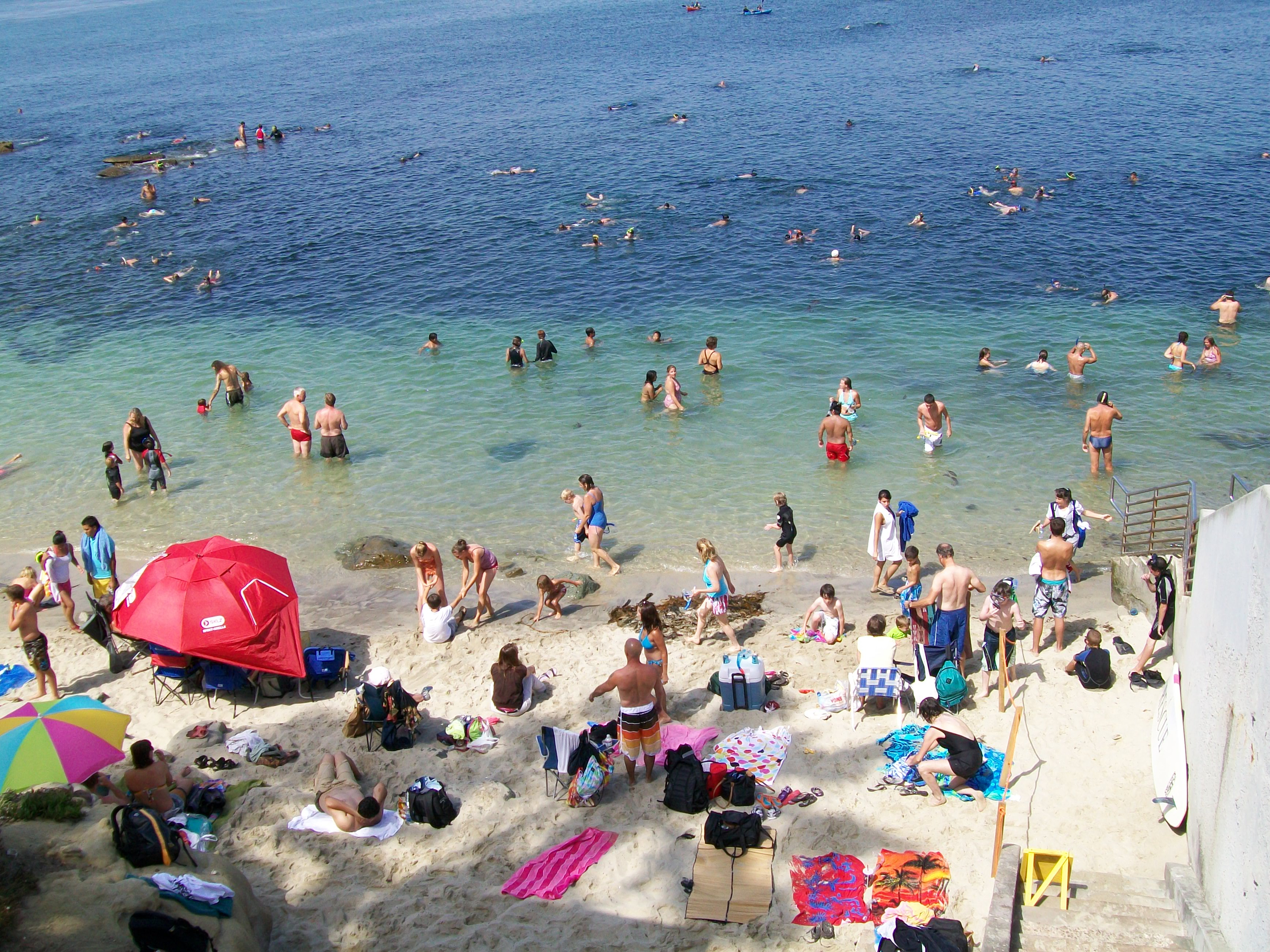
Part of the beach and shallow water at the cove

Because La Jolla Cove is within the San Diego-La Jolla Underwater Park (a marine refuge area), swimming devices such as surfboards, boogie boards, and inflatable mattresses, are not permitted, and kayakers are not allowed into the cove. As an ecological reserve, no fishing is allowed and the collecting of marine invertebrates, (even taking dead specimens or seashells) is prohibited. All sea animals are protected by law, including the orange Garibaldi fish, which are unusually common in the cove. There are hundreds of sea lions that call La Jolla Cove home, sometimes being seen in the deeper-water parts of the cove or basking on rocks.

The water temperature in the cove is sometimes cooler than in some other areas of San Diego's coastline because the cove faces out into much deeper, colder, water. The weather on land is typical of weather in La Jolla, where the temperature year-round seldom exceeds the 50 degrees to 90 degrees range.

The air throughout La Jolla Cove area is filled with the odor of sea lion and bird feces. The smell can be especially strong on the warmest days in the summer. The extensive fecal contamination also has caused unsafe swimming conditions.

=== Access ===
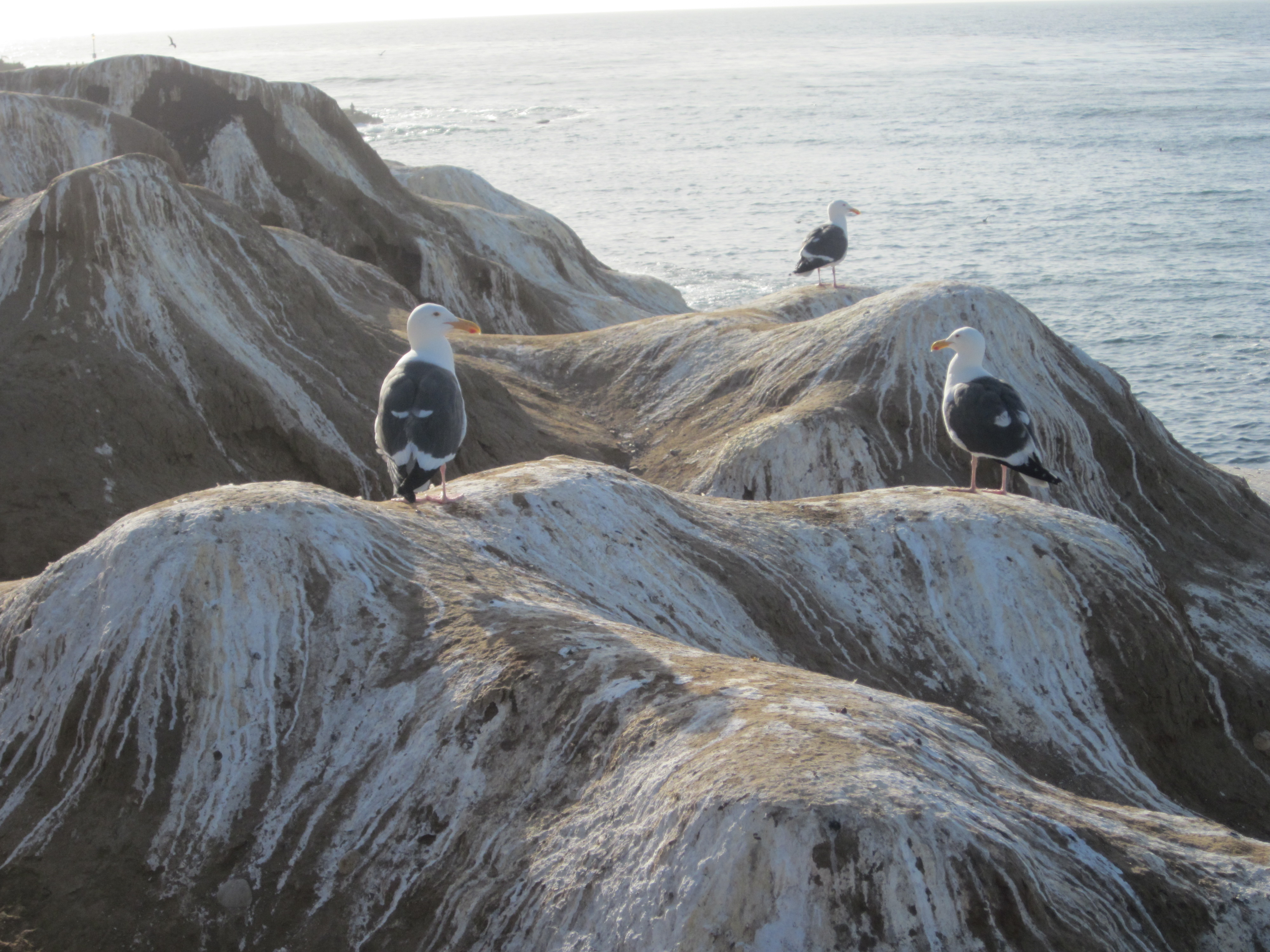
Seagulls at La Jolla Cove are associated with foul odor and unsafe swimming conditions.

Free public parking is extremely limited and is all on-street; there are also paid parking garages in the area. From the park at the top of the cove, there are a few steps down on each side to a "gallery" area with a lot of benches. This gallery includes the entrance to the lifeguard station, where the lifeguard's chalkboard shows useful information updated throughout the day. From the gallery level there are two steep sets of concrete steps that lead down to the beach itself, although visitors may have to step on rocks to get all the way down to the sand.

At the top of the cove there is a group of outdoor showers, and large public restrooms which include one indoor shower and an indoor area with benches and hooks for changing.

=== Surrounding area ===
Up on the bluffs above the beach, and stretching south to other nearby beaches, including Shell Beach and Children's Pool Beach, is Scripps Park, a grassy area with trees and other plantings. Scripps Park is used for picnicking and relaxing.

The La Jolla sea caves, or "The 7 caves of La Jolla", are just north of the cove. The best known of these is Sunny Jim's Sea Cave, a short walking distance from the cove and from the local businesses that are situated up above the shoreline. The cave is accessible through The Cave Store, which charges a nominal fee to go down a staircase leading to the cave itself.

== Sea lions ==
Sea lions at La Jolla Cove, looking across to La Jolla Shores

Primarily as a result of their nationwide protection following the Marine Mammal Protection Act (MMPA) in 1972, California sea lion populations quickly rebounded. The Channel Islands population has greatly expanded and inhabit parts of central and southern California. As the sea lions have occupied more of La Jolla Cove, their interactions with people and property have increased significantly, with both positive and negative outcomes. Large wildlife in urban spaces raises concerns about public health and the safety of people and wildlife in close proximity to each other. These circumstances pose challenging management efforts for the City of San Diego as it seeks to protect the ecological integrity of the area while also ensuring opportunities for public use of the beaches.

=== Wildlife conservation and land use policy ===
According to the Marine Mammal Protection Act (MMPA), while there is no explicitly defined distance in feet to stay away from pinnipeds, including California sea lions, harassing pinnipeds is illegal, and the MMPA defines harassment in two ways:

- any act of pursuit, torment, or annoyance that has the potential to injure a marine mammal; or
- acts that have the potential to disturb but not injure a marine mammal by disrupting certain behaviors, including migration, breathing, nursing, breeding, feeding, or sheltering.

The cove is a public beach as defined by the California Coastal Act and overseen by the California Coastal Commission. Therefore, there is disagreement about who can use the beach and to what extent. Currently the City is pursuing a shared-use policy with educational signs, interpretive docents, and law enforcement by park rangers, lifeguards, and policemen to ensure respect for the wildlife while permitting full use of the beaches.

=== History ===
Earliest references to the sea lions hauling out in the cove, or temporarily leaving the water to rest in significant numbers, are from 2013. At that time La Jolla business owners organized into the nonprofit Citizens for Odor Nuisance Abatement in order to file a civil lawsuit against the City over the “foul odor” caused by shorebird and sea lion poop at the cove, which they claimed was as a public nuisance. The City contracted the cleaning product company Blue Eagle to develop and apply a nontoxic bacterial solution to dissolve the poop without polluting the ocean or harming wildlife. The City additionally installed a public-access gate into a fence along the bluffs east of the cove in hopes that increased foot traffic would disperse the sea lions and reduce the smell.

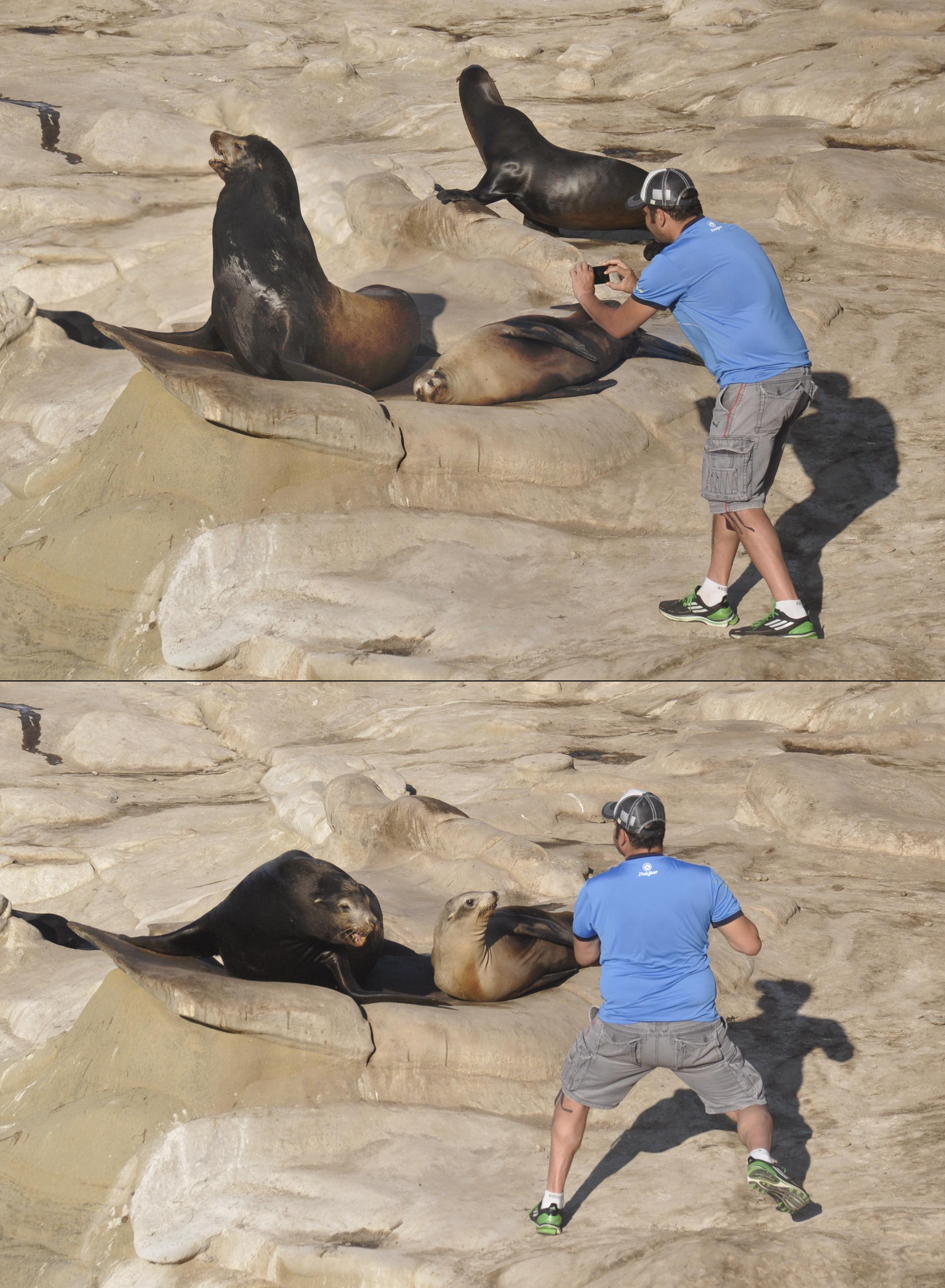
Sea lions being photographed at La Jolla Cove

In 2015, the City contracted the marine and environmental consulting services of Hanan & Associates to study both the seals and sea lions in La Jolla and provide management options. Over the course of the year, they performed a research study on the populations and behaviors of Pacific harbor seals and California sea lions in and around La Jolla and offered several options and management strategies for deterring the pinnipeds from hauling out, as well as increasing public education. In the final report, published the following year, Hanan & Associates additionally noted the overall increase in pinniped populations along the entire coastline and suggested that more research would be necessary to better inform policy decisions.

In 2016 the La Jolla Town Council created the Community Task Force on California Sea Lions, which included representatives from the La Jolla Cove Swim Club, the San Diego Council of Divers, and other members of the La Jolla community, to “gather community input and develop a consensus opinion” through public hearings to provide recommendations for the City.

In 2017 the City increased educational signage around the cove and formally adopted the Marine Coastal Management Plan. The Management Plan, put together by Hanan & Associates, described the nature of the pinniped situation in La Jolla and provided management options. These included options to pursue shared-use, such as introducing an educational docent program, and options to deter the sea lions, specifically “harassment techniques” approved by the National Oceanic and Atmospheric Association (NOAA), which were noted as potentially temporary and objectionable by animals rights groups. Following the release of the Management Plan, the Task Force released a position statement in which its members expressed discontent with some of the recommendations of the Management Plan and their lack of involvement in the process. It concludes by noting that the City continues to pursue “the same beach-sharing approach used to deal with the [seals]” and argues that, due to behavioral differences between the species, this will ultimately be “impractical”.

In a response to this position statement, and following a meeting with a member of the Task Force, the Director of the Parks and Recreation Department wrote that the City’s approach “will remain first and foremost education ... but prioritize having the beach available to visitors”. The following summer, the Shoreline Parks Division of the Parks and Recreation Department hired its first pair of student interns to work as educators and policy-interpreters for one year at the cove. The internship program continued in 2019 with the second pair of student interns. Concerns have been raised about people who are crowding the stairs to view the sea lions and making access difficult for people who want to get to the beach.

== Events ==
La Jolla Cove is home to the annual "La Jolla Cove Rough Water Swim" in September which is one of the oldest ocean swims in the world. It is also home to the annual La Jolla Concours d'Elegance held at the Scripps Park every spring.

La Jolla Cove hosts the La Jolla Christmas Parade & Holiday Festival. This annual festival consists of floats, booths, and vehicles with festive themes such as Santa Claus. This event is a free event thanks to donations and sponsors (Chase, Copy Cove of La Jolla, US Bank). The festival offers activities including arts and crafts tables, pictures with Santa Claus, educational exhibits, and performances of cultures.

== See also ==
- San Diego Historical Landmarks in La Jolla, California
- List of beaches in San Diego County
- List of California state parks

To the North: La Jolla Shores	California beaches	To the South; Shell Beach, La Jolla
