= Shell Beach, California =

Shell Beach, California may refer to:

- Shell Beach, La Jolla
- Shell Beach, Pismo Beach
