= River Garry =

River Garry may refer to:

- River Garry, Inverness-shire
- River Garry, Perthshire

== See also ==
- Garry River, New Zealand
