= Karetu River (Canterbury) =

Coordinates: 43.198723°S 172.462333°E

Location
- Country: New Zealand

Physical characteristics
- Mouth
  - location: Okuku River
- Length: 12 km (7.5 mi)

The Karetu River is a river of New Zealand's eastern South Island. It flows south from the slopes of Mount Karetu before its outflow into the Okuku River at the edge of the Canterbury Plains 40 kilometres (25 mi) northwest of Christchurch.

== See also ==
- List of rivers of New Zealand
