= Glentui River =

Coordinates: 43°15′S 172°18′E

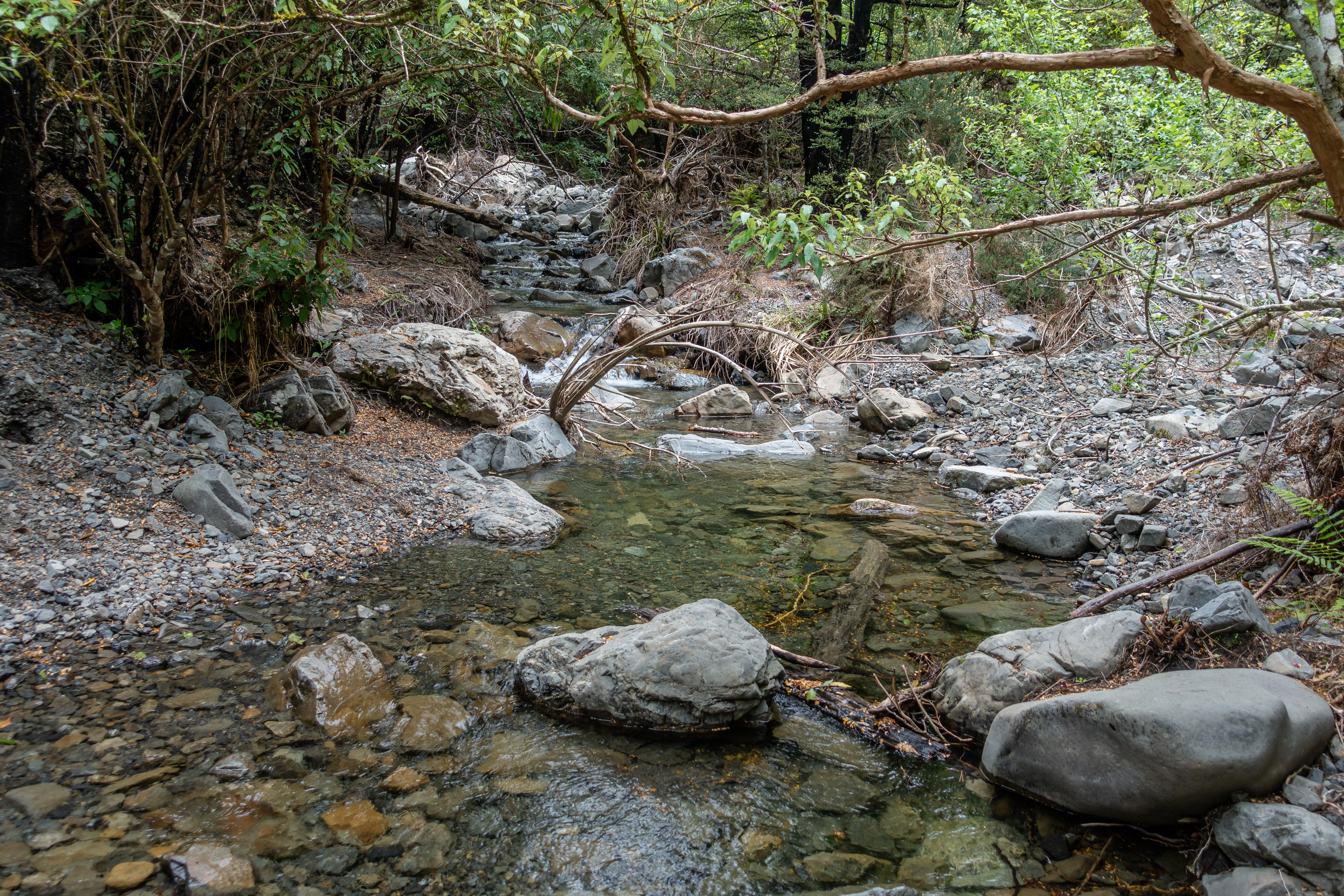
- Glentui River near a track to Mt Richardson

- Location of the mouth within New Zealand

Location
- Country: New Zealand

Physical characteristics
- Source
  - location: Mount Richardson
- Mouth
  - location: Ashley River / Rakahuri

The Glentui River is a river in the Canterbury region of New Zealand. It arises on the slopes of Mount Richardson and flows south-east through the locality of Glentui and into Ashley River / Rakahuri, which exits in the Pacific Ocean. The river was earlier called Tui Creek, and the locality named from the station Glentui established by H.C.H. Knowles in 1854.

There are nature and waterfall walking tracks along the river.

== See also ==
- List of rivers of New Zealand
