= Townshend River =

Coordinates: 43°11′S 172°08′E

Location
- Country: New Zealand

Physical characteristics
- Source
  - location: Puketeraki Range
- Mouth
  - location: Ashley River / Rakahuri
- Length: 14 km (8.7 mi)

The Townshend River is a river of the Canterbury region of New Zealand's South Island. It rises in the Puketeraki Range 20 kilometres (12 mi) north of Springfield and flows generally east to reach the Ashley River / Rakahuri 10 kilometres (6 mi) north of Oxford, upstream from the Ashley Gorge.

== See also ==
- List of rivers of New Zealand
