= Marine Street Beach =

Public beach in La Jolla, San Diego, California

- Beach
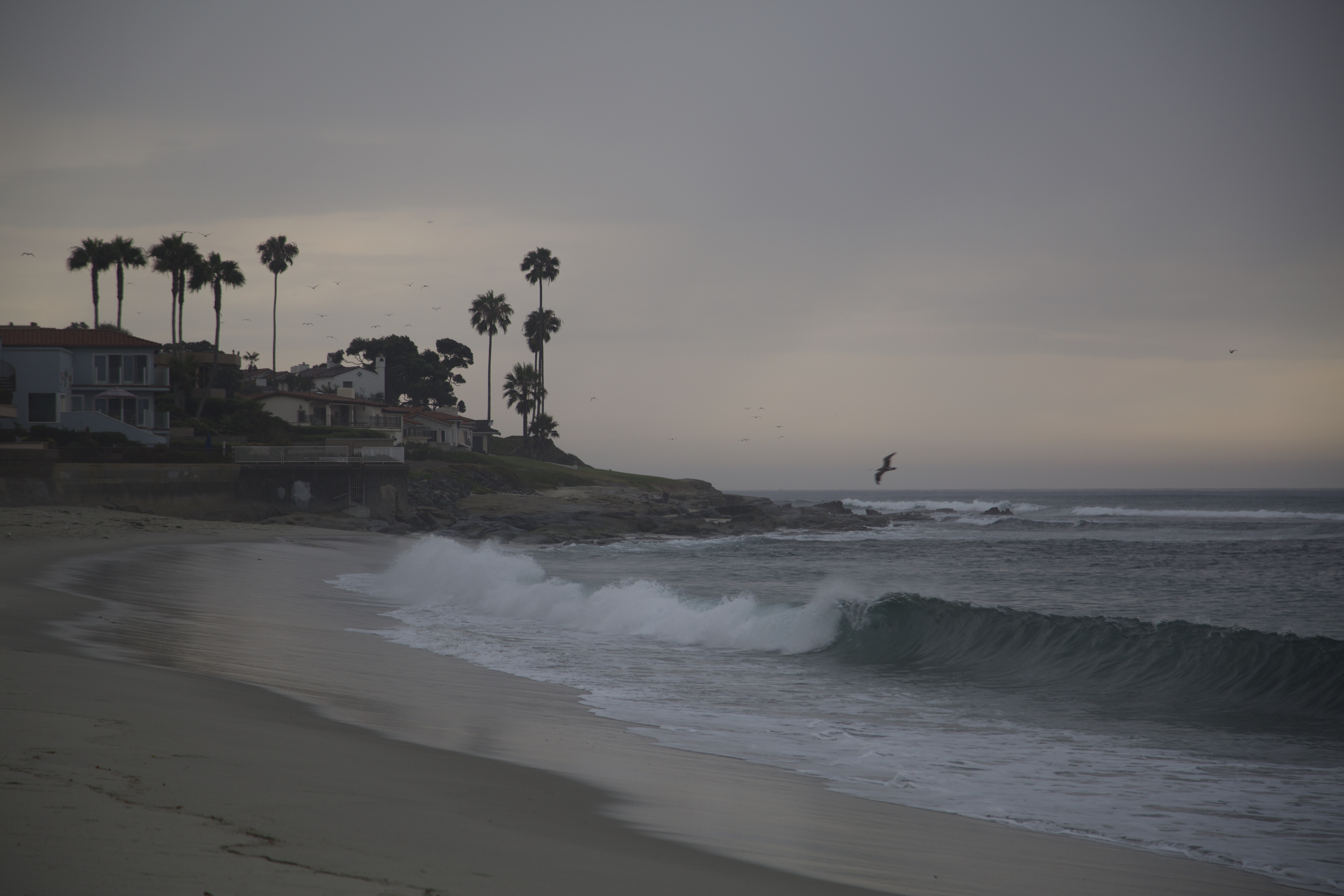
- Marine Street Beach at sunrise

- Location within California
- Coordinates: 32.837°N 117.282°W
- Location: San Diego, California

Dimensions
  - Length: 1,780 ft (540 m)
- Patrolled by: San Diego Lifeguard Services
- Access: Marine Street, Sea Lane

Marine Street Beach is a public beach in the community of La Jolla in San Diego, California, on the Pacific Ocean. It sits at the western terminus of Marine Street, with Children's Pool Beach to the north and Windansea Beach to the south. The surf has been described as rough and not suitable for children. However, the rough surf has made the beach popular with surfers and bodyboarders. Nearby kelp beds host marine life making the area a popular dive spot.

Marine Street Beach is patrolled by lifeguards in the summer, and on peak weekends during the spring and fall. Facilities are limited, with no public bathrooms, picnic areas, or a designated parking lot. Free parking is available on surface streets in the surrounding residential neighborhood.

== See also ==
- List of beaches in San Diego County
- List of California state parks

To the North: Children's Pool Beach	California beaches	To the South; Windansea Beach

To the North: Children's Pool Beach	California beaches	To the South; Windansea Beach
