= Makerikeri River =

Coordinates: 43°17′S 172°33′E

Location
- Country: New Zealand

Physical characteristics
- Mouth
  - location: Ashley River / Rakahuri
- Length: 16 km (9.9 mi)

The Makerikeri River is a river of the north Canterbury region of New Zealand's South Island. It flows south from its headwaters 15 kilometres (9 mi) west of Amberley, reaching the Ashley River / Rakahuri close to Rangiora.

== See also ==
- List of rivers of New Zealand
