= Bill Andrews (photographer) =

American surfer and photographer

Bill Andrews (1944-2017) was a surfer, documentary photographer/videographer, and archivist. During his daily reportage of modern surf culture, Andrews archived over 20,000 surf-related photographs and videos. Some of his work has been preserved online.

Andrews grew up surfing in La Jolla, California. He caught his first wave in 1957 at La Jolla Shores Beach. By the early sixties, he had joined the line-up at Windansea Beach, and with other local surfers, he helped establish Black's Beach as a world class break. The Surfer's Journal calls Andrews the “first Black’s local”, a considerable accomplishment given the difficult trail or long paddle to access Black's Beach at that time. In 1965 Andrews’ reputation landed him on the cover of Surfer magazine. The Ron Stoner photograph shows Andrews crouched and gliding on infinite wave face glass at Black's.

With time, Andrews' long-lived and vocal presence, in and out of the water, made him something of a surf sage. He was cited in numerous articles and videos on surf history including "Welcome to Windansea" by Chris Ahrens, "The Strange Disappearance of Ron Stoner" by Matt Warshaw, PHOTO/STONER by Matt Warshaw, and Ty Ponder's "Sea Level Pressure." Andrews has also appeared in "Magnificent Obsessions" on Voom Network, "Southern California Son" by James Weaver, and "Core La Jolla Shores" by Fred Stoughton.

In 2016 Andrews was diagnosed with ALS. Using a walker he designed himself and later, a motorized wheelchair he also customized, Andrews continued to frequent his favorite beaches. Local media broadcast his story to a new audience, calling him a legendary surfer and one of the last great watermen. Bill Andrews died 26 October 2017. An announcement by SURFER ends in Andrews' own words, “Every day spent surfing was worth it, and I wouldn’t change a thing.”
