= Lilburne River =

Coordinates: 43.075937°S 172.172695°E

Location
- Country: New Zealand

Physical characteristics
- Source
  - location: Puketeraki Range
- Mouth
  - location: Ashley River / Rakahuri
- Length: 14 km (8.7 mi)

The Lilburne River is a river of northern Canterbury, New Zealand. Formerly known as the Lillburn River, its spelling was corrected in 2003. It rises in the Puketeraki Range, flowing south then east to join Ashley River / Rakahuri.

== See also ==
- List of rivers of New Zealand
