= Hot Curl =

Cartoon character

Hot Curl is a cartoon character created in 1963 by Michael Dormer and Lee Teacher.

In 1963, Dormer and his friend, Lee Teacher, sculpted Hot Curl a 400-pound concrete statue, and installed it on the rocks near the surf shack at La Jolla's famed Windansea Beach in San Diego, California. The sculpture of a mop-haired, 6-foot-tall (1.8 m), knobby-kneed surfer gazed out at the sea with a beer in his hand. The pot-bellied surf god quickly became a nationwide sensation appearing in SURFtoons comics and as a plastic model kit, selling hundreds of thousands of copies. MPC, the maker of the Hot Curl kit, expanded the franchise with kits of Curl's Gurl and skateboarder Hot Shot, Curl's brother, with his dog Hot Dog. A smaller-scale model of Hot Curl was included in some issues of MPC's 1929 Ford pickup/woodie kit. In 1964, Hot Curl became a movie star, appearing in Muscle Beach Party.

Hot Curl is similar to Kustom Kulture and Lowbrow Art about surfing and hot-rods of 1960s California, like Rick Griffin’s Murphy and Ed "Big Daddy" Roth's Rat Fink.

In 2007, Hot Curl featured in Surfer magazine. in a series of cartoons.
