= Children's Pool Beach =

Beach in San Diego, California, United States

Coordinates: 32.847638°N 117.278433°W

Children's Pool Beach (also known as Casa Beach) is a small sandy beach in La Jolla, a community of San Diego, California.

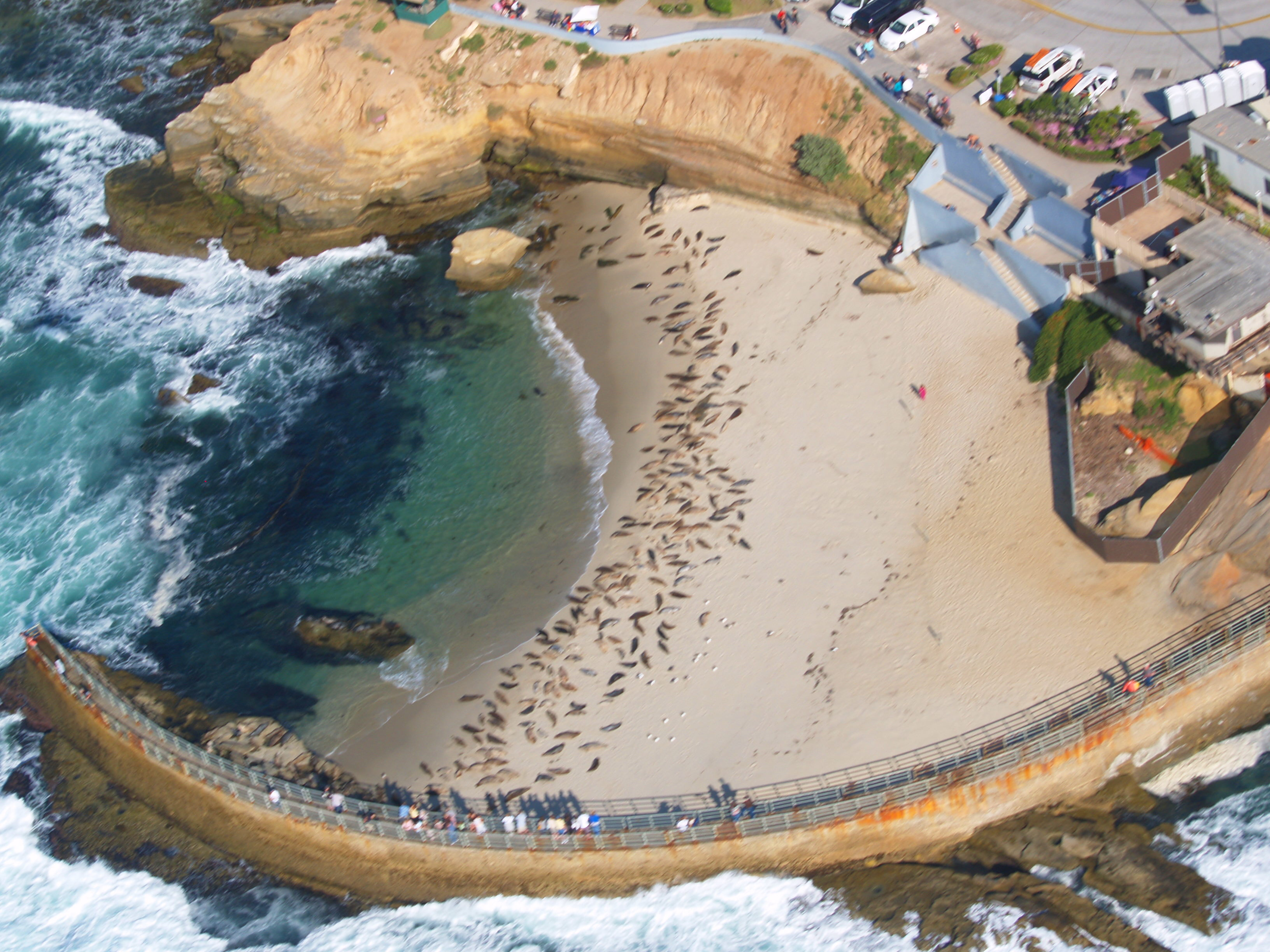
Aerial view of the pool, May 2011, with over 200 seals on the beach

The Children's Pool earned its name after the construction of a concrete breakwater in 1931. The structure was gifted to the community of La Jolla by local philanthropist Ellen Browning Scripps, who paid for the construction of a breakwater project in order to create a place where children could play and swim that would be protected from waves. The gift was confirmed by an act, signed by California governor James Rolph Jr. in 1931.

The Children's Pool has become the subject of a debate related to a growing colony of harbor seals which has inhabited the beach since the mid-1990s.

== Seals and sea lions ==
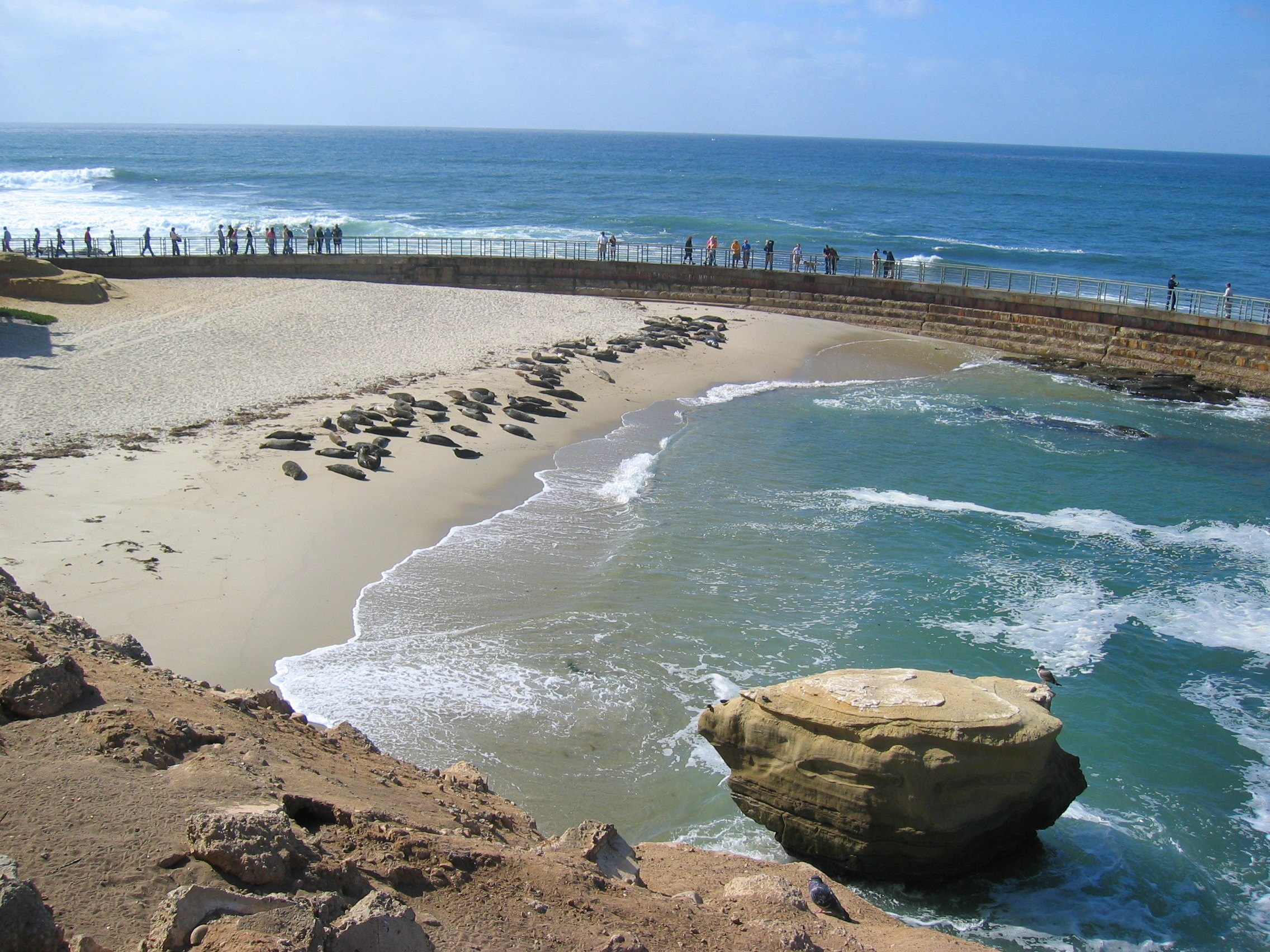
More than sixty seals resting on the sand at Children's Pool, October 2005

=== History ===
The San Diego City Council in 1992 noted that the population of marine mammals and particularly harbor seals had been increasing over the past 10 years. In November 1994, the city created a Marine Mammal Reserve. The Reserve was created for a 5-year period and later renewed for a second 5-year period. The boundary of the reserve extended almost to the seaward entrance to Children's Pool. State agencies expressed conflicting opinions about the legal ability of the city to create this reserve.

In 1994 some seals were observed to haul out in the area, but no seals were seen on the beach at Children's Pool, according to a report by the National Marine Fisheries Service. By 1996 twice as many seals were using the beach as were using nearby rocks. Seal pup births were observed at Children's Pool for the first time in 1999. The NMFS attributed the change to the increase in the local seal population, an increase which had been observed throughout the West Coast.

In September 1997 the city closed Children's Pool to swimming because of "continuously high fecal coliform counts". The high bacterial count was later confirmed to be caused by "a seal excrement overload". At that time a discussion began about whether the seals should be removed from the Children's Pool beach. Some wanted it to be treated as a marine mammal sanctuary, while others wanted to preserve it for recreational swimming. The California Coastal Commission ruled that Children's Pool could not be used as a marine preserve and must remain open to public access. In February 2000, the National Marine Fisheries Service (NMFS) said it intended to manage the area as a "harbor seal natural haul-out and rookery". In February 2003 the NMFS told the city it could not intentionally harass the seals at Children's Pool in order to remove them but could undertake activities that might temporarily displace the seals such as a dredging project to improve the water quality at Children's Pool. In 2004 the NMFS said the matter was "a local issue for the city to resolve" and that the city can remove seals it considers a nuisance (i.e., presenting a public nuisance or causing a public health hazard) from the beach if it chooses to.

As of late 2009, about 200 harbor seals were using the beach regularly. The seals have become a popular tourist attraction, bringing in thousands of dollars to local businesses.

=== Legal actions ===
Various lawsuits, appeals, and state laws have been filed over these issues. On August 25, 2005, the judge hearing the case O'Sullivan vs. City of San Diego ordered the city to "employ all reasonable means to restore the Pool to its 1941 condition" by removing accumulated sand and solving the bacteria problem. The order was unanimously upheld by a 3-judge appeals court in 2007.

In July 2009 the governor of California signed legislation, authored by state senator Christine Kehoe, modifying the uses the beach could be put to. The legislation specified that in addition to the original list of uses, the beach could also be used as a marine mammal sanctuary, and it gave the City Council the power to decide. Effective January 1, 2010, the council was able to make the area an official seal sanctuary if it so chose. The Council stated its intention to keep the area a seal sanctuary rather than disperse the seals.

Also in July 2009, Judge Yuri Hofman ordered the city to begin removing the seals from the beach by July 23 or face heavy fines. The city asked for a stay, and the judge set aside his own order just hours before the deadline. He scheduled a new hearing for October 6, saying the new state law warranted another hearing so that the matter could be sorted out. On September 22, Hofman transferred the case to Judge Timothy Taylor in response to a challenge from a pro-seal attorney regarding Hofman's ability to rule fairly in a related lawsuit. On September 28 Judge Taylor announced that the October 6 hearing was being moved to November 13.

On November 13, 2009, Judge Taylor decided that San Diego would not have to disperse the seals, overturning the previous judicial orders. He said those decisions were correct when they were issued, but that the state legislation signed in July made it illogical now to force the city to get rid of the established colony. The effect of his decision was to allow the seals to stay, pending City Council action in January 2010, when the new law was to take effect. The decision could be appealed, but the attorney who was leading the efforts to remove the seals was noncommittal, saying that "This could be the end of the line."

In April 2010, the City Council's Natural Resources Committee approved a plan that would close the beach to the public from December to May and install a year-round rope barrier. The proposal would also ban dogs from the beach and seek funding for a regular patrol of the area. The proposal was ratified by the full City Council in May 2010. The proposal was not yet law; it was still subject to permitting, environmental review and possible review by the Coastal Commission. Meanwhile, the current policy remained in effect, allowing shared use of the beach by humans and seals, with an advisory rope barrier during pupping season.

On June 3, 2011, a judge ruled that the rope barrier intended to keep visitors away from the seals at Children's Pool beach could be removed, throwing out a preliminary injunction.

On April 12, 2013, a judge and the Coastal Commission approved a year-round rope barrier as a deterrent for people getting too close to the seals. A narrow passageway in the barrier would be maintained to allow public access to the water from the beach.

=== Situation at the beach ===
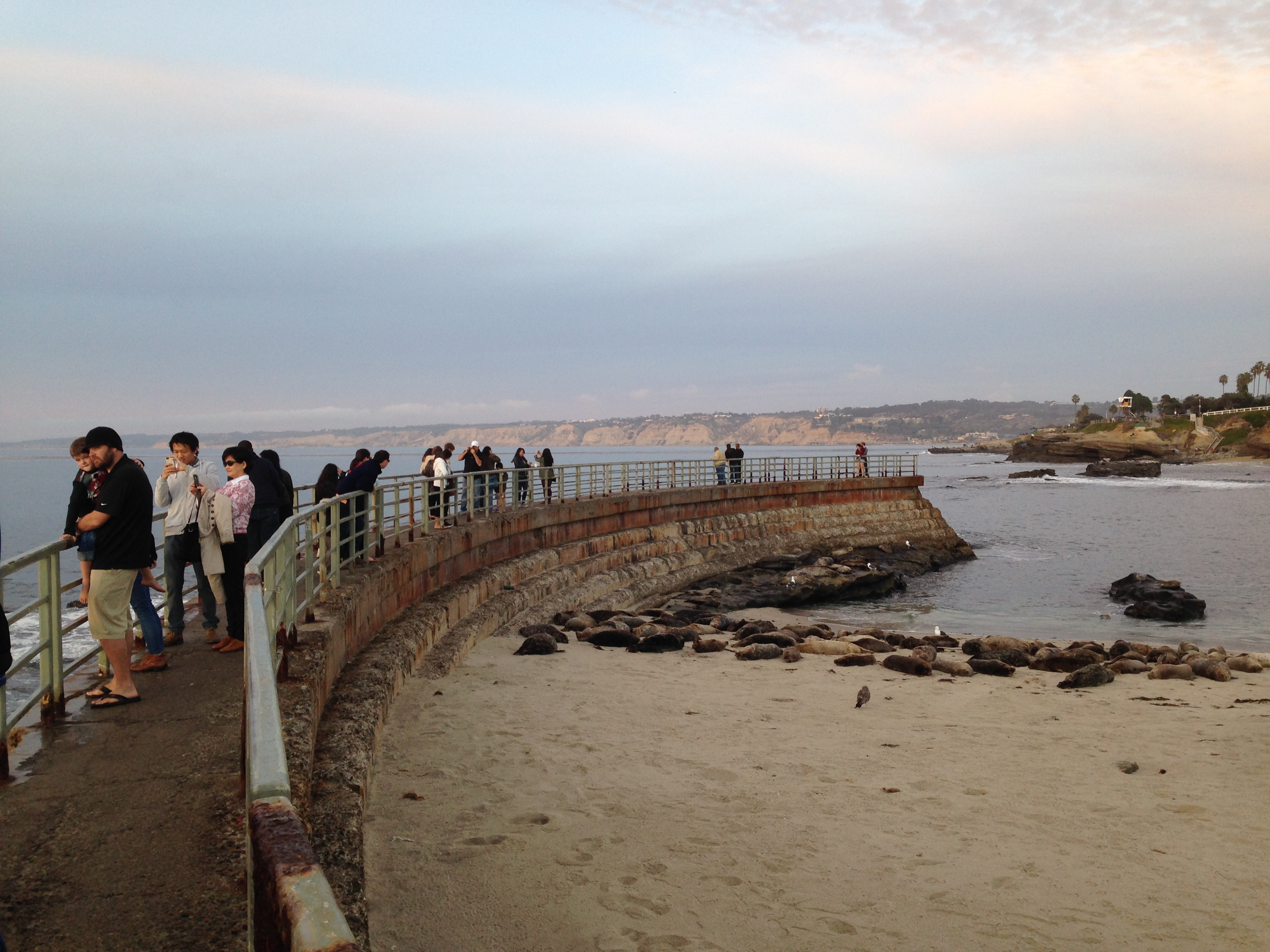
The beach in 2014

Lifeguards and seal advocates monitor the beach area. Swimming is allowed, but not recommended due to the high amount of bacteria from seal feces.

The city has maintained a rope barrier from December 15 through May 15, so that pregnant seals can rest and give birth on the beach without humans coming too close and frightening them. Pupping season is officially mid-January to mid-April. The appellate court ruled in 2007 that the barrier is illegal. In 2008 a federal appeals court judge gave permission for the city to reinstall the rope. The rope barrier is "advisory", with an opening for the public to pass through, as mandated by the Coastal Commission.

The city lifeguard service warns that "Like all wild animals, seals and sea lions are unpredictable and can become aggressive quickly. They have sharp teeth and may bite, particularly if cornered or harassed." Sea lions in particular are territorial and can be aggressive, and should be given a wide berth.

The San Diego Police Department says that police have responded to "numerous calls for service at Children's Pool involving alleged incidents of threatened assault and intimidation" between seal advocates, swimmers and divers, and that in some cases citations have been issued or people taken into custody. A La Jolla man was indicted for sending e-mailed death threats to a seal advocate who was videotaping interactions between divers and seals, and to the Animal Protection and Rescue League.

In 2013 Mayor Bob Filner approved the installation of a camera (donated by the Western Alliance for Nature) in order to monitor the seals, their behavior, and people interacting with them. This camera (with night vision) was installed on the abandoned lifeguard tower. Harassment by humans of the seals was witnessed almost immediately after the camera was installed. After video of the abuse went viral, people were outraged and Mayor Filner ordered the Children's Pool closed at night in order to protect the pregnant seals and their newborn (and recently born) pups.

A CNN article from March 21, 2013, featured a night-time video of the Children's Pool Beach that showed two young women abusing the seals. On April 2, 2014, two women suspects who were accused of mistreatment of animals, were taken to court. They were charged in Superior Court with a City municipal code violation. The judge decided there was not enough evidence to identify the women so the case was dismissed.

== In popular culture ==
The pool was used as a backdrop for 1980 film The Stunt Man. Half of the 582nd episode of This American Life, titled "When the Beasts Come Marching In" and originally aired March 12, 2016, discusses the conflicts between seal advocates and beach-goers at Children's Pool and features interviews with those involved.

== See also ==
- List of beaches in San Diego County
- List of California state parks

To the North; Shell Beach, La Jolla	California beaches	To the South; Marine Street Beach

To the North: Shell Beach, La Jolla	California beaches	To the South; Windansea Beach
