= List of beaches in San Diego County =

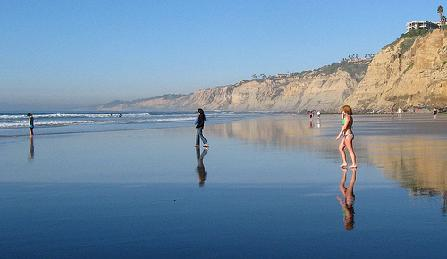
La Jolla Shores Beach

This is a list of beaches in San Diego County, California. The beaches are listed in order from north to south, and they are grouped (where applicable) by the community in which the beach is situated.

Some beaches in the San Diego area are long continuous stretches of sandy coastline, others, like many of the beaches in the Village of La Jolla (which was built on a large rocky promontory), are small sand beaches within rocky coves or between rocky points. A number of beaches in the San Diego area have cliffs behind them, usually composed of rather soft sandstone; some other beaches front freshwater lagoons where rivers run into the coast.

== Beaches in North County ==
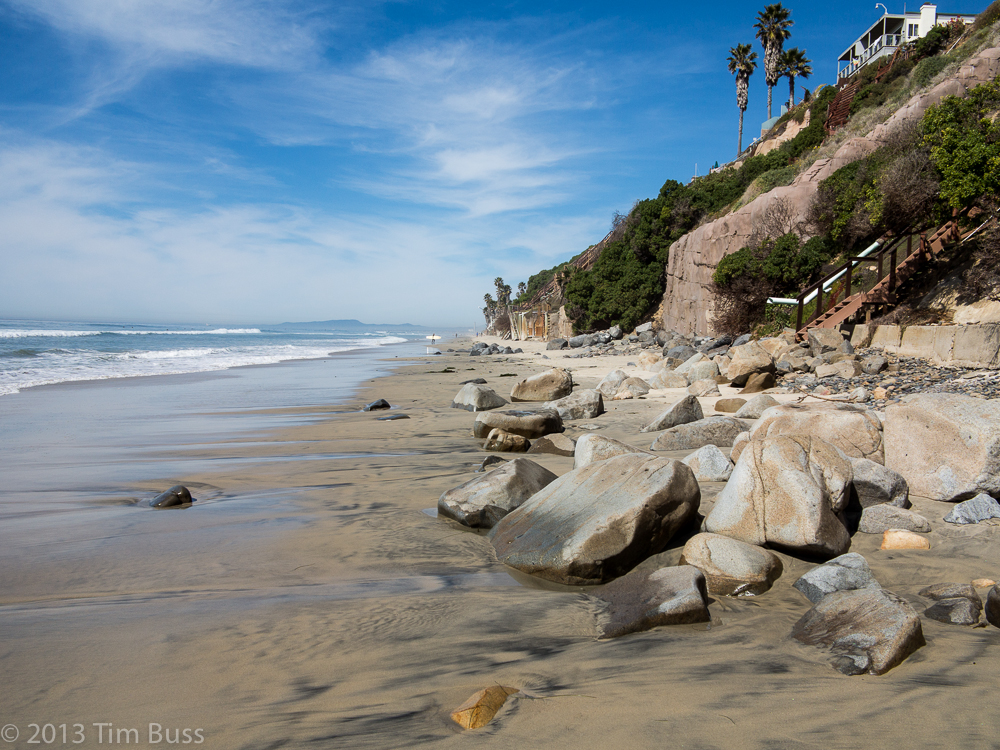
Beacon's Beach in Leucadia

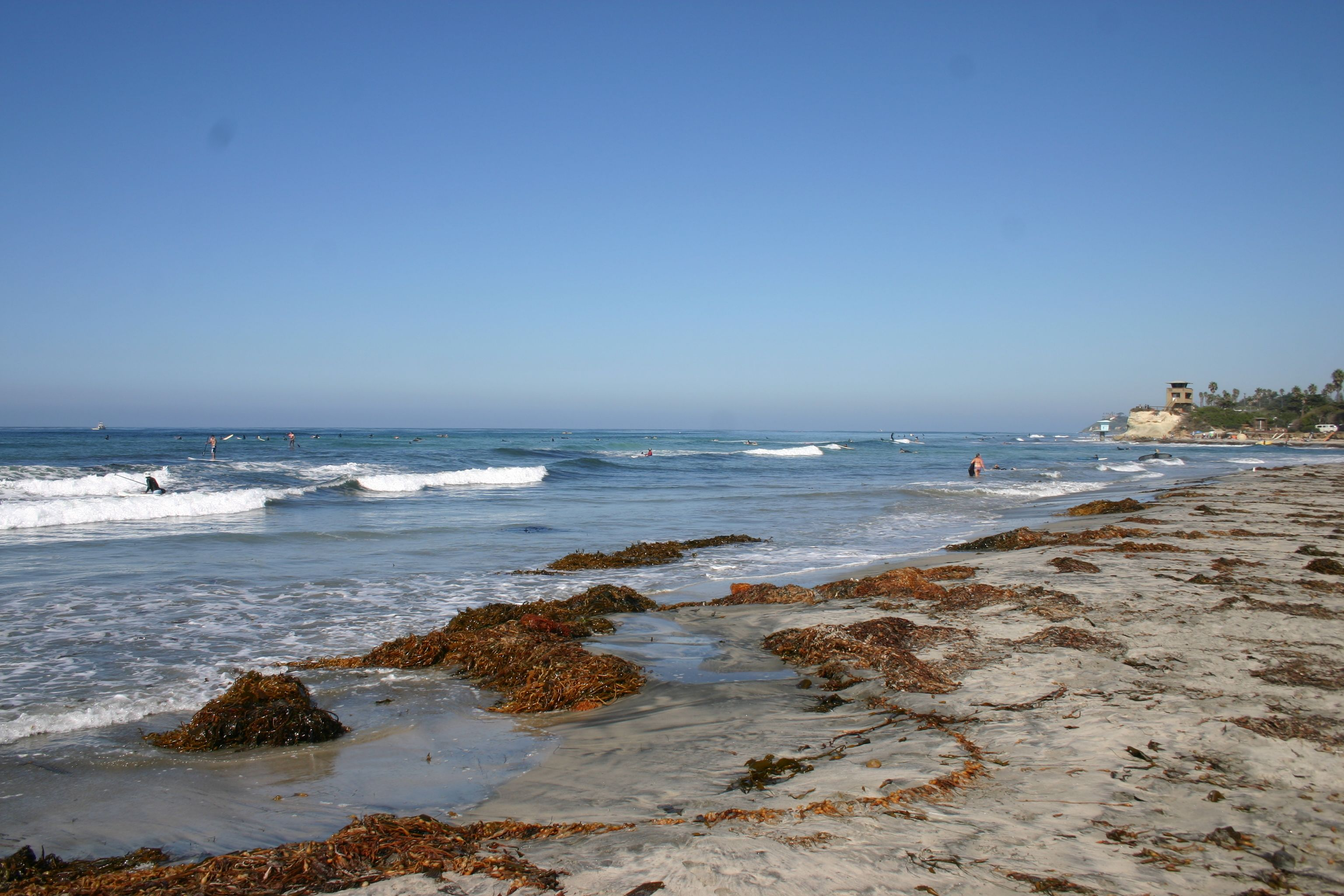
View from Cardiff State Beach

This list of beaches in San Diego's North County is arranged from north to south; the beaches are grouped by the communities in which they occur. Although in some areas there may be a continuous long stretch of sand along several miles of coastline, especially so during low tides, nonetheless there may be different beach names at different locations, according to where the beach is accessed.

- San Onofre State Beach
  - Upper Trestles
  - Trestles
  - Lower Trestles, Church
  - Old Man's
  - Trails
- Camp Pendleton a.k.a. Marine Corps Base Camp Pendleton, has 17 miles (27 km) of coastline
  - Del Mar Beach Resort at Camp Pendleton— in order to visit you must have base access.
- Oceanside:
  - Harbor Beach
  - Oceanside (Pier)
  - The Strand (North and South)
  - Oceanside Boulevard
  - Buccaneer
  - Cassidy Street
  - Saint Malo Beach
- Carlsbad:
  - North Carlsbad beaches
  - Carlsbad City Beach
  - Tamarak Surf Beach
  - Carlsbad State Beach
  - Terra Mar Point
  - South Carlsbad State Beach
    - Ponto Beach
- Leucadia:
  - Grandview Beach
  - Beacons Beach, a.k.a. Leucadia State Beach
  - Stone Steps
- Encinitas:
  - Moonlight State Beach
  - D Street Beach
  - Boneyard Beach a.k.a. Boneyards
  - Swami's Beach
- Cardiff:
  - Pipes
  - San Elijo State Beach
  - Cardiff Reef
  - George's
  - Cardiff State Beach
  - Seaside
  - Tabletop
- Solana Beach:
  - Tide Park
  - Fletcher Cove Park, a.k.a. Pillbox
  - Seascape Surf, a.k.a. Seascape Beach
  - Del Mar Shores
- Del Mar:
  - Dog Beach, a.k.a. The River Mouth
  - Del Mar City Beach
  - Powerhouse Park

== Beaches in the city of San Diego ==
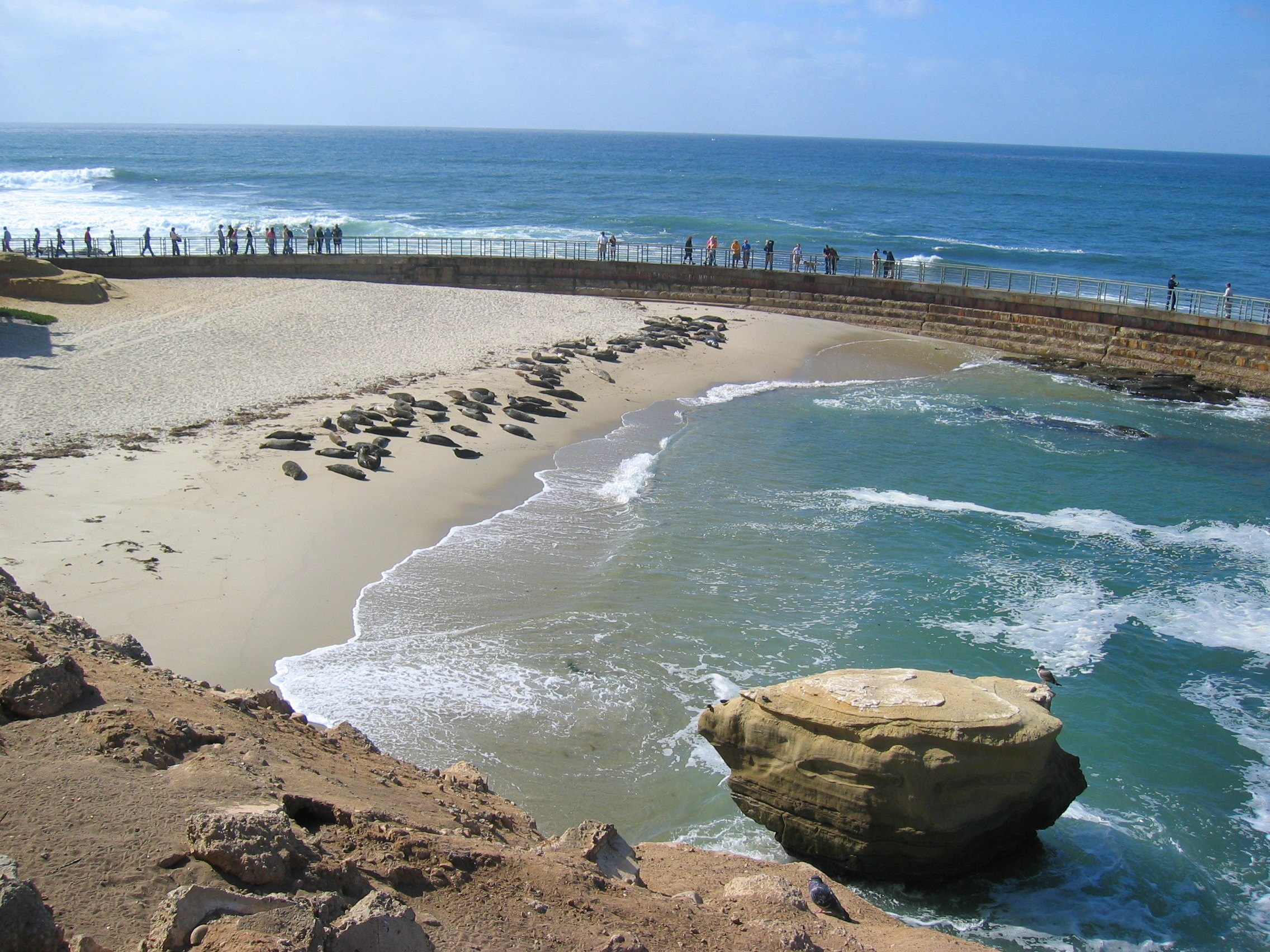
Children's Pool beach in La Jolla

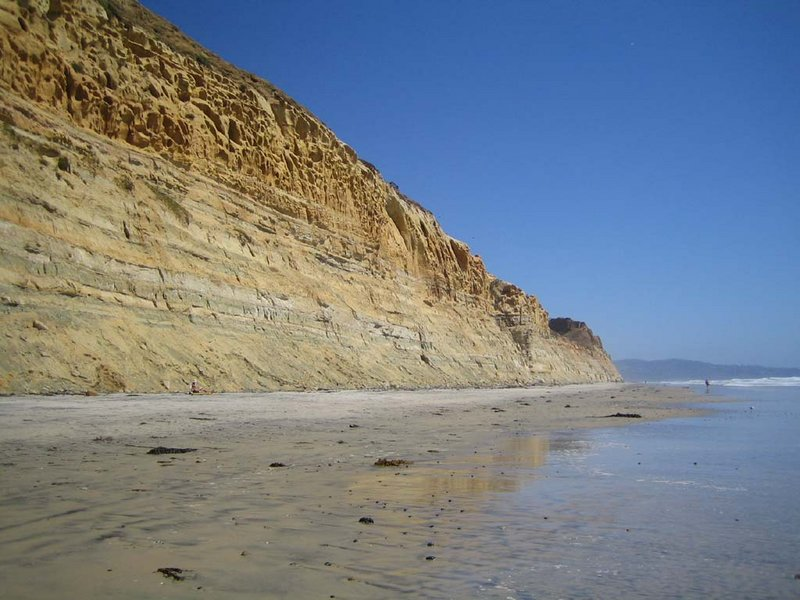
The cliffs at Black's Beach, La Jolla

These beaches are within the city limits of San Diego. The beaches are listed from north to south and are grouped by the name of the community in which they are situated. Note that names such as "Pacific Beach" and "Ocean Beach" refer to the name of communities, as well as being the names of the beaches situated within those communities.

- Torrey Pines State Beach
- La Jolla:
  - Torrey Pines City Beach
  - Black's Beach
  - La Jolla Shores
  - La Jolla Cove
  - Boomer Beach
  - Shell Beach
  - Children's Pool Beach a.k.a. Casa Beach
  - Wipeout Beach
  - Hospitals Beach
  - Whispering Sands Beach, a.k.a. Horseshoes
  - Marine Street Beach
  - Windansea
- Pacific Beach:
  - Tourmaline Surf Park
  - North Pacific Beach
  - Pacific Beach

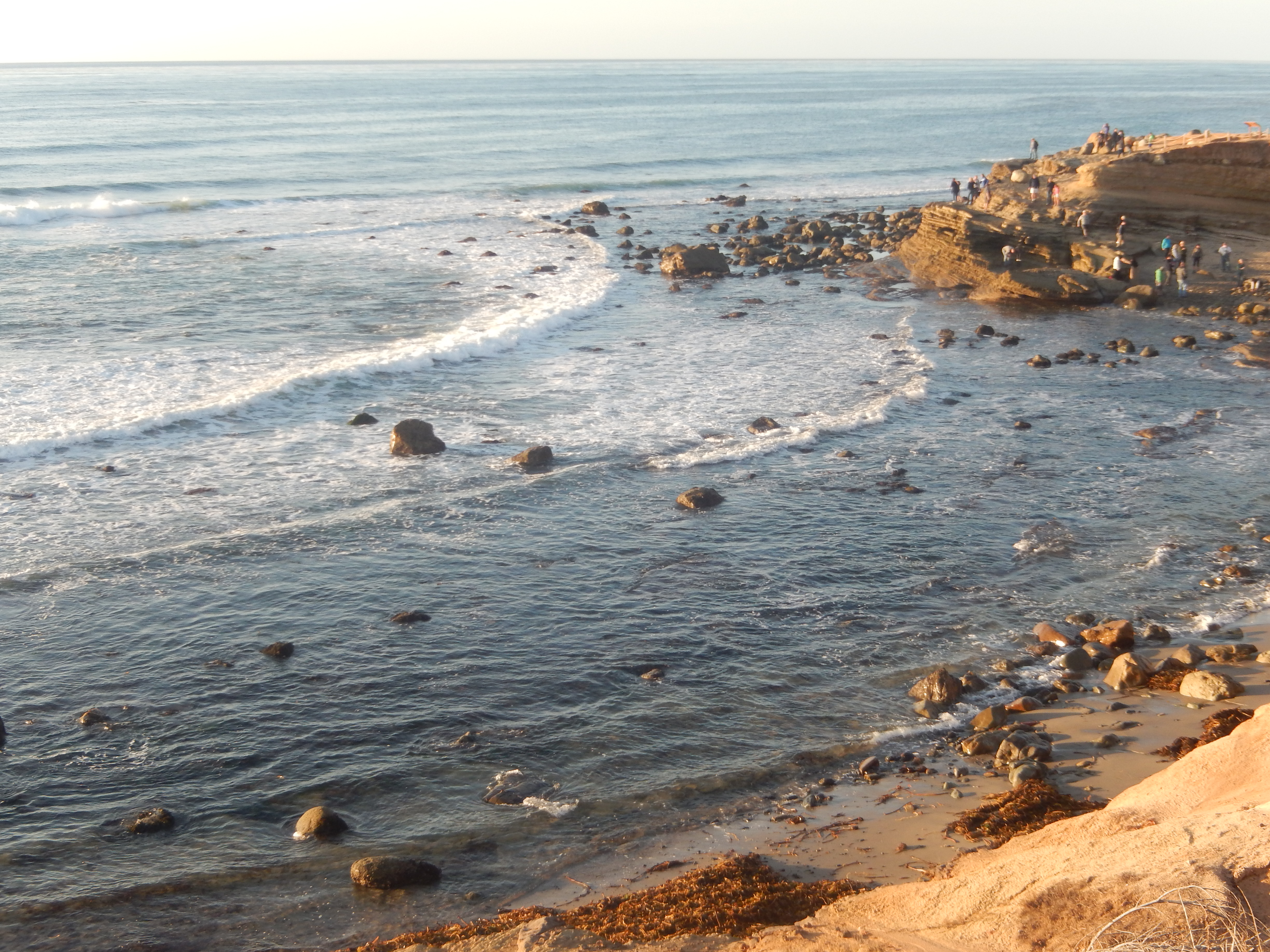
Tidepools at Cabrillo National Monument

- Mission Beach:
  - Mission Beach
  - Mission Bay and Beaches - beaches in the Bay
  - South Mission Beach
- Ocean Beach:
  - Dog Beach
  - Ocean Beach City Beach beach and fishing pier
- Sunset Cliffs
  - Sunset Cliffs
- Point Loma:
  - Cabrillo National Monument - access to tidepools

== Beaches in Coronado and South Bay ==
These beaches stretch from the mouth of San Diego Bay to the border with Tijuana, Mexico in the south.

- Coronado:
  - Coronado Central Beach
  - North Beach
  - Glorietta Bay
  - Silver Strand State Beach
  - Ferry Landing Marketplace
- Imperial Beach:
  - Imperial Beach, the pier
  - Border Field State Park

== See also ==
- List of beaches in California
