= Michael Dormer (cricketer) =

New Zealand cricketer (1937–2021)

Personal information
- Full name: Michael Edmund Francis Dormer
- Born: 22 April 1937; Lower Hutt, New Zealand
- Died: 19 April 2021 (aged 83); Loburn, New Zealand
- Batting: Right-handed
- Role: Wicket-keeper

Domestic team information
- Years: Team
- 1961/62: Auckland
- Source: Cricinfo, 19 April 2021

Michael Edmund Francis Dormer (22 April 1937 – 19 April 2021) was a New Zealand cricketer. A wicket-keeper, he played four first-class matches for Auckland in the 1961/62 season.

Dormer was educated at Nelson College and the University of Auckland. He moved to Christchurch in the 1960s, working for the ANZ Bank and then for Independent Fisheries. He also served as the representative for the Chilean Consul in New Zealand. He was the founder of the Willows Cricket Club and its ground in Loburn, North Canterbury.
