= Whistler River =

Coordinates: 43°11′S 172°08′E

Location
- Country: New Zealand

Physical characteristics
- Source
  - location: Puketeraki Range
- Mouth
  - location: Ashley River / Rakahuri
- Length: 21 km (13 mi)

The Whistler River is a river of the Canterbury region of New Zealand's South Island. It flows generally southeast from the Puketeraki Range to reach the Ashley River / Rakahuri 15 kilometres (9 mi) north of Oxford.

== See also ==
- List of rivers of New Zealand
