= Loburn =

Rural community in Canterbury, New Zealand

- Rural Area
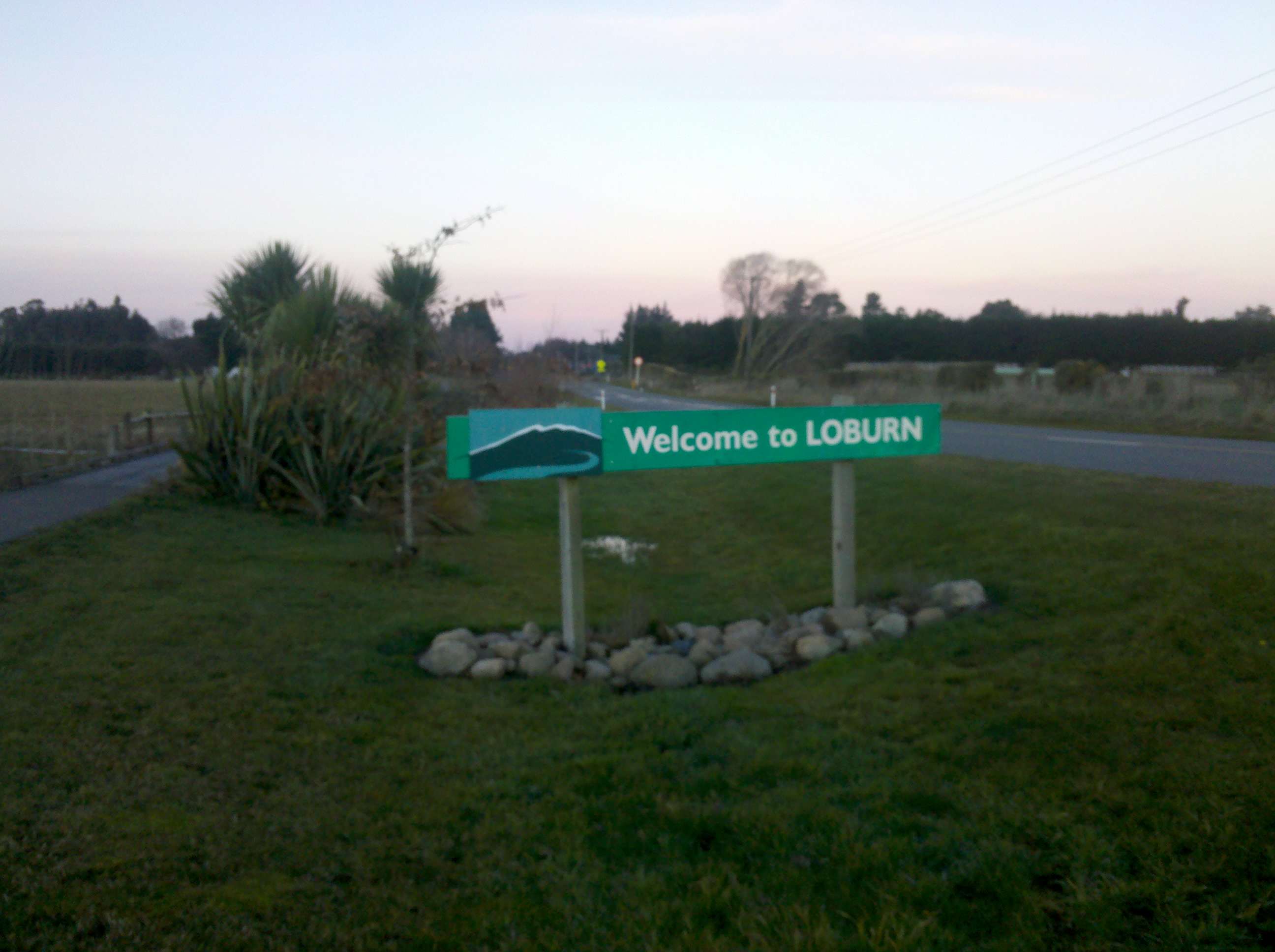
- Welcome sign to Loburn, looking east towards Loburn School (2013).
- Interactive map of Loburn
- Coordinates: 43°15′S 172°32′E
- Country: New Zealand
- Region: Canterbury
- Territorial authority: Waimakariri District
- Ward: Rangiora-Ashley Ward
- Community: Rangiora-Ashley Community
- Electorates: Kaikōura; Te Tai Tonga (Māori)

Government
  - Territorial Authority: Waimakariri District Council
  - Regional council: Environment Canterbury
  - Mayor of Waimakariri: Dan Gordon
  - Kaikōura MP: Stuart Smith
  - Te Tai Tonga MP: Tākuta Ferris

Area
  - Rural: 89.32 km^{2} (34.49 sq mi)
- Elevation (Loburn Abbey Airfield): 116 m (381 ft)

Population (June 2025)
  - Rural: 2,450
  - Density: 27.4/km^{2} (71.0/sq mi)
- Time zone: UTC+12 (NZST)
  - Summer (DST): UTC+13 (NZDT)
- Postcode: 7472
- Area code: 03

Loburn is a rural community in North Canterbury, New Zealand. It is located ten kilometres northwest of Rangiora and nearly 50 kilometres north of Christchurch.

Loburn is a small community, with no shops. Local industries include a cheese factory and orchards. Farms in the community include those raising sheep, cattle and emu.

== Geography ==
Loburn is located close to the northernmost extreme of the Canterbury Plains. It is bounded to the south and west by the Ashley and Okuku rivers, respectively. To the north it is bounded by the foothills, Mount Grey / Maukatere (933m) and Mt Karetu (972m) and bounded to the east by the Ashley forest.

The Loburn-Ashley fault zone is located from the northern banks of the Ashley River through to about Hodgsons Road in the north, it runs parallel to the Ashley river. The Loburn fault, which runs along the south side of Hodgsons Road, is responsible for various terraced abandoned stream channels, wedge structures and scarps, notably Round Hill. The topography in Loburn is generally flat with gently rolling hills, altitude gradually decreases southwards from the foothills.

== Demographics ==
The Loburn statistical area covers 89.32 km^{2} (34.49 sq mi). It had an estimated population of 2,450 as of June 2025, with a population density of 27.43 people per km^{2}.

Historical population
Year	Pop.	±% p.a.
1901	537	—
1996	1,032	+0.69%
2001	1,197	+3.01%
2006	1,338	+2.25%
2013	1,941	+5.46%
2018	2,175	+2.30%
2023	2,352	+1.58%

Loburn had a population of 2,352 in the 2023 New Zealand census, an increase of 177 people (8.1%) since the 2018 census, and an increase of 411 people (21.2%) since the 2013 census. There were 1,167 males, 1,176 females, and 9 people of other genders in 858 dwellings. 2.2% of people identified as LGBTIQ+. The median age was 49.0 years (compared with 38.1 years nationally). There were 399 people (17.0%) aged under 15 years, 339 (14.4%) aged 15 to 29, 1,215 (51.7%) aged 30 to 64, and 402 (17.1%) aged 65 or older.

People could identify as more than one ethnicity. The results were 95.5% European (Pākehā); 7.4% Māori; 1.4% Pasifika; 1.5% Asian; 0.5% Middle Eastern, Latin American and African New Zealanders (MELAA); and 3.3% other, which includes people giving their ethnicity as "New Zealander". English was spoken by 98.3%, Māori by 0.8%, Samoan by 0.3%, and other languages by 5.6%. No language could be spoken by 1.3% (e.g. too young to talk). New Zealand Sign Language was known by 0.4%. The percentage of people born overseas was 19.6, compared with 28.8% nationally.

Religious affiliations were 28.7% Christian, 0.4% Hindu, 0.1% Buddhist, 0.6% New Age, 0.1% Jewish, and 1.0% other religions. People who answered that they had no religion were 60.2%, and 9.1% of people did not answer the census question.

Of those at least 15 years old, 396 (20.3%) people had a bachelor's or higher degree, 1,179 (60.4%) had a post-high school certificate or diploma, and 378 (19.4%) people exclusively held high school qualifications. The median income was $39,000, compared with $41,500 nationally. 303 people (15.5%) earned over $100,000 compared to 12.1% nationally. The employment status of those at least 15 was 1,002 (51.3%) full-time, 360 (18.4%) part-time, and 24 (1.2%) unemployed.

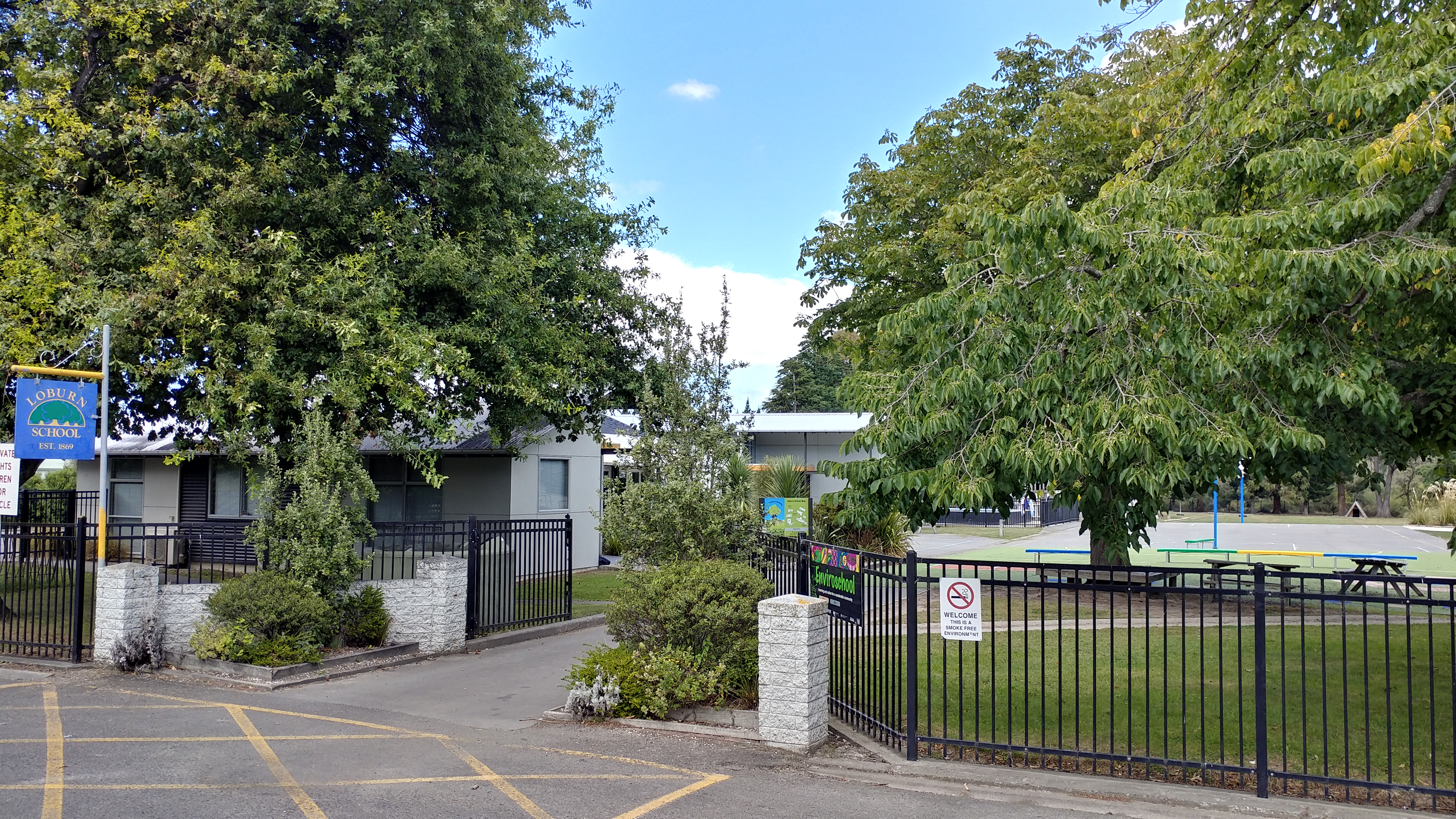
Entrance to Loburn School, 2018.

== Education ==
Loburn has two schools.

Loburn School Te Kura Aromauka (est. 1869) is a state co-educational primary school with a role of 173 students (as of July 2026).

North Loburn School (est. 1880) is a state co-educational primary school> with a role of 80 students (as of July 2026).
