= Mount Richardson (Canterbury) =

Mountain in the South Island of New Zealand

- Location within New Zealand

Highest point
- Elevation: 1,047 m (3,435 ft)
- Coordinates: 43.1800°S 172.2226°E

Geography
- Location: South Island, New Zealand
- Subdivision: Mount Thomas Forest Conservation Area

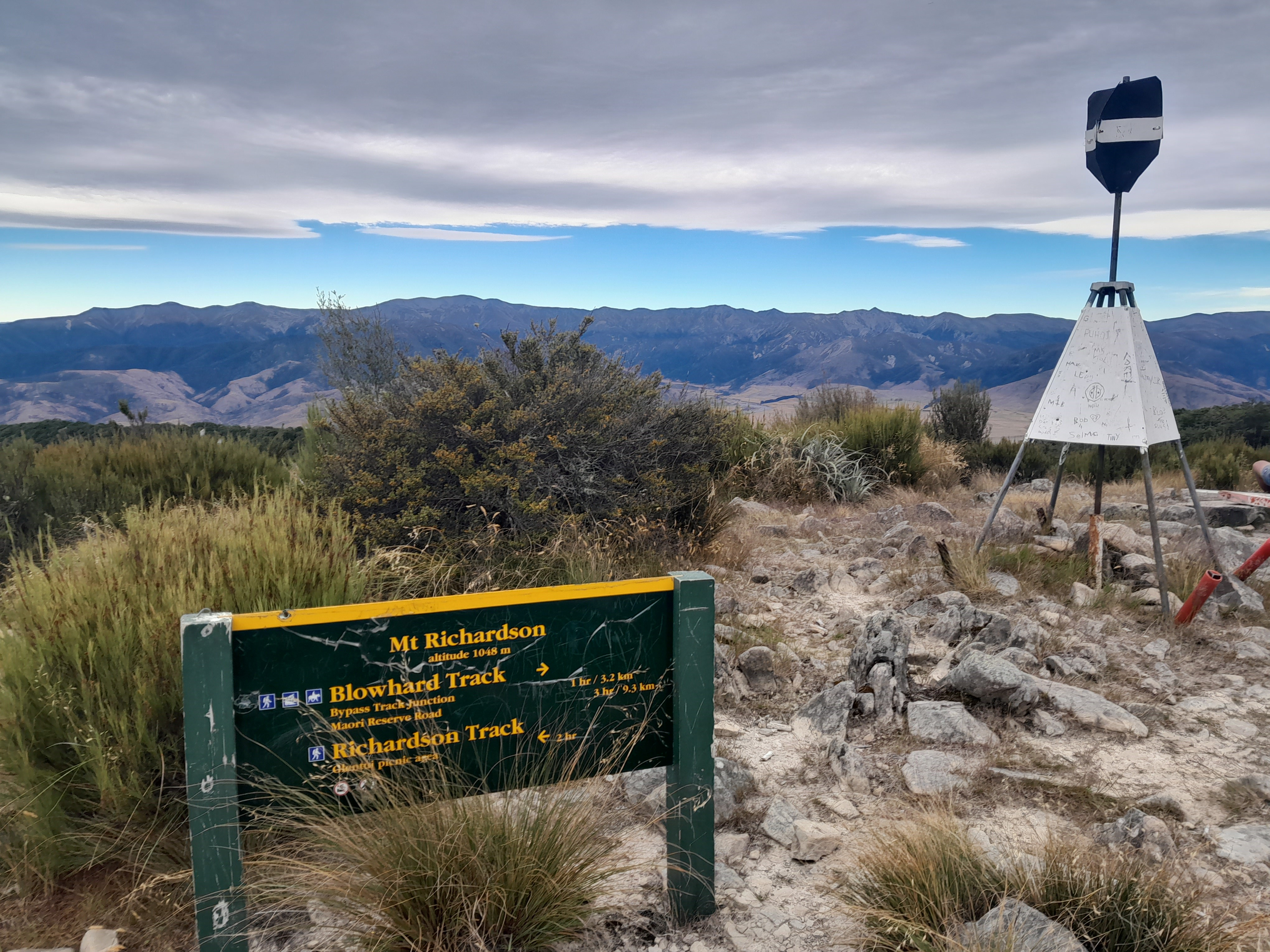
View from the top of Mount Richardson, Looking north-west.

Mount Richardson is a 1,047 m (3,435 ft) mountain in the Waimakariri District and Canterbury region of New Zealand, north of Oxford. It is served by a network of walking and tramping tracks in the Mount Thomas Forest Conservation Area, including the Richardson, Blowhard, Bypass and Glentui Loop tracks.

The Glentui River rises on the slopes of Mount Richardson and flows south-east to the Ashley River / Rakahuri.

== Recreation ==
Mount Richardson is served by a network of tracks in the Mount Thomas Forest Conservation Area. The Richardson Track starts at the Glentui picnic area at the end of Glentui Bush Road and climbs to Mt Richardson Trig. The Blowhard Track also leads to Mt Richardson Trig, but is accessed from Maori Reserve Road; the Department of Conservation notes that landowner permission is required to access the track from that road end.

The Bypass Track links the Richardson and Blowhard tracks, starting near the mid-point of Blowhard Track and descending to the Glentui Loop Track. According to DOC, the round trip from the Glentui picnic area via the Richardson, Blowhard and Bypass tracks takes 4–6 hours. The Glentui Loop Track is a 2 km (1.2 mi) loop walk from the Glentui picnic area which links with both the Bypass and Richardson tracks.

The Richardson Track climbs through tawhai forest before reaching tussock grassland and Dracophyllum scrub on the upper slopes of the mountain. The lower part of the Blowhard Track climbs a wind-swept ridge through tall open forest and emerges through stunted tawhai onto open grassland; DOC notes that skeleton tree trunks along the top ridge are remnants of a wildfire that swept up the Lees Valley in 1980. Blowhard Track is a shared-use track for trampers, mountain bikers and horse riders, but mountain biking is not permitted on the Richardson or Bypass tracks.
