= Garry River =

Coordinates: 43°15′S 172°23′E

Location
- Country: New Zealand

Physical characteristics
- Source
  - location: Mount Thomas Forest
- Mouth
  - location: Ashley River / Rakahuri

The Garry River is a river in the Canterbury region of New Zealand. It arises in the Mount Thomas Forest near Mount Thomas and flows south-east into Ashley River / Rakahuri. Blowhard Stream is a tributary.

== See also ==
- List of rivers of New Zealand
