= Shell Beach, La Jolla =

Beach in San Diego, California, US

Coordinates: 32.8489°N 117.2761°W

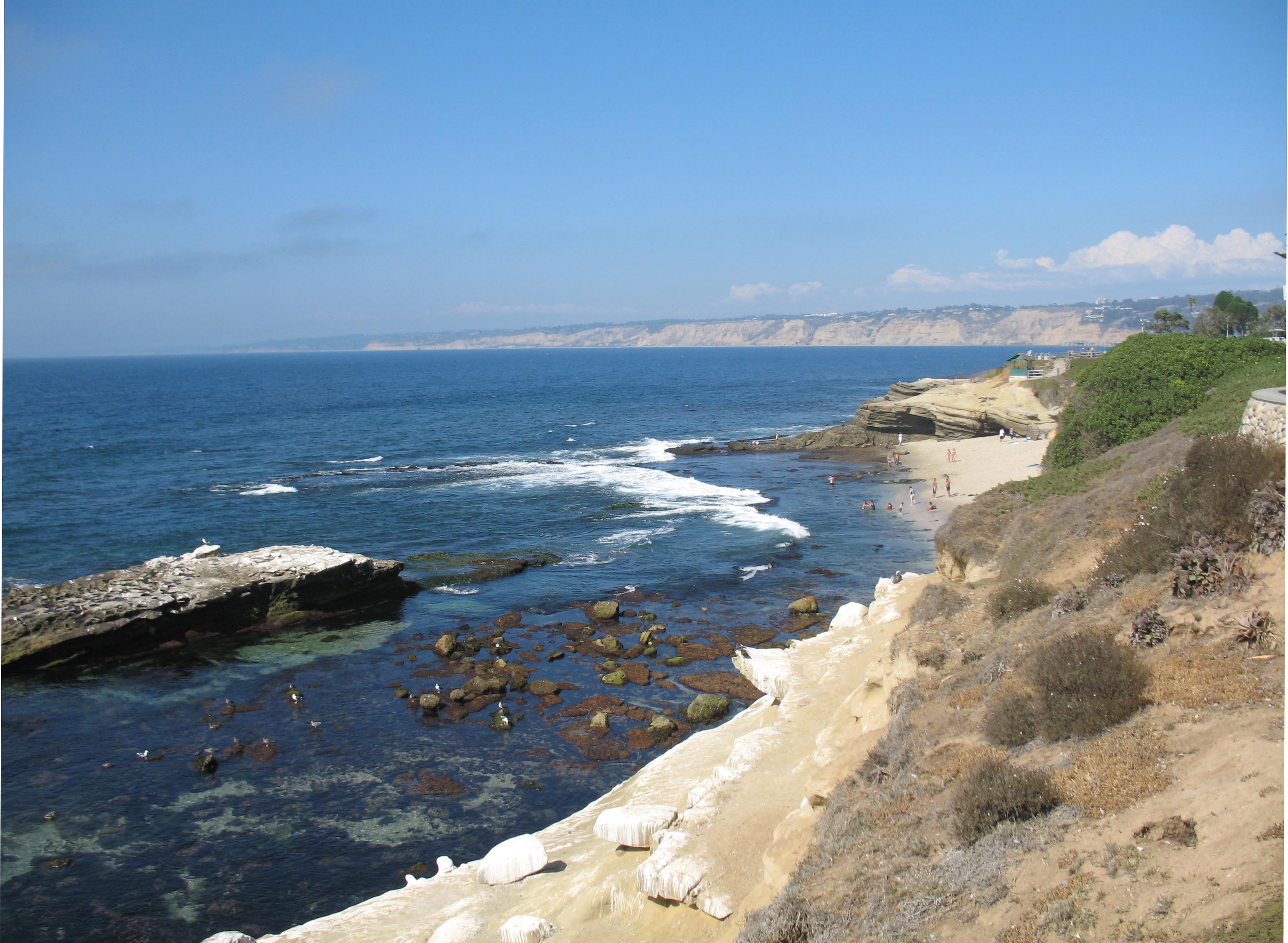
A view looking north in La Jolla, showing Seal Rock on the left and the north end of Shell Beach in the mid-distance on the right, 2007

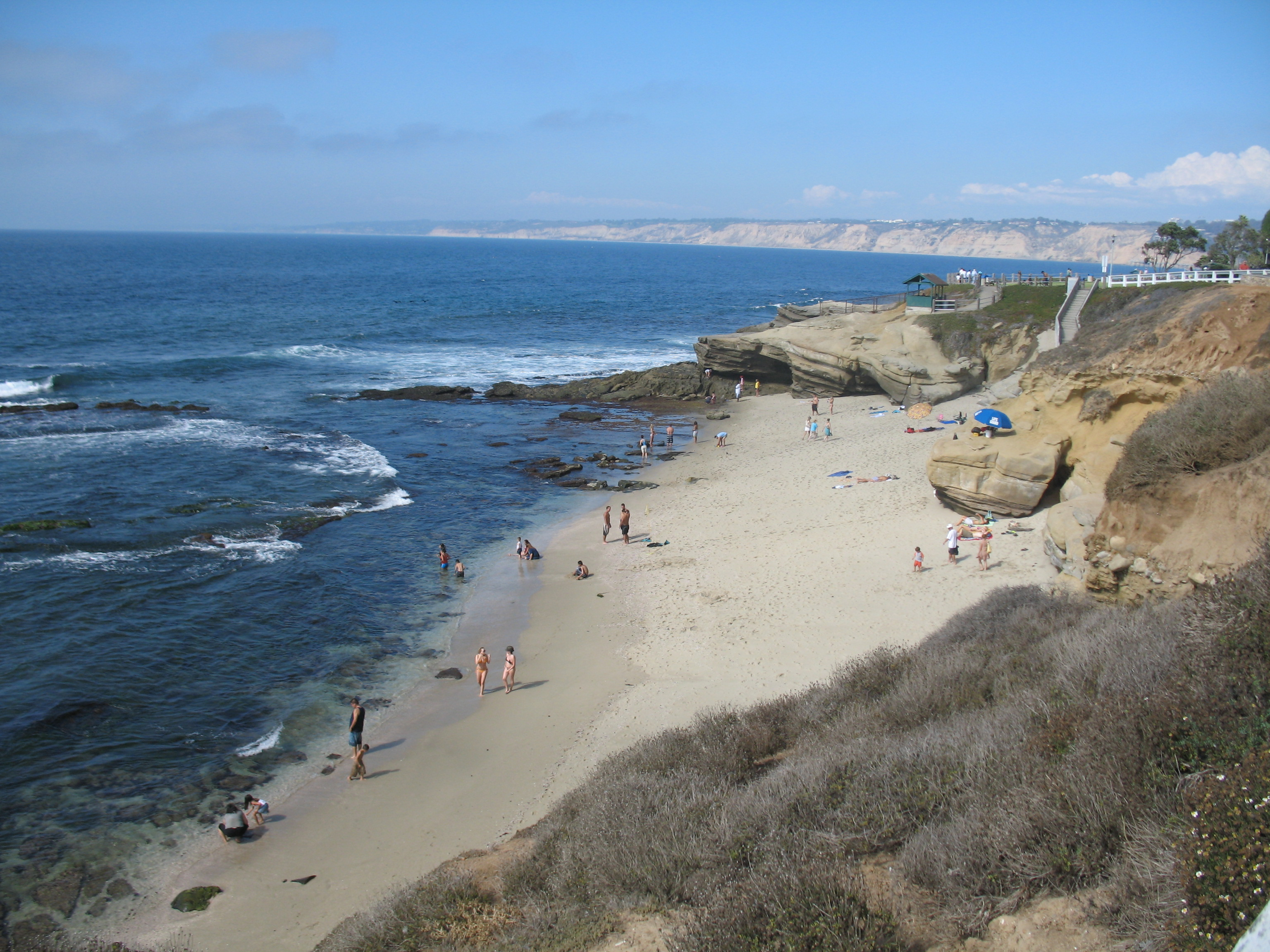
A closer view of Shell Beach, August 2007

Shell Beach is a small beach in La Jolla, a community of San Diego, California, United States. It is accessed via a flight of concrete steps that start at the south end of Ellen Browning Scripps Park. The beach is located immediately north of Children's Pool Beach, south of Boomer Beach and La Jolla Cove.

During extreme low tides, the southern end of Shell Beach has an interesting tidepool-like area, with many marine creatures visible. Because of the presence of reef structures and rip currents that can be hazardous to scuba divers, the San Diego Council of Divers provides a "Rocks, Rips and Reefs" tour for the area. Visible to the south a short distance out from Shell Beach is Seal Rock, which often has several harbor seals resting on it. There is the presence of sea glass on the beach.

== See also ==
- List of beaches in San Diego County
- List of California state parks

To the North: La Jolla Cove	California beaches	To the South; Children's Pool Beach

To the North: La Jolla Cove	California beaches	To the South; Children's Pool Beach
