= Michael Dormer (artist) =

American painter (1935–2012)

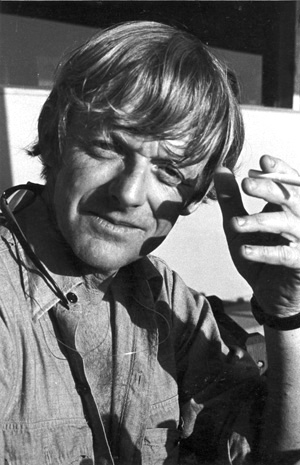
Michael Dormer

Michael Dormer or Michael Henry Dashwood Dormer (Hollywood, California, 1935 - 2012) was an American visual artist, writer, lyricist, entrepreneur and creator of the 1960s T.V. show Shrimpenstein.

== Biography ==
A childhood protégé of artist Louis Geddes, Dormer took first prize in a National Fire Prevention poster contest at age 12. Dormer studied art at San Diego State College and Chouinard Art Institute. At 18 Dormer was working in art full-time.

In 1957 Dormer established a painting studio in La Jolla and moonlighted as a night-club comic and jazz poet at the Pour House, a cabaret in Bird Rock. He also published a painting and poetry magazine titled Scavenger.

In 1968 Dormer painted his first aluminum piece; a technique he developed, which has never been used by any other artist. These pieces are part of private collections across the globe. His vast body of work includes his mid-century Crankshaft series, an extensive collection of nudes, oils, watercolors, sculpture, intricate pencil drawings, charcoals and murals.

Dormer, with his life-long friend and collaborator Lee Teacher, created a counter-culture sculpture Hot Curl, a 400-pound (180 kg) concrete statue, and installed it on the rocks near the surf shack at Windansea Beach in La Jolla in San Diego, California. The sculpture of a mop-haired, 6-foot-tall (1.8 m), knobby-kneed surfer gazed out at the sea with a beer in his hand. The pot-bellied surf god quickly became a nationwide sensation, appearing in SurfToons comics and as a plastic model kit, selling hundreds of thousands of copies. Today, Hot Curl appears regularly in Surfer magazine.

In 1964 Dormer's art was featured in the opening credits of Muscle Beach Party, which featured the first film appearance of Hot Curl and “Little” Stevie Wonder. He also doubled as a talent scout for that film and subsequent surf films, recruiting actual surfers and surfer girls off the beaches of La Jolla to serve as extras.

In 1963 Dormer and Teacher created and launched Shrimpenstein, an off-beat children's television show which aired live weekdays on Channel 9 in Los Angeles. The program, which featured a miniature Frankenstein monster, brought to life when his creator, Dr. Von Schtick, accidentally dropped a bag of jelly beans in his monster machine. The wacky adventures of the little monster, and his eccentric pals, enchanted, with double entendre, and wit fit for children and adults, grew a great following. Frank Sinatra and his Rat Pack sought out Dormer to tell him they never missed an episode.

In the early 1970s Dormer and his wife Flicka lived in Florence, Italy. While there, Dormer began experimenting with holographic photography. The City of Florence later used his methods as an aid in restoring artworks.

Dormer lived in Ocean Beach in San Diego, California.

Michael Dormer died at home in Ocean Beach, San Diego, California on 10 September 2012.
