= Windansea Beach =

Beach in California, United States

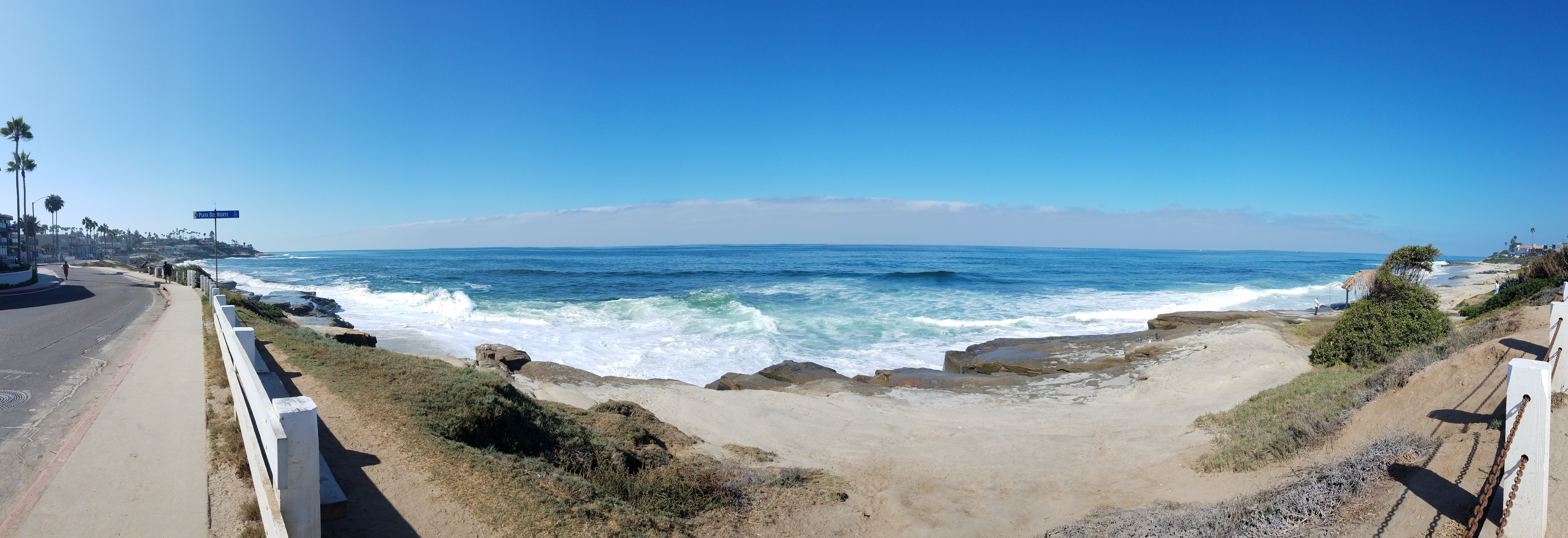
- Panoramic photograph of Windansea Beach in 2018
- Interactive map of Windansea Beach
- Location: San Diego, California
- Coordinates: 32°49′52″N 117°16′52″W

Windansea Beach is a stretch of coastline in the La Jolla community of San Diego, California. The neighborhood adjacent to the beach is named Windansea after the beach. It is named after the 1909 oceanfront Strand Hotel that was renamed "Windansea" Hotel in 1919 after the owner Arthur Snell ran a "naming contest". The Windansea Hotel which was located on Neptune Avenue between Playa del Sur and Playa del Norte burned down in 1943. Geographically, it is defined by the beachfront extending north of Palomar Avenue and south of Westbourne Street.

== Surf breaks ==
The main peak at Windansea is a reef break with surf that breaks at the shoreline. During the winter months, Windansea can have six-to-eight foot surf. Other breaks in the vicinity of Windansea include Middles, Turtles, Simmons (named after Bob Simmons who died at that break in 1954) and Big Rock.

Waves at Windansea break "harder and faster" than at nearby beaches like La Jolla Shores. The presence of surf beginners in the water may disturb the stricter surfing etiquette observed in more treacherous terrains.

== The Windansea Shack ==
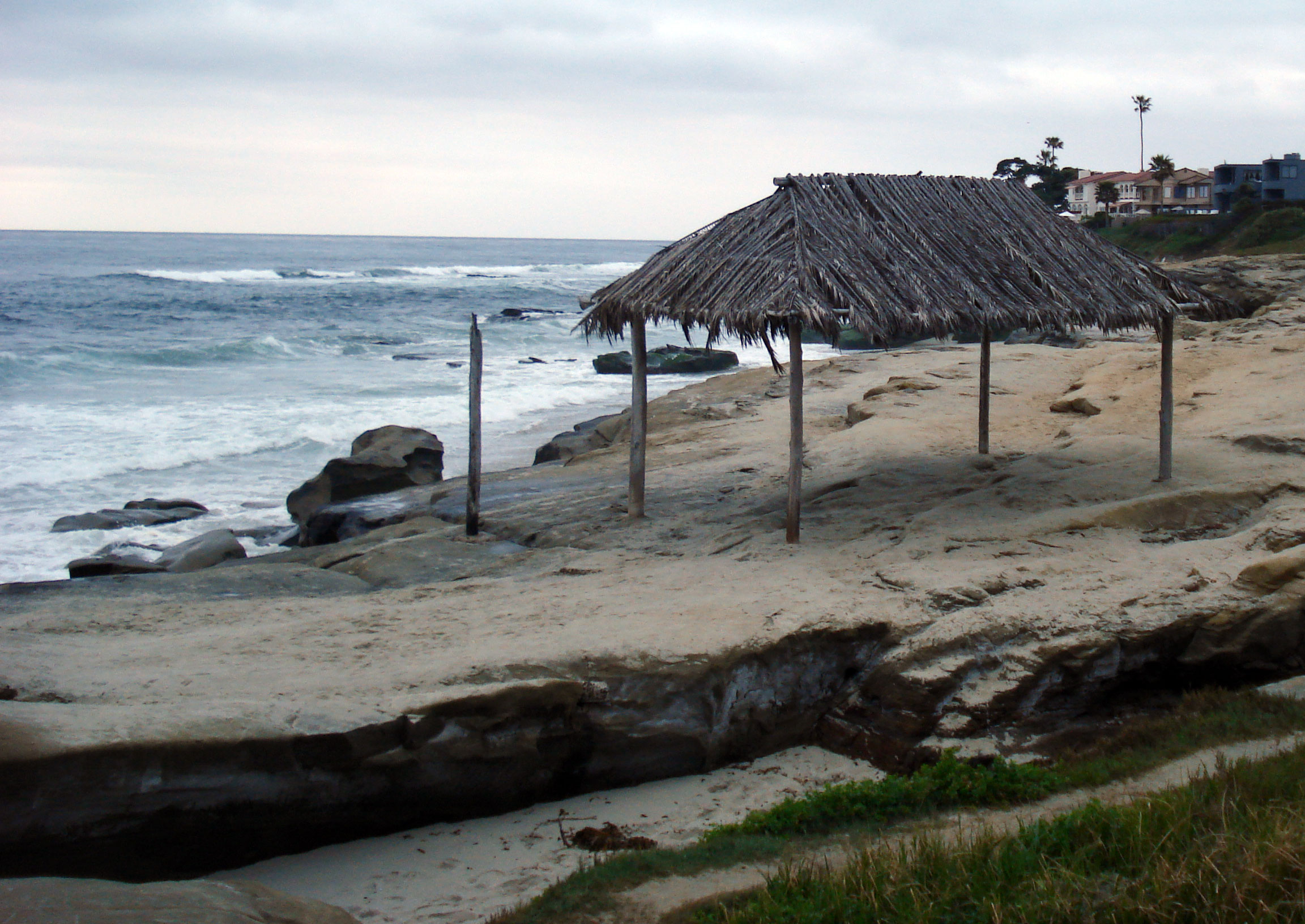
The Surf Shack at Windansea Beach in 2008

The distinguishing landmark at Windansea is a palm-covered shack that was originally constructed in 1947 by Woody Ekstrom, Fred Kenyon, Don Okey and a few others. It was constructed as a shady area to prevent the wax from melting off surfers’ boards and to protect their families from the sun. At first, it was made with small eucalyptus branches gathered from the old Scripps Health and then in 1950 bigger branches gathered from Camp Matthews, (which later became UC San Diego) and palm fronds, despite eucalyptus’ instability as a construction material.

It was moved inland about 2 feet in 2003 when it was rebuilt after a major storm, and over the years the palm fronds replaced but its orientation has remained the same.

"The Surf Shack at Windansea Beach" was designated as an historical landmark by the San Diego Historical Resources Board on May 27, 1998. The shack was struck down by a large storm in 2003, rebuilt, and large waves knocked it down again during a high tide on December 24, 2015, but it was once again rebuilt by locals in June 2016. In 2017, a plaque was attached to the shack that reads: “Historical Landmark 358, The Surf Shack WindanSea Beach built by returning World War II surfers in 1947 for shade and aloha.” In 2022, it was replaced by a permanent plaque that read "a quintessential embodiment of surfing culture associated worldwide with Southern California, and the oldest continuously used shelter of its kind on the West Coast."

A nearby drainage pipe was painted on the inside to look like the inside of a barrel with a direct view of the iconic shack.

== Parking lot and public facilities ==
The Windansea parking lot is located along Neptune Place, between Nautilus and Bonair Streets. Although recently upgraded by the City of San Diego, it offers a limited number of parking spaces. Street parking is typically widely available. There are no drinking fountains, showers or public restrooms available.

== Surfing history ==
Windansea enjoys a storied reputation as a surfbreak, and has served as home break to many notable surfers, including Mickey Munoz and Butch Van Artsdalen. Steve Pezman, former publisher of Surfer magazine and current publisher of The Surfer's Journal, called Windansea locals in the early 1960s "the heaviest surf crew ever."

The Windansea Surf and Ski Club was founded in 1947 but did not exist for long.

In 1960, following city-wide strife between homeowners and surfers, Windansea was designated as one of the six official “surfing beaches” in San Diego. Further ordinances restricting surfing to specific beaches were dropped by 1961.

The Windansea Surf Club was founded by Chuck Hasley in the summer of 1963 in preparation for the Malibu International surf competition. Founding members such as The Endless Summer star and first Vice President Mike Hynson and Skip Frye.

In 1963, Michael Dormer and Lee Teacher built a six foot, 400 pound version of their Hot Curl cartoon character out of cement, iron, a mop, a light bulb, and a beer can. The statue appeared on the rocks over Windansea beach in La Jolla, holding a beer in one hand while gazing out over the ocean in search of the perfect wave. In 1964 Hot Curl was featured in "Muscle Beach Party" starring Frankie Avalon, Annette Funicello, Buddy Hackett, and Don Rickles.

== Surf gangs ==
During the 1960s, the beach was sometimes a little rowdy with surfers drinking on the beach. The police would usually stand at the top of the railing stairs of the beach to intercept intoxicated people, hence the nickname "penalty box" of the upper stairs area.

The surf gang Windansea Surf Rats was active for decades on the Windansea beach, intimidating outsiders from surfing on their beach. For many years, the break was notoriously exclusive, with non-locals or younger surfers facing harassment, intimidation, or violence, but by the 1990s, this had decreased. In 2007, the professional surfer Emery Kauanui Jr. was beaten to death at his home by a surf gang called the Bird Rock Bandits. The trial aimed first at determining if the incriminated group acted as an organized gang or not.

== In popular culture ==
The title article in Tom Wolfe's book of essays, The Pump House Gang, is about a group of surfers from Windansea Beach who "attended the Watts riots as if it were the Rose Bowl game in Pasadena."

The title of the song "Wind 'an' Sea" by La Jolla Christian rock band Dakoda Motor Co. from their 1993 album Into the Son takes its name from the community.

== See also ==
- List of beaches in San Diego County
- List of California state parks
- Bill Andrews (photographer)
- La Jolla Historical Society

To the North: Marine Street Beach	California beaches	To the South; Tourmaline Surfing Park
