= Mount Richardson (Southland) =

Hill in New Zealand

- Location within New Zealand

Highest point
- Elevation: 540 m (1,770 ft)
- Coordinates: 44.485°S 167.918°E

Geography
- Location: South Island, New Zealand

Mount Richardson is in northern Fiordland, in the Southland District of New Zealand, in the southwestern part of the country. The summit is 485 metres (1,591 ft) above sea level. The terrain around Mount Richardson is hilly to the northwest, and mountainous to the southeast.

The highest point in the area is Te Hau, 1,703 metres above sea level, 7.9 km south of Mount Richardson. Less than two people per square kilometre live around Mount Richardson. There is no town in the area. Mount Richardson is almost completely covered in forest. The hill is named after John Richardson, who was the third Superintendent of Otago Province.

The average rainfall 2,920 millimetres per year. The wettest month is October, with 356 millimetres of rain, and the wettest February, with 152 millimetres.

Viewfinder Panoramas, within a 10 kilometre radius. The full algorithm is available here.
