= Karetu River (Northland) =

Coordinates: 35°21′19″S 174°06′54″E

Location
- Country: New Zealand
- Region: Northland Region

Physical characteristics
- Source
  - location: Russell Forrest
- Mouth
  - location: Kawakawa River

The Karetu River is located in the Northland Region of New Zealand, approximately 47 kilometres (29 mi) north of Whangārei. Its source is on the north-western slopes of the 407-metre (1,335 ft) hill Te Rangi in the Russell Forest.

The river begins as two streams, Whakatane Stream and Karetu Stream, which join and flow down the Whaakaurau Valley through the settlement of Karetu. From here it becomes the Karetu River, and joins the Kawakawa River shortly before reaching the Bay of Islands.

== See also ==
- List of rivers of New Zealand
