= Ashley River / Rakahuri =

River in New Zealand

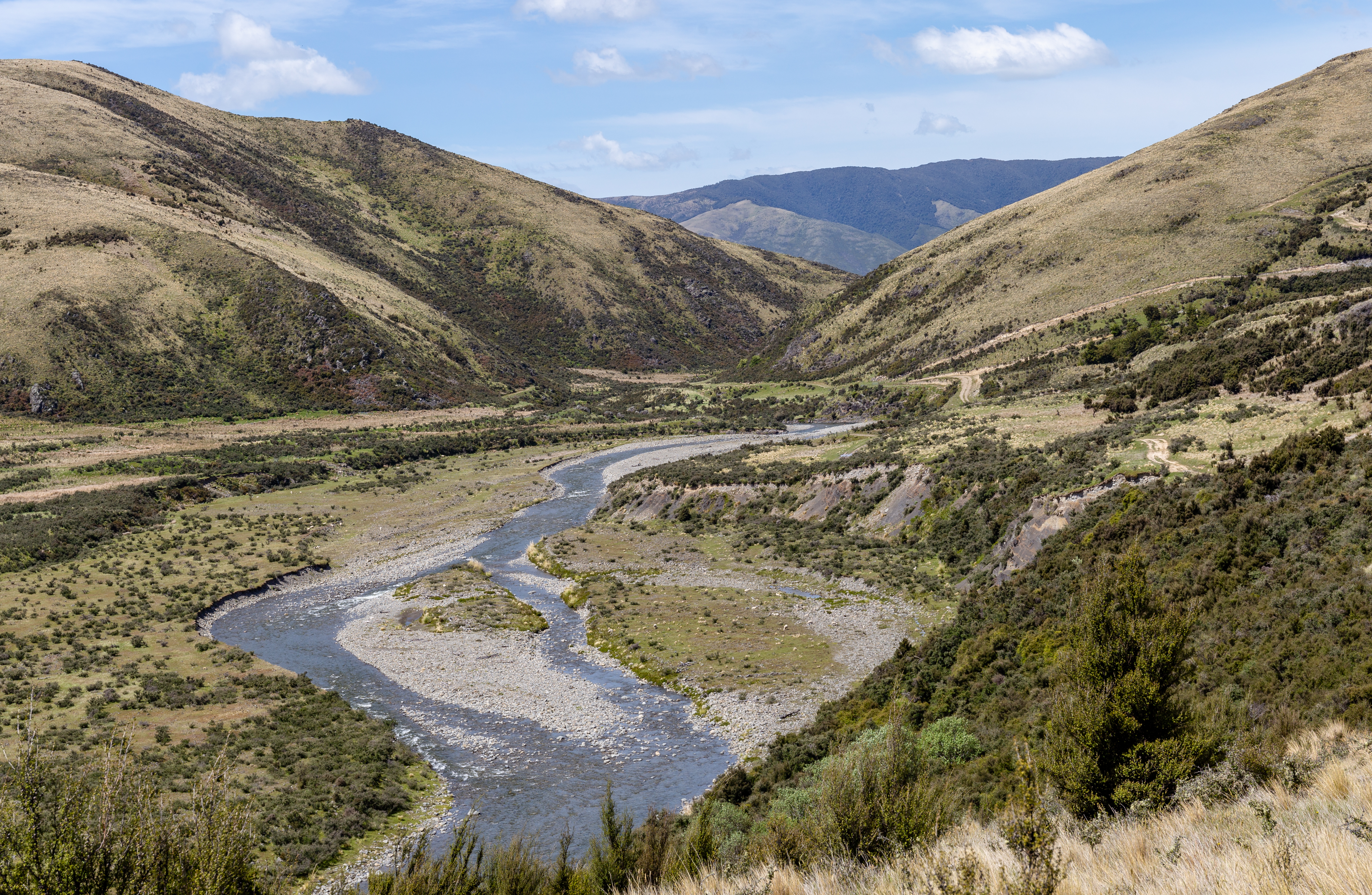
- Native name: Rakahuri (Māori)

Location
- Country: New Zealand
- Region: Canterbury

Physical characteristics
- Source: Puketeraki Range
  - elevation: 1,802 m (5,912 ft)
- Mouth: Pacific Ocean
  - location: Waikuku Beach
  - coordinates: 43°16′S 172°43′E
  - elevation: 0 m
- Length: 65 km (40 mi)
- Basin size: 1,200 km^{2} (460 sq mi)

Basin features
- Tributaries
  - left: Glentui River, Garry River, Okuku River, Makerikeri River
  - right: Lilburne River, Whistler River, Townshend River

The Ashley River (Māori: Rakahuri; officially Ashley River / Rakahuri) is in the Canterbury region of New Zealand. It flows generally southeastwards for 65 kilometres (40 mi) before entering the Pacific Ocean at Waikuku Beach, Pegasus Bay north of Christchurch. The town of Rangiora is close to the south bank of the Ashley River. The river's official name was changed from Ashley River to the dual name Ashley River / Rakahuri by the Ngāi Tahu Claims Settlement Act 1998.

Though the lower reaches of the river are braided, part of the upper river flows through a canyon known as the Ashley Gorge.

The river emanates from mountains in the west Lees Valley adjacent to Island Hills station and exits the hills at a gorge near Oxford township. It has tributaries of Duck Creek in this valley and is an accumulator of watershed between Lees Valley and Oxford township.

Behind Waikuku Beach is one of the largest, least modified estuaries in New Zealand. It is abundant in bird life, including the wrybill (Anarhynchus frontalis) and Black stilt (Himantopus novaezelandiae). Many migratory birds over-winter here. Surveys from 2000 to 2015, after work to clear weeds and pests, showed significant increases in banded dotterel, wrybill, black-fronted tern, and pied stilt, but black-billed gull, spur-winged plover and southern black-backed gull didn't change significantly.

== Floods ==
In February 1868, June 1905 and May 1923 flooding from this river extended as far as Kaiapoi. Major floods also occurred in March 1902, February 1936, March 1941, February 1945, January 1953, December 1993 and 2013. 34.7 km (21.6 mi) of stopbanks have been built from the 1930s and have contained the floods since 1953, being enlarged in 1976 and 2018. On the north bank they extend from the railway bridge to the coast and on the south bank to Mount Thomas Road.

== Bridges ==
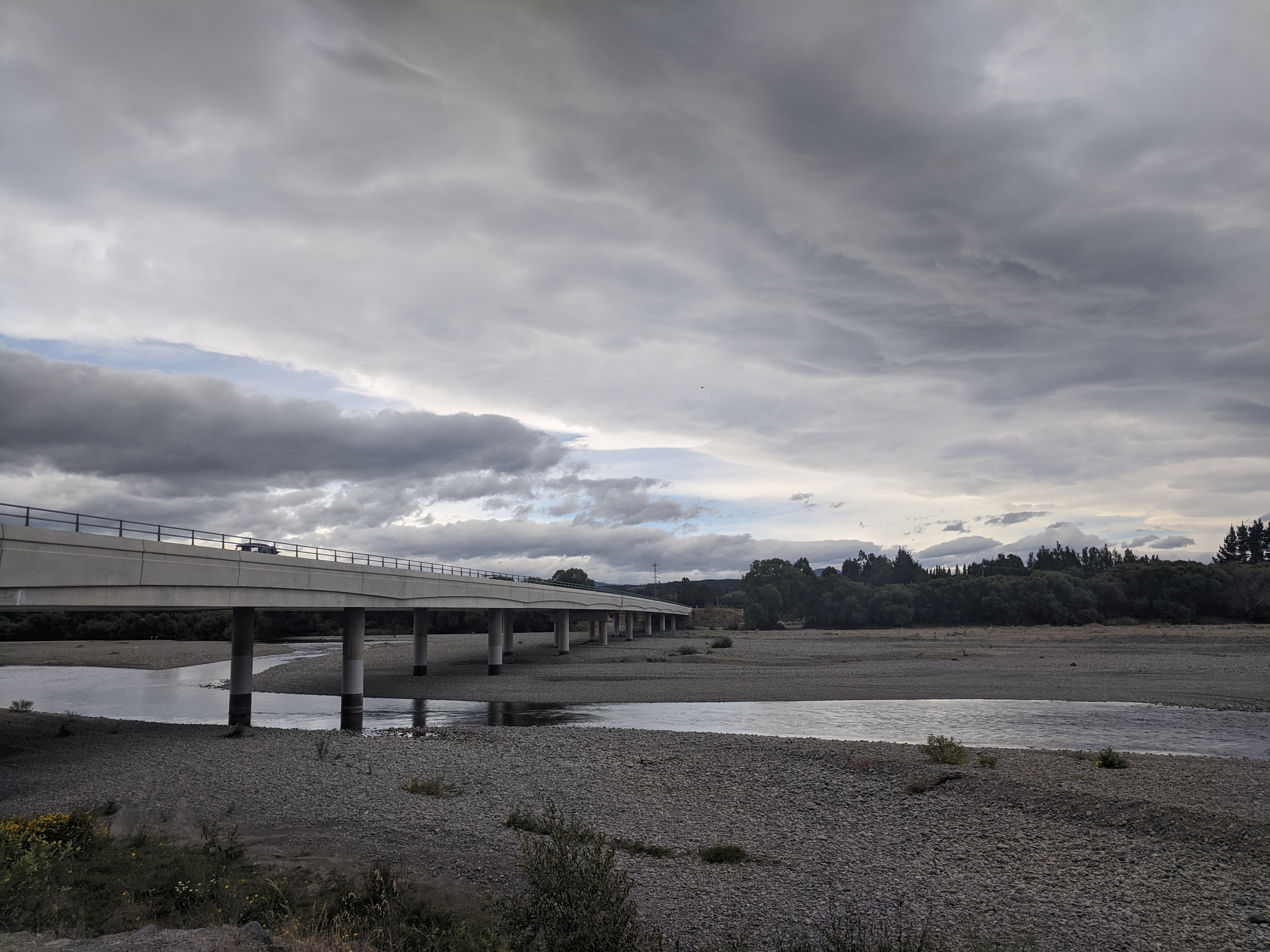
Cones Road Bridge from south in 2019

Along its length, several bridges cross the Ashley River / Rakahuri. Three of these are in the remote headwaters of the river and the Lees Valley, where Lees Valley road crosses the river three times. A further bridge sits at Ashley Gorge, where the river enters the Canterbury Plains from the foothills, forming part of the Inland Scenic Route.

=== Main North Road Bridge ===
The first bridge was completed in 1866. It was initially a toll bridge, but by 1867 had been bought by the Provincial Council. After floods, it was lengthened in 1868. It was rebuilt 10 ch (660 ft; 200 m) downstream and 1,190 ft (360 m) long by 22 ft (6.7 m) wide, on 25 reinforced concrete spans, opening in August 1937, after flood damage in 1936. Floods had also closed it in 1870, It is now part of State Highway 1 and was repaired and strengthened in 2019.

=== Railway Bridge ===
The bridge opened with the Rangiora to Ashley section of the Northern Railway on 17 April 1875. It was 3,055 ft (931 m) long and built of timber, with 54 spans. In April 1951 a pier and two iron girders were washed away in a flood. It was replaced by a 549 m (1,801 ft) bridge to the east on 18 December 1961.

=== Cones Road Bridge ===
The Cones Road Bridge is located at 43.2822°S 172.5854°E and connects Rangiora to Ashley and Loburn. It is a 10-span, 300 m (980 ft) long bridge, opened in 2015, replacing a 24-span, 1912 bridge, after closure by floods in 2013. It is built of hollow-core concrete beams and has 2 road lanes, 2 cycleways and a footpath. The original bridge was built in 1897.

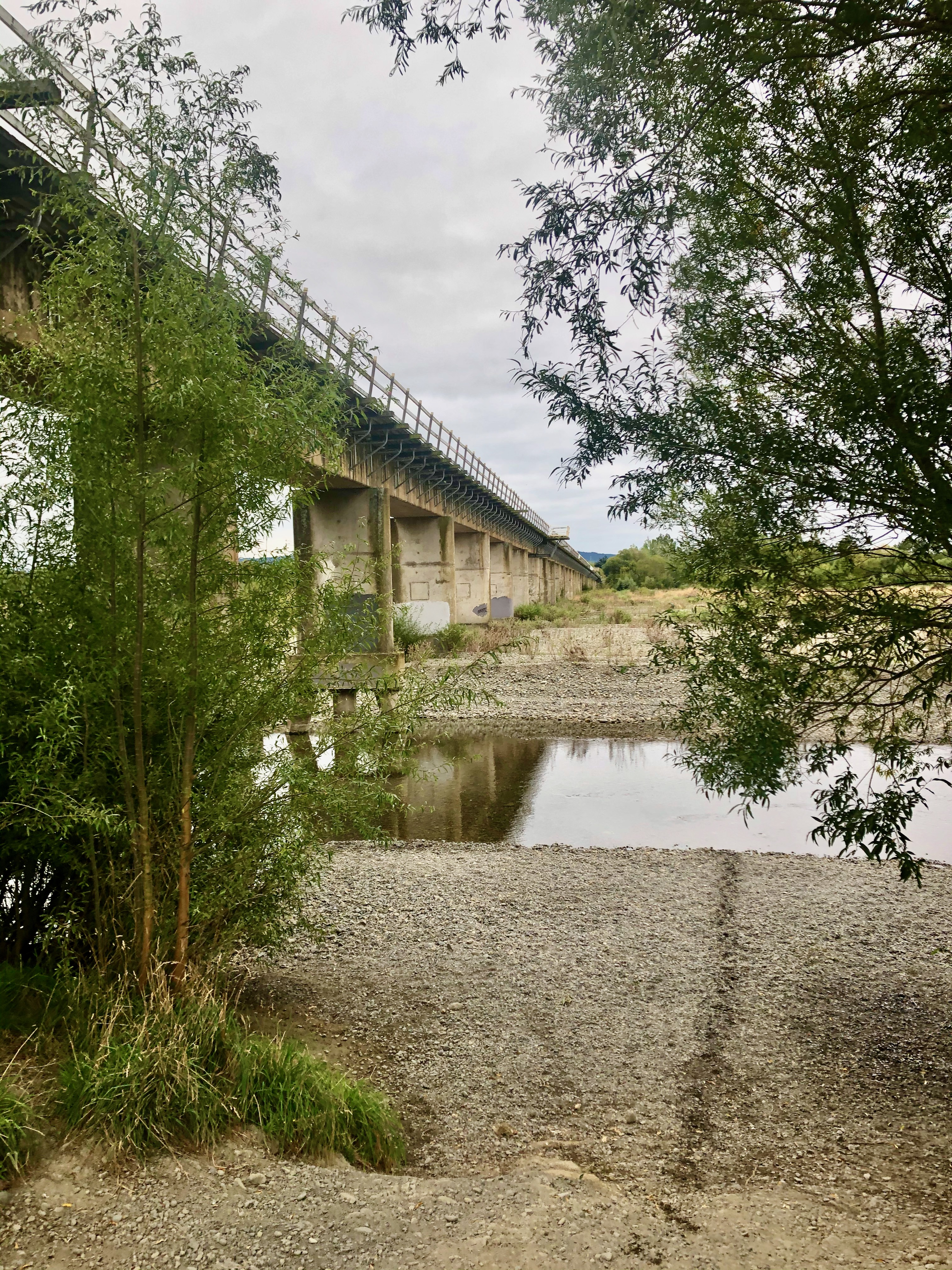
Railway Bridge from south in 2021
