= Okuku River =

River in Canterbury, New Zealand

Coordinates: 43°16′S 172°28′E

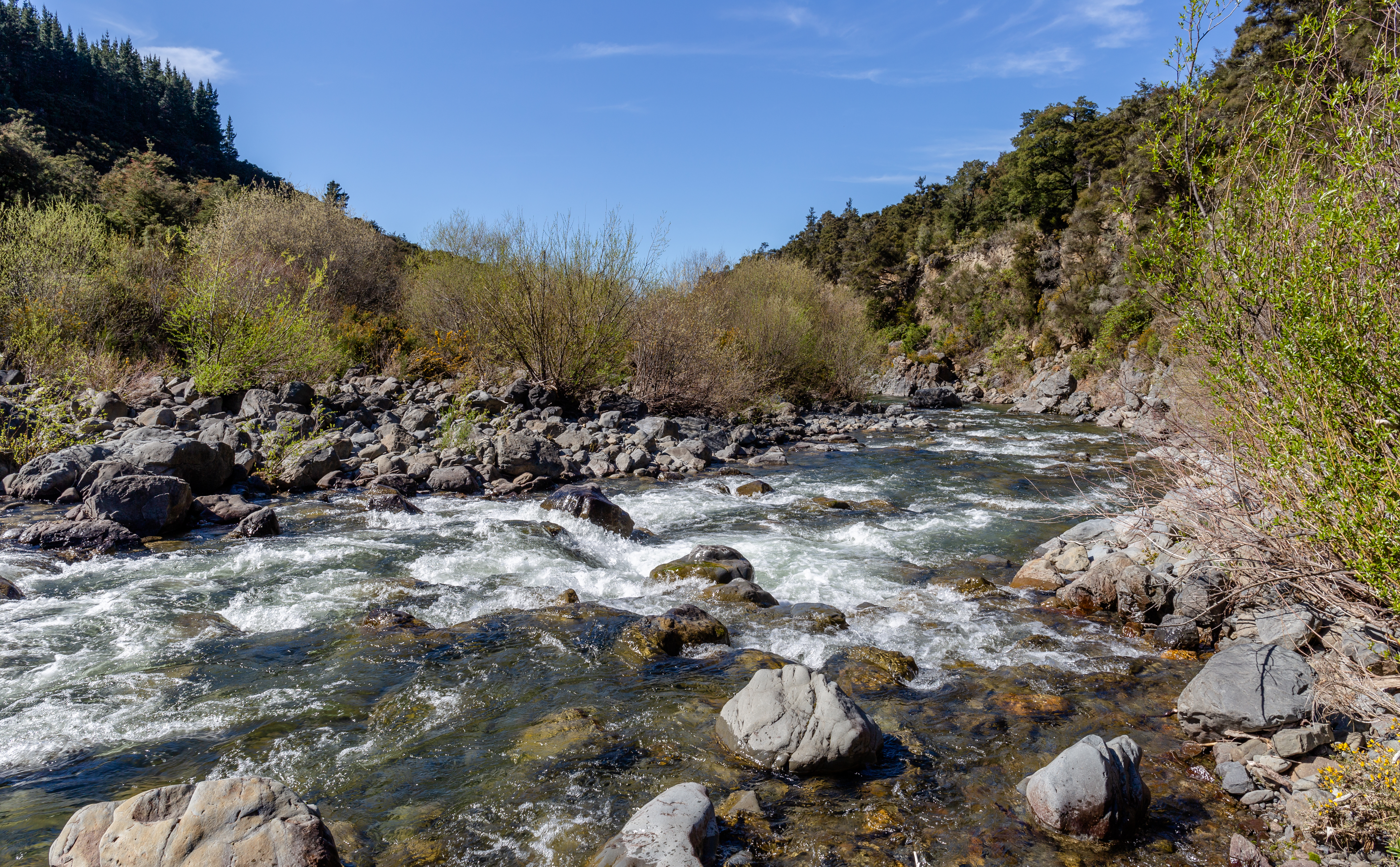

Location
- Country: New Zealand

Physical characteristics
- Source
  - location: Puketeraki Range
- Mouth
  - location: Ashley River / Rakahuri
- Length: 42 km (26 mi)

The Okuku River is a river of the north Canterbury region of New Zealand's South Island. It flows predominantly south from several sources in and close to the eastern edge of the Puketeraki Range west of Waikari, flowing through a steep gorge in the Okuku Range before flowing into the Ashley River / Rakahuri 20 kilometres (12 mi) east of Oxford.

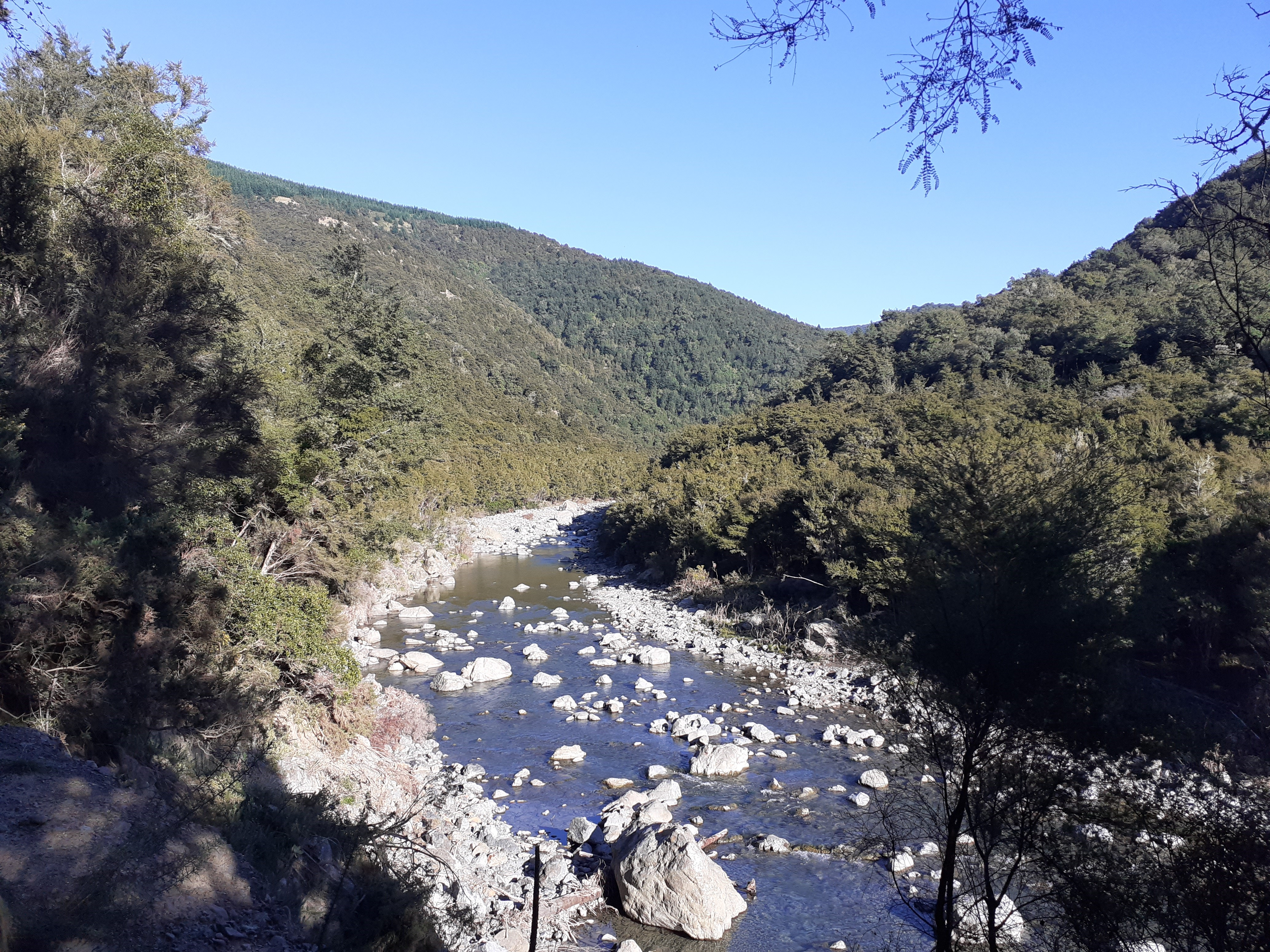
Okuku River

Pinchgut hut is located next to the Okuku river.

== See also ==
- List of rivers of New Zealand
