= List of San Diego Historic Landmarks =

This is a list of San Diego Historic Landmarks. In 1967, the City of San Diego established a Historical Resources Board with the authority to designate and protect landmarks from inappropriate alterations. In total, the city has designated more than 1,000 structures or other properties as Historic Landmarks. Many of the properties have also received recognition at the federal level by inclusion on the National Register of Historic Places or by designation as National Historic Landmarks.

== Listing of San Diego Historic Landmarks ==
SDHL #	Landmark name	Image	Address	Designation Date	Description
1	El Prado Area		Balboa Park; 32°43′52″N 117°9′7″W	9/7/1967	Long, wide promenade running through the center of Balboa Park, lined with Spanish Revival buildings including the Museum of Us, the San Diego Museum of Art, the Museum of Photographic Arts, the Natural History Museum, the Fleet Science Center, and the Timken Museum of Art
2	Old Mission Dam & Flume (Padre Dam)		Mission Trails Park, Fr. Serra Trail; 32°50′24″N 117°2′32″W	2/1/1968	The first major irrigation project on the Pacific coast, this stone and cement dam was used for a sawmill and irrigation at Mission San Diego de Alcalá; now part of Mission Trails Regional Park, the largest municipal park in California
3	Fort Stockton		Presidio Park, Old Town	February 15, 1968	Site fortified by Carlos Carrillo in 1828; named Fort Stockton and became headquarters for ending the Californio revolt of 1847
4	Presidio of San Diego Site		Presidio Park; 32°45′31″N 117°11′36″W	February 29, 1968	Fort established by Spanish forces in 1769 was the first permanent European settlement on the Pacific Coast; the first of the presidios and base of operations for the Spanish colonization of California
5	Calvary Cemetery Site		Pioneer Park, Mission Hills	February 29, 1968	Part of Pioneer Park in Mission Hills, it was in use between 1875 and 1919; converted from a cemetery to a public park in the early 1970s
6	New San Diego (Dunnell's)		348 W. "F" St.	January 23, 1969	
7	Pantoja Park		Downtown, Marina district	January 23, 1969	Built in 1850, it is the oldest park in downtown San Diego; located on G Street at India Street.
8	Sherman-Gilbert House		Heritage Park, Old Town	8/7/1969	Stick Eastlake house with "widow's walk" and circular window; moved to Heritage Park in Old Town in 1971 through the efforts of Save Our Heritage Organisation
9	Davis-Horton House		410 Island Ave, Gaslamp Qtr.	11/2/1969	
10	Torrey Pines Area		Torrey Pines State Natural Reserve	November 21, 1969	Coastal park La Jolla, it remains one of the wildest stretches of land (8 km^{2}) on the Southern California coast; consists of a plateau with cliffs that overlook Torrey Pines State Beach, and a lagoon used by migrating seabirds
11	Villa Montezuma		1925 K St. 32°42′29.26″N 117°8′45.88″W	2/6/1970	Victorian mansion built in 1887 by musician, spiritualist and author Jesse Shepard (later known as Francis Grierson)
12	San Pasqual Battlefield Site		San Pasqual Valley	11/6/1970	Site where, in 1846, Stephen W. Kearny's US Army column battled the Californios, and their Presidial Lancers, led by General Don Andrés Pico; now the San Pasqual Valley community
13	Montgomery Memorial		Bounded by Palm Ave, Beyer Blvd, and Coronado Ave	11/6/1970	Park honoring John Joseph Montgomery whose 1883 glider flown at Otay Mesa was the first successful flight of a heavier-than-air craft; monument in the shape of a wing marks the event and symbolizes his continued flights in the region during 1884–1886
14	Old Town San Diego State Historic Park		Jct. of US 5 and US 80; 32°45′15″N 117°11′47″W	11/6/1970	State historic park preserves and recreates San Diego's old town, from shortly after the Mexican War of Independence during its pueblo Alta California period beginning in 1821, through the Bear Flag Revolt, the American period, and ending in 1872, 22 years after statehood
14A	Casa de Estudillo		4000 Mason St., Old Town; 32°45′14″N 117°11′45″W	11/6/1970	Adobe house constructed in 1827 by José María Estudillo and his son José Antonio, early settlers of San Diego, was considered one of the finest houses in Mexican California
14B	Casa de Cota		NW corner of Twiggs and Congress, Old Town	11/6/1970	Built in 1835, removed in 1942.
14C	Casa de Bandini		2660 Calhoun St., Old Town	11/6/1970	Large U-shaped house built in 1829 by Juan Bandini; later converted to use as a store and, in 1869, the Cosmopolitan Hotel
14D	Casa de Pedrorena		2616 San Diego Ave., Old Town	11/6/1970	
14E	Casa de Machado-Silvas (de la Bandera)		2741 San Diego Ave., Old Town	11/6/1970	
14F	Congress Hall Site		426 Calhoun St. & 408 Wallace St., Old Town	December 6, 1932	Demolished in 1939
14G	Casa de Machado-Stewart		2724 Congress St., Old Town	11/6/1970	
14H	Mason Street School		3960 Mason St., Old Town	11/6/1970	
14I	The Exchange Hotel Site		San Diego Ave (Southside facing Plaza), Old Town		Lost in an April 1872 fire
15	Chapel of the Immaculate Conception		3950 Conde Street, Old Town	11/6/1970	Other than the San Diego Mission, the oldest church in San Diego; built in the 1850s as a home; converted to a church by Don Jose Antonio Aguirre in 1858; the fictional lovers in the novel "Ramona" were married here
16	Whaling Station Site		Ballast Point Peninsula	11/6/1970	Shore station where whale blubber was boiled down for the oil in the 1850s and 1860s, halfway out on the inner beach of Ballast Point
17	Lighthouse of 1854		Cabrillo National Monument	11/6/1970	Lighthouse built at the mouth of San Diego Bay from 1854–1855; remained in service until 1891; restored and re-lit by the National Park Service in 1984
18	Gill House		3776 Front St.	7/2/1971	Single-story house designed in 1907 by noted modern architect Irving Gill for Melville and Amy Salz Klauber
19	Fort Rosecrans National Cemetery		Point Loma peninsula	11/6/1970	National military cemetery overlooking the bay and the city; remains of U.S. soldiers killed in the Battle of San Pasqual were moved there in 1882
20	Ballast Point		La Playa Peninsula	11/6/1970	
21	Casa de Lopez		3890 Twiggs, Old Town	11/6/1970	
22	Old La Playa Site		Bayside of Pt. Loma	11/6/1970	
23	Fort Rosecrans Site		Point Loma peninsula	11/6/1970	Fort established in 1852; designated as a monument after World War II
24	Whaley House		2482 San Diego Ave., Old Town	11/6/1970	
25	Serra Palm Site		Taylor St. (Presidio Gardens), Old Town	11/6/1970	
26	Old Spanish Cemetery		San Diego Ave and Arista St., Old Town	11/6/1970	
27	Fort Guijarros		Near base of Ballast Point Peninsula	11/6/1970	Spanish fort built in 1797 on Ballast Point as the first defensive fortifications for San Diego Bay; name means "Fort Cobblestones"; involved in the Battle of San Diego, a naval battle with an American trading vessel
28	Derby Dike Site		Foot of Presidio Hill, Old Town	11/6/1970	
29	Mule Hill Site		Four miles SW of Escondido	11/6/1970	
30	San Diego Barracks Site		Kettner Blvd. "G" and Market Street	11/6/1970	
31	Kate O. Sessions Nursery Site		Pico and Balboa, Pacific Beach	11/6/1970	
32	Derby-Pendleton House		2482 San DiegoAve/4017 Harney, Old Town	11/6/1970	
33	Spanish Landing Site		North Shore of San Diego Bay near old mouth of S.D. River	11/6/1970	
34	Gatewood House		2515 San Diego Ave, Old Town	11/6/1970	
35	Presidio Excavation Site		Presidio Park, Old Town	11/6/1970	Excavation project at the Presidio begun by the San Diego Historical Society in 1965, uncovered chapel foundations, animal bones, sea shells, potsherds and other material
36	Emmet House Site		3919 Twiggs St, Old Town	11/6/1970	
37	Long-Waterman House		2408 1st Ave. 32°43′49″N 117°9′48″W	12/4/1970	Queen Anne style Victorian mansion built in the late 19th century for John Long, president of the Coronado Fruit Package Company; later owned by Robert Whitney Waterman, 17th governor of California
38	Timken House		2508 First Ave	12/4/1970	Queen Anne style Victorian mansion where the art collection in the Timken Museum was originally displayed
39	Quartermass Wilde House		2404 E. Broadway	12/4/1970	Built in 1896, a classic revival style castle containing 8,800 square feet (820 m^{2}). Built in 1896, it is now used as professional offices
40	George W. Marston House		3525 7th Ave. 32°44′29″N 117°9′26″W	12/4/1970	Arts and crafts mansion designed by Irving Gill and completed in 1905; operated as a museum starting in 1987; closed due to lack of funding, February 2009
41	Frederick R. Burnham House		3563 Seventh Ave. 32°44′34″N 117°9′23″W	12/4/1970	American Craftsman style bungalow home built in 1907 for Frederick Russell Burnham; also known as the Burnham-Marston House
42	Casa de Aguirre		2604 San Diego Ave, Old Town	12/4/1970	
43	Gila House Site		3940 Harney St., Old Town	12/4/1970	
44	Franciscan Garden Site		Taylor St. (Presidio Gardens) Old Town	12/4/1970	
45	San Pasqual Grave Site		Trias bet. Hancock and Moore, Old Town	12/4/1970	
46	Cobblestone Jail Site		Haraszthy Jail, Old Town	12/4/1970	
47	Protestant Cemetery Site		Ampudia Street, OldTown	12/4/1970	
48	Hebrew Cemetery Site		Kenyon Street	12/4/1970	
49	Melville-Klauber House		3060 Sixth Ave	January 22, 1971	House designed by Irving Gill and built from 1907–08; its smooth walls and clean openings became trademarks of Gill's later works
50	Arthur Marston House		3575 7th Ave	January 22, 1971	Built in 1907, one of several houses designed by Irving Gill in the 3500 block of 7th Ave.
51	Horton Plaza and Broadway Fountain		Broadway between 3rd and 4th Avenues	March 19, 1971	
52	Britt-Scripps House		406 Maple St.	10/1/1971	Victorian mansion built by E. Britt 1887 and purchased by E.W.Scripps 1897 in the Scripps family for 40 years. Now a private residence.
53	Florence Hotel Tree		Grape between Third and Fourth	12/3/1971	
54	Brooklyn Hotel (Kahles Saddlery) (Horton Grand Hotel)		325 Island Ave	1/7/1972	
55	Jennings House		1018 Rosecrans	1/7/1972	Simple frame house built in 1886
56	Santa Fe Depot		1050 Kettner St. 32°43′1″N 117°10′7″W	2/4/1972	Train station built in 1915 by the Atchison, Topeka and Santa Fe Railway to accommodate visitors to the Panama–California Exposition; still an active depot for Amtrak, San Diego Trolley, and San Diego buses
57	H.E. Watts House		1767 Second Ave.	5/4/1972	
58	Livingston House Site			March 3, 1972	
59	Litgow-Hackett Torrey Pine		1534 First Ave	March 3, 1972	
60	Ford Building		Balboa Park, Palisades Area; 32°43′34″N 117°9′13″W	4/7/1972	Streamline Moderne structure in Balboa Park designed by Walter Dorwin Teague and sponsored by Ford Motor Company for the California Pacific International Exposition in 1935; stylized after a V8 engine; now home to the San Diego Air & Space Museum
61	Horton's Addition Block 252		Bounded by First Ave., Grape, Front and Fir Streets	5/10/1972	
62	Lee House No. 2		3353 Albatross St.	5/10/1972	
63	Lee House No. 4		3367 Albatross St.	5/10/1972	
64	Teats House No. 2		3415 Albatross	5/10/1972	
65	Teats House No. 3		3407 Albatross St.	5/10/1972	
66	Backesto Building		614 Fifth Ave.	6/2/1972	Built in 1873, it was at the heart of New Town's business district; grocery and general merchandise store in the 1870s and 1880s; later San Diego Hardware
67	Hubbell Building		813 Fifth Ave.	6/2/1972	
68	Marston Building		809 Fifth Ave.	6/2/1972	
69	McGurck Block		611 Fifth Ave.	6/2/1972	Italianate Revival commercial building in Gaslamp Quarter was site of the Ferris and Ferris Drug Store from 1903–1984; upper floors were as a hotel; now houses Z Gallerie
70	I.O.O.F. Building		526 Market St. 32°42′42″N 117°9′31″W	6/2/1972	Commercial building in the Gaslamp Quarter built in 1882
71	Keating Building		432 "F" St.	6/2/1972	Romanesque style commercial structure in Gaslamp Quarter built in 1890; early tenants included the San Diego Savings Bank, the public library and the Humane Society
72	Nesmith–Greely Building		825–831 Fifth Ave	6/2/1972	
73	Louis Bank of Commerce		835-345 Fifth Ave	6/2/1972	
74	Yuma Building		631–633 Fifth Ave	6/2/1972	Structure in Gaslamp Quarter built in 1886 with ornate facade
75	Johnson-Taylor Adobe of Rancho de los Peñasquitos		Rancho Peñasquitos	8/4/1972	
76	Spreckels Theatre		123 W. Broadway; 32°42′55″N 117°9′45″W	8/4/1972	Theater designed by Harrison Albright for John D. Spreckels; touted as "the first modern commercial playhouse west of the Mississippi" at opening in 1912
77	Balboa Theatre		868 4th Ave. 32°42′50″N 117°9′38″W	8/4/1972	Built in 1924 as a grand movie palace; converted to housing for the U.S. Navy during World War II; re-opened in 2005 as a live theater and concert venue
78	Weldon Glasson House (Chateau de Toman)		3139 Franklin Ave	11/3/1972	Built in 1880, the oldest house in the Logan Heights area
79	La Jolla Women's Club		715 Silverado St	3/2/1973	Clubhouse building designed by Irving Gill and built in 1914
80	Adobe Falls		Portion Lot 67 Part. Map of Ranch Mission	4/6/1973	Adobe Falls is a multi-level waterfall on the San Diego River, north of Interstate 8 and San Diego State University. The rocks have been covered with graffiti.
81	Piedras Pintados		Northwest corner Rancho Bernardo	4/6/1973	
82	Temple Beth Israel		Heritage Park, Old Town	6/1/1973	Temple Beth Israel is San Diego's first synagogue. It is located in Heritage Park in San Diego's Old Town area. The first services held here were on September 25, 1889.
83	San Diego Steam Laundry		1157 Columbia	6/1/1973	
84	Green Dragon Colony Site		1258–1274 Prospect St, La Jolla	7/6/1973	Group of 12 coastal cottages built by German immigrant Anna Held Heinrich; became an artists colony
85	Hayward-Patterson House		2148 Broadway	9/7/1973	
86	La Jolla Recreational Center		615 Prospect Street, La Jolla	9/7/1973	Built in 1915 by Ellen Browning-Scripps and dedicated that same year to the City of San Diego for the children of La Jolla
87	El Cuervo Adobe		West end of Rancho de los Penasquitos	10/5/1973	
88	First National Bank		Fifth Ave & E Street	10/5/1973	
89	Plunge		Belmont Park, Mission Beach	12/7/1973	
90	Mission Beach Roller Coaster		3000 Mission Blvd. 32°46′18″N 117°15′0″W	12/7/1973	Wooden roller coaster built in 1925 in Belmont Park on Mission Beach; also known as the Giant Dipper
91	Merry-go-round		Belmont Park, Mission Beach	12/7/1973	
92	Spencer Ogden Building		750 Fifth Ave	3/1/1974	
93	Llewelyn Building		722–728 Fifth Ave	4/5/1974	
94	Judge Torrance House		136 Juniper Street	4/5/1974	
95	Grand-Horton Hotel		325 Island Ave	4/5/1974	
96	Golden West Hotel		720 Fourth Ave	9/6/1974	
97	Mary Cassitt House (No. 4)		3526 Seventh Ave	10/4/1974	
98	Teats House (No. 1)		3560 Seventh Ave	10/4/1974	
99	Alice Lee Residence		3578 Seventh Ave	10/4/1974	
100	House Lot D, Block 234 Horton Addition		1929 Front Street	11/1/1974	
101	Red Roost and Red Rest		1187 and 1179 Coast Blvd., La Jolla; 32°50′59″N 117°16′18″W	1/3/1975	Built in 1894, oldest surviving examples of late-Victorian beach cottage architecture; vacant since 1917 and subject of controversy over "demolition by neglect"
102	Tyrolean Terrace Colony		1290–1298 Prospect St, La Jolla	2/7/1975	Demolished for Coast Walk Shopping Center
103	Cole Block		660 Fifth Ave.	5/2/1975	Commercial block in Gaslamp Quarter built in 1892 by Albert Cole; early tenants included Theopile Verlaque, who ran a liquor store at the corner and developed San Diego's wine-making industry
104	Sherman-Doig House		136 W Fir Street	7/11/1975	
105	San Diego Rowing Club		525 E Harbor Drive	7/11/1975	
106	Waldo Waterman Monument		Corner of Maple & Albatross Streets (northerly terminus)	8/1/1975	
107	Cliff Mansion		1203 Sunset Cliffs Blvd	12/5/1975	Mediterranean style house built from 1926–1928 by John Mills
108	Pottery Canyon Park		2725 Torrey Pines Rd, La Jolla	2/6/1976	
109	Buckner Hotel		765 10th Avenue	4/2/1976	
110	Kiessig Corner		1401–1419 2nd, 222 Ash	7/9/1976	
111	U.S. Custom and Court House		325 West F Street	7/9/1976	
112	Theosophical Institute		3900 Lomaland Drive	8/6/1976	Commune based on theosophy founded at Point Loma in 1897 by Katherine Tingley; became known as Lomaland, a regional center for the arts; now the site of Point Loma Nazarene University; buildings include Spaulding Home, Greek Theatre, Beaver Home, Lotus Home, and Madam Tingley Home
113	Mission San Diego de Alcalá		5 mi (8.0 km). E of Old Town San Diego on Friars Rd. 32°47′4″N 117°6′23″W	8/6/1976	Site of the first Christian burial in Alta California; Father Luís Jayme, "California's First Christian Martyr", lies entombed beneath the chancel floor; the current church is the fourth to stand on this location
114	McConaughy House		Heritage Park, Old Town	11/5/1976	
115	Hearne Surgical Hospital (Ashforth Building)		420 Ash Street	12/3/1976	
116	Spruce Street Suspension Bridge		Spruce Street between Front & Brant Streets	1/7/1977	
117	El Pueblo Ribera		230–248 Gravilla St.	2/4/1977	
118	Charles A. Martin House		3147 Front Street	3/4/1977	
119	George H. Scripps Memorial Marine Biological Laboratory		8602 La Jolla Shores Dr. 32°51′54″N 117°15′12″W	5/6/1977	Oldest oceanographic research building in continuous use in the United States built in 1909, as part of the Scripps Institution of Oceanography, the nation's first oceanographic institute founded in 1903
120	Tucker House		2470 Union Street	7/8/1977	
121	Rynearson House/Mansion		2441-43 E Street	8/5/1977	
122	Faulk-Klauber House		3000 E Street	1/6/1978	
123	Residence at 1632 Union Street		1632 Union Street	2/3/1978	
124	Fulford Bungalow No.14		2516 San Marcos Ave.	6/2/1978	
125	Fulford Bungalow No. 24		2518 San Marcos Ave. 32°43′58″N 117°7′43″W	6/2/1978	
126	Fulford Bungalow No. 34		2520 San Marcos Ave. 32°43′58″N 117°7′42″W	6/2/1978	
127	Gaslamp Quarter Historic District		4th & 6th Avenues, Broadway and the Santa Fe R.R. Tracks; 32°42′42″N 117°9′33″W	6/2/1978	Historical neighborhood in Downtown San Diego; development began in 1867, when Alonzo Horton bought the land in hopes of creating a new city center closer to the bay; underwent urban renewal in the 1980s and 1990s
128	Heritage Place La Jolla		7210 La Jolla Blvd, La Jolla	July 7, 1978	
129	Sherman Judson House		1930 First Avenue	9/1/1978	
130	Greater Golden Hill Historic District		Russ Blvd on North, Hwy 94 on South, 25th St on East, and 24th on West	10/6/1978	
131	Western Metal Building		215 Seventh Ave	11/3/1978	This building was rehabilitated and incorporated into Petco Park, including the brick facades, wood windows, vault and heavy timber frame.
132	Watts Building		520 E St. 32°42′53″N 117°9′32″W	12/1/1978	
133	Galusha B. Grow Cottage		7210 La Jolla Blvd, La Jolla	February 16, 1979	
134	Chaplain's Residence		836 Washington St. 32°45′2″N 117°9′20″W	February 2, 1979	
135	Medico-Dental Building		233 A St. 32°43′6″N 117°9′41″W	3/2/1979	
136	Broderick-Kenny House		2133 Second Ave	5/4/1979	
137	Royal Pie Bakery		560 Fourth Avenue	6/1/1979	
138	Gorham House		2040–2042 Kearney Ave. 32°42′02″N 117°8′27″W	8/3/1979	
139	Elk's Hall		350 Cedar St. 32°43′19″N 117°9′41″W	11/2/1979	
140	Robert E. Lee Hotel, Lyceum Theater, Commodore Hotel		815 3rd Ave. (Hotel); 314 F St. (Theater); 32°42′50″N 117°9′39″W	1/11/1980	Demolished during construction of Westfield Horton Plaza—portions reproduced
141	Hotel Knickerbocker		315 E Street	1/11/1980	
142	Neresheimer-Tingley House		430 Silvergate Ave. 32°42′44″N 117°14′43″W	3/7/1980	Victorian home built for Katherine Tingley, head of the Theosophical Institute
143	Chicano Park		From Crosby to Dewey to Evans St. between Logan, National, and Newton. 32°42′01″N 117°8′34″W	3/7/1980	Park located beneath the Coronado Bridge in Logan Heights; contains 67 outdoor murals and other works
144	Pythian Building		211 E St. and 870 3rd Ave. 32°42′52″N 117°9′41″W	4/8/1980	Demolished during construction of Westfield Horton Plaza
145	McClintock Storage Warehouse		1202 Kettner Blvd. 32°43′5″N 117°10′7″W	7/1/1980	Stucco and concrete storage warehouse built in 1925 in the Mission Spanish Revival style; later known as the Bekings Building
146	Stough-Beckett Cottage		2203 Denver St. 32°47′04″N 117°12′13″W	8/5/1980	
147	Marin Hotel		552 Fifth Ave. 32°42′39″N 117°9′36″W	11/4/1980	
148	Hawthorne Inn		2121 1st Ave. 32°43′38″N 117°9′46″W	11/4/1980	
149	Garrettson House		2366 Front St. 32°43′48″N 117°9′53″W	4/7/1981	
150	Chinese Benevolent Society Building		426 3rd Ave. 32°42′35″N 117°9′44″W	6/2/1981	

== See also ==
- National Register of Historic Places listings in San Diego County
- List of San Diego Historical Landmarks in La Jolla, California
- List of San Diego Historic Landmarks in the Point Loma and Ocean Beach areas
