= Exchange Club (San Diego) =

Historic building in San Diego, California, U.S.

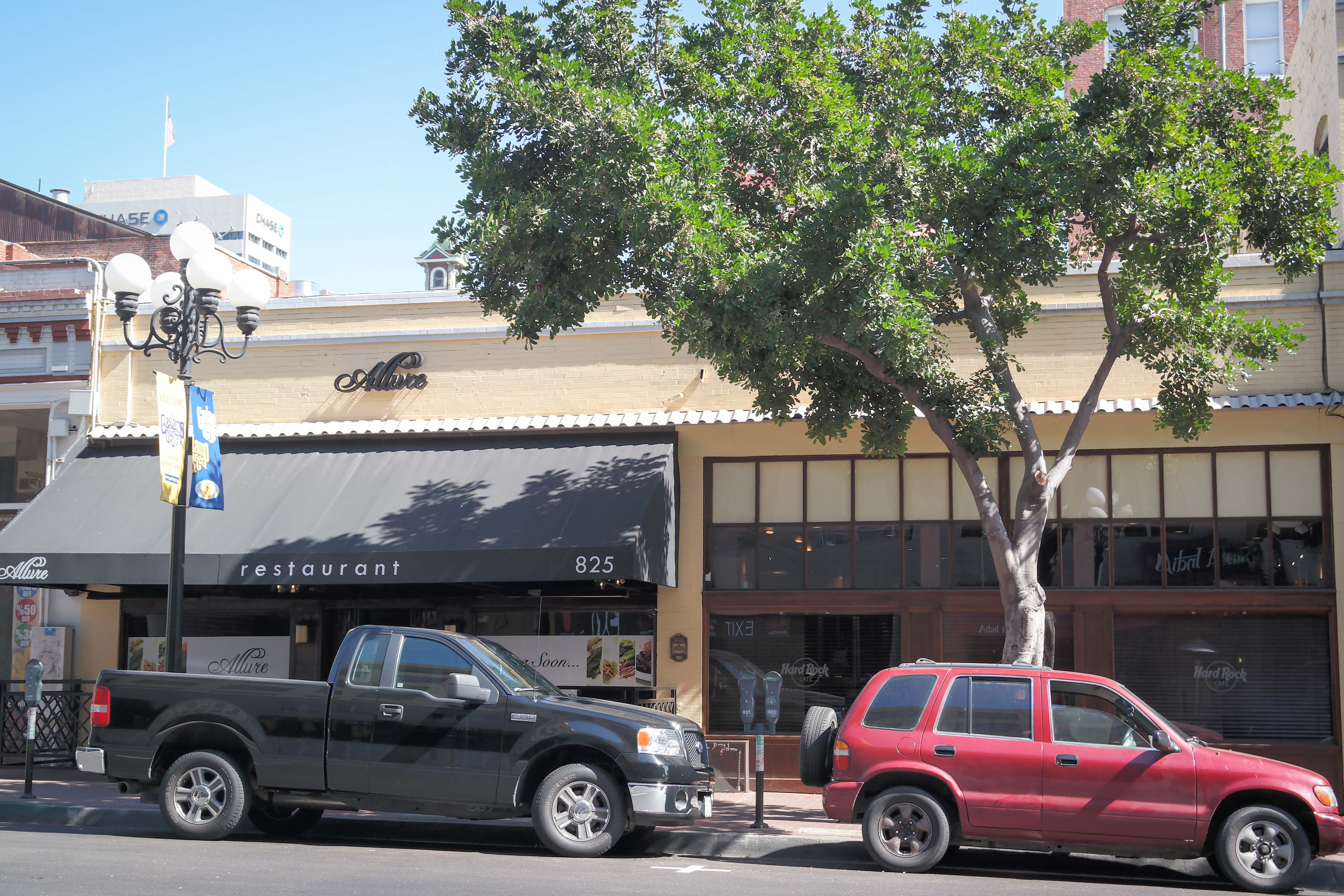
- The building's exterior in 2014
- Interactive map of the Exchange Club area

General information
- Location: 815 4th Avenue, San Diego, California, United States
- Coordinates: 32.713949°N 117.160924°W

The Exchange Club is an historic structure located at 815 4th Avenue in the Gaslamp Quarter, San Diego, in the U.S. state of California. It was built in 1905.

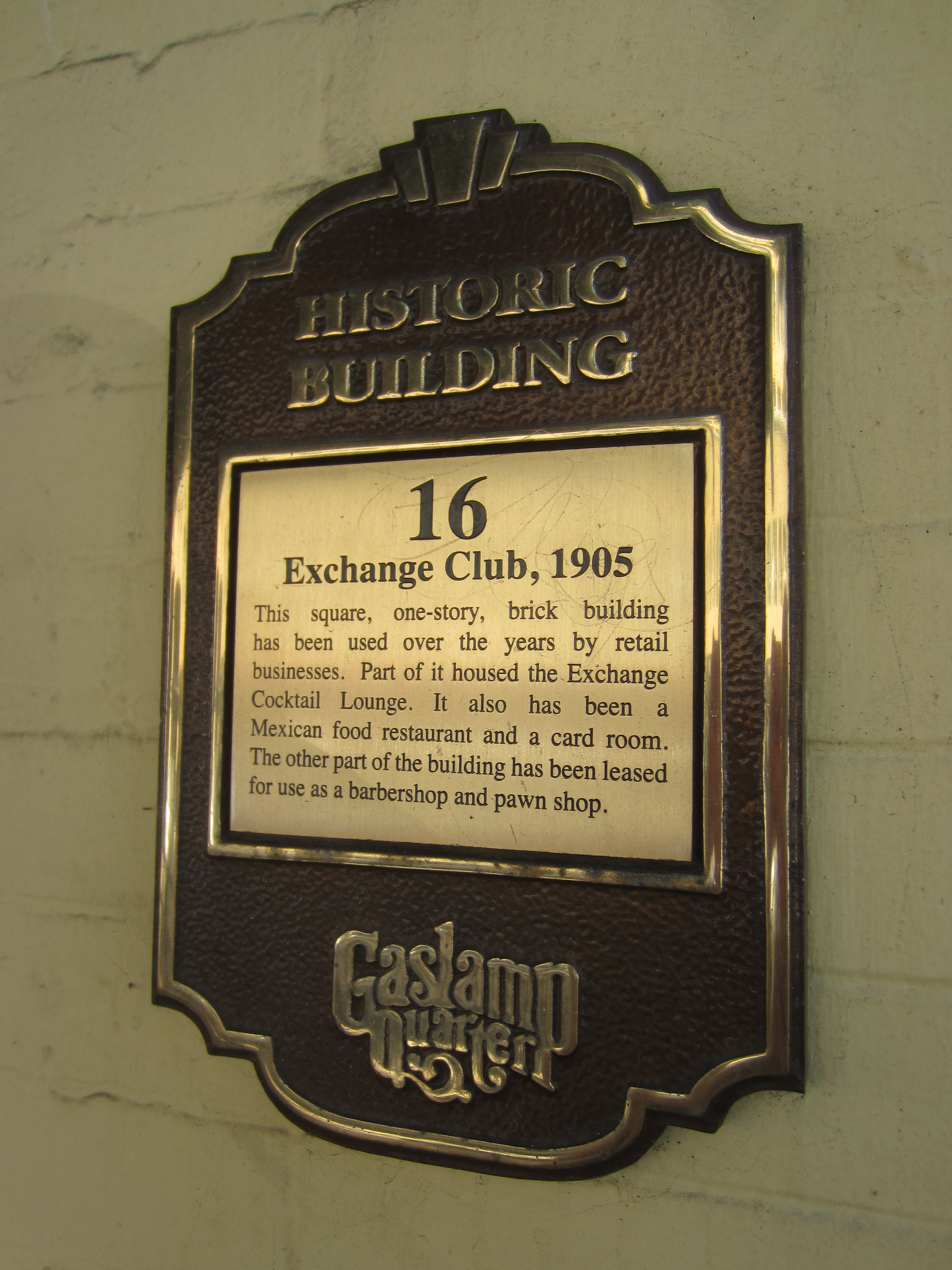
Plaque for the building, 2016

== See also ==
- List of Gaslamp Quarter historic buildings
