= Panama Cafe =

Historic building in San Diego, California, U.S.

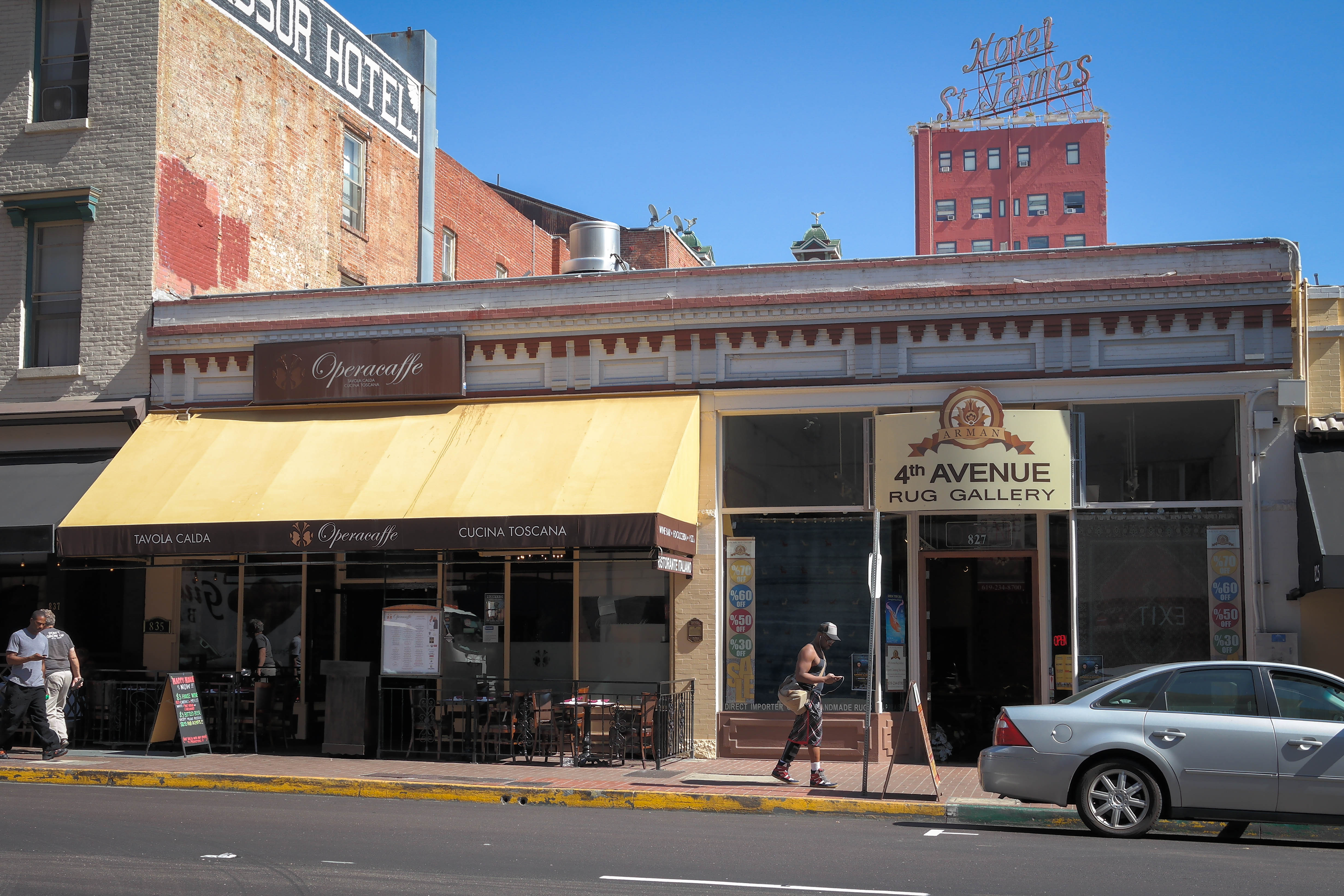
- The building's exterior in 2014
- Interactive map of the Panama Cafe area

General information
- Location: San Diego, California, U.S.
- Coordinates: 32°42′50.6″N 117°9′39.2″W

The Panama Cafe is an historic structure located at 827 4th Avenue in the Gaslamp Quarter, San Diego, in the U.S. state of California. It was built in 1907.

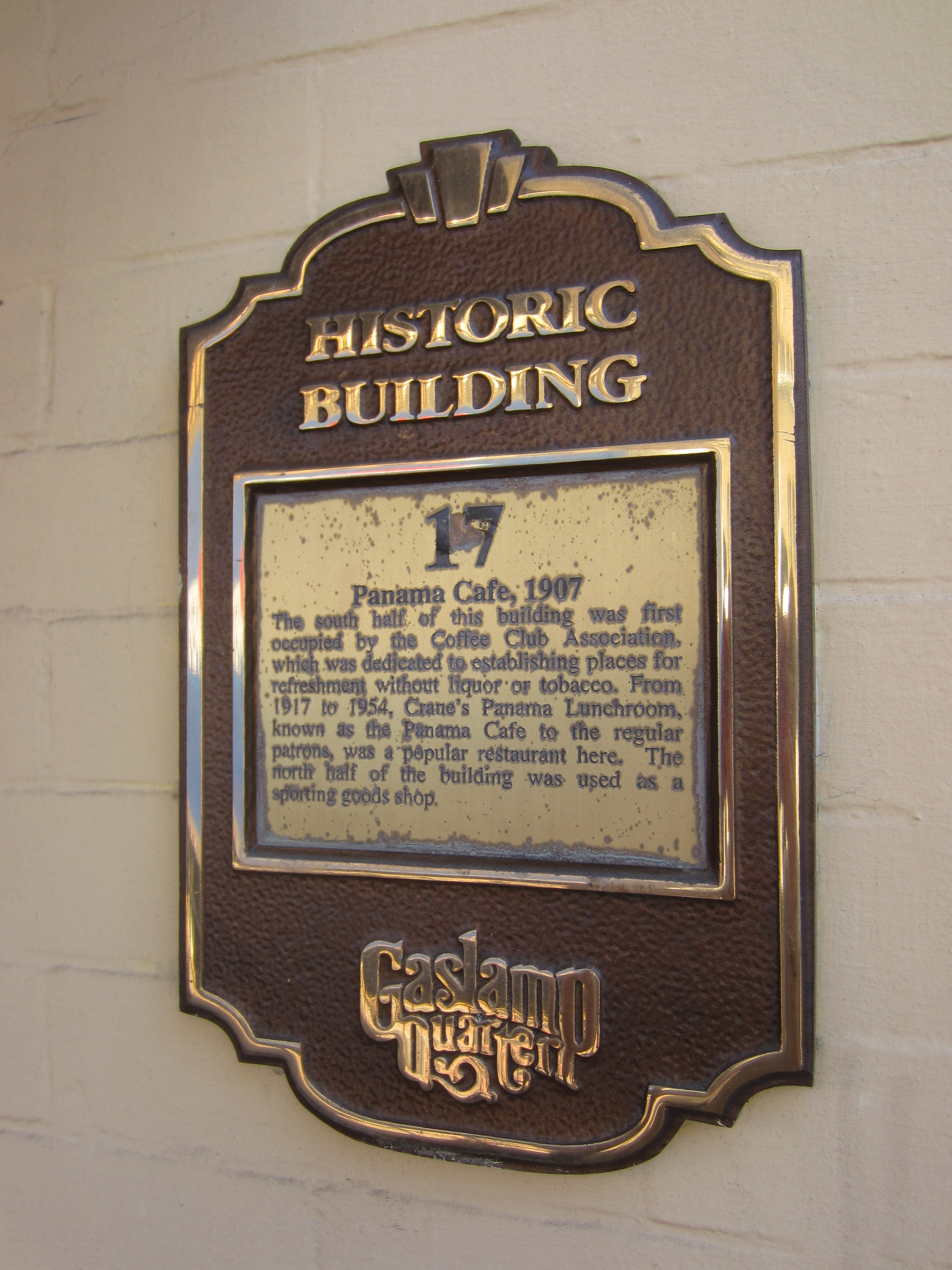
Plaque for the building, 2016

== See also ==
- List of Gaslamp Quarter historic buildings
