= Lewis Brick Block =

Historic building in San Diego, California, U.S.

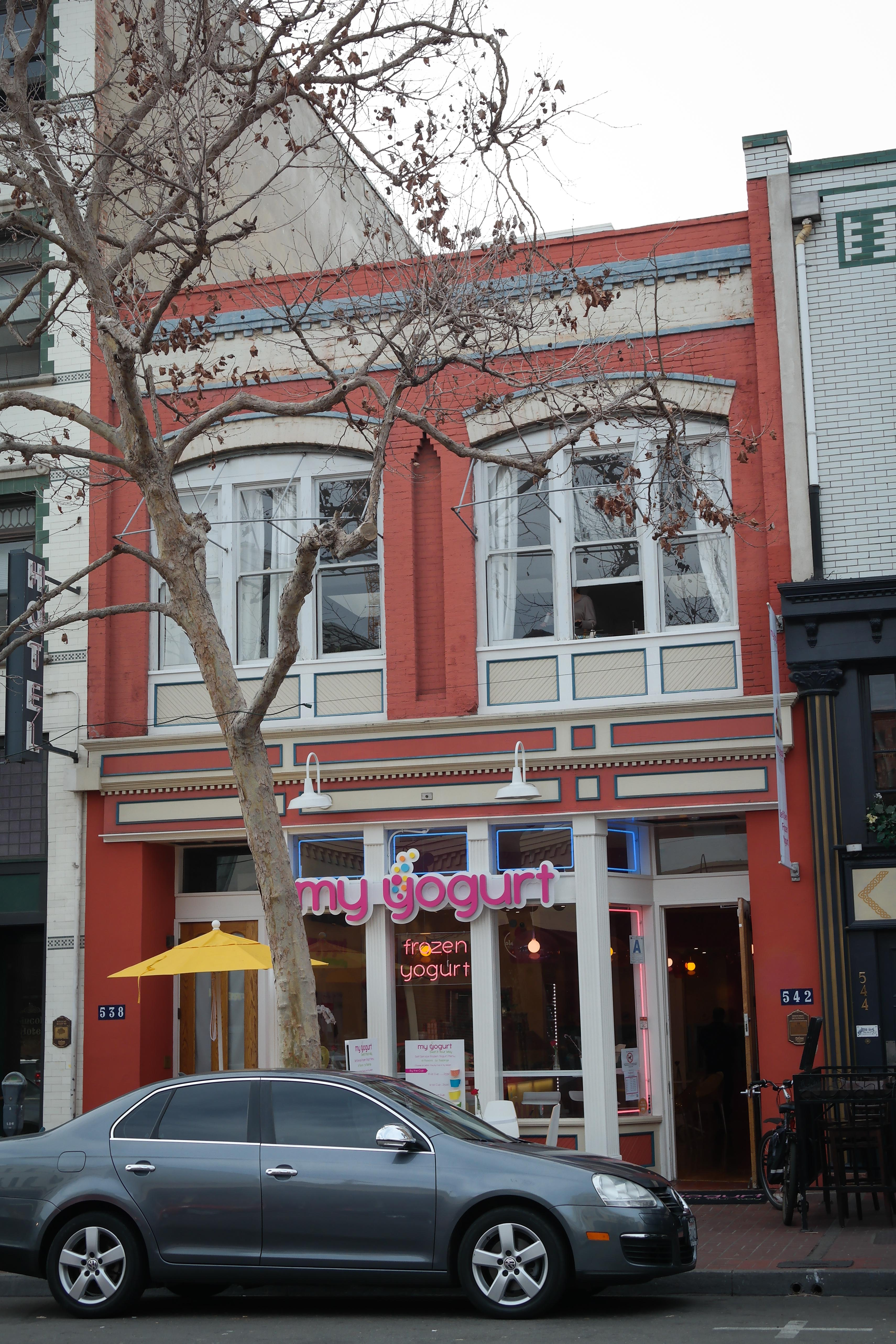
- The building's exterior in 2014
- Interactive map of the Lewis Brick Block area

General information
- Location: 538 5th Avenue, San Diego, United States
- Coordinates: 32.711°N 117.1603°W
- Opened: 1887

The Lewis Brick Block, also known as the Stingaree Hotel, is an historic structure located at 538 5th Avenue in the Gaslamp Quarter, San Diego, in the U.S. state of California. It was built in 1885. The Victorian Commercial two-story rectangular building is constructed of brick with a flat roof. Ground floor commercial operations have included Joseph Hensley's cigar and tobacco shop from 1887 to 1888, billiard halls, the San Diego Lighthouse Revival Center, My Yogurt (a frozen yogurt shop), and Ike's Place (a sandwich shop).

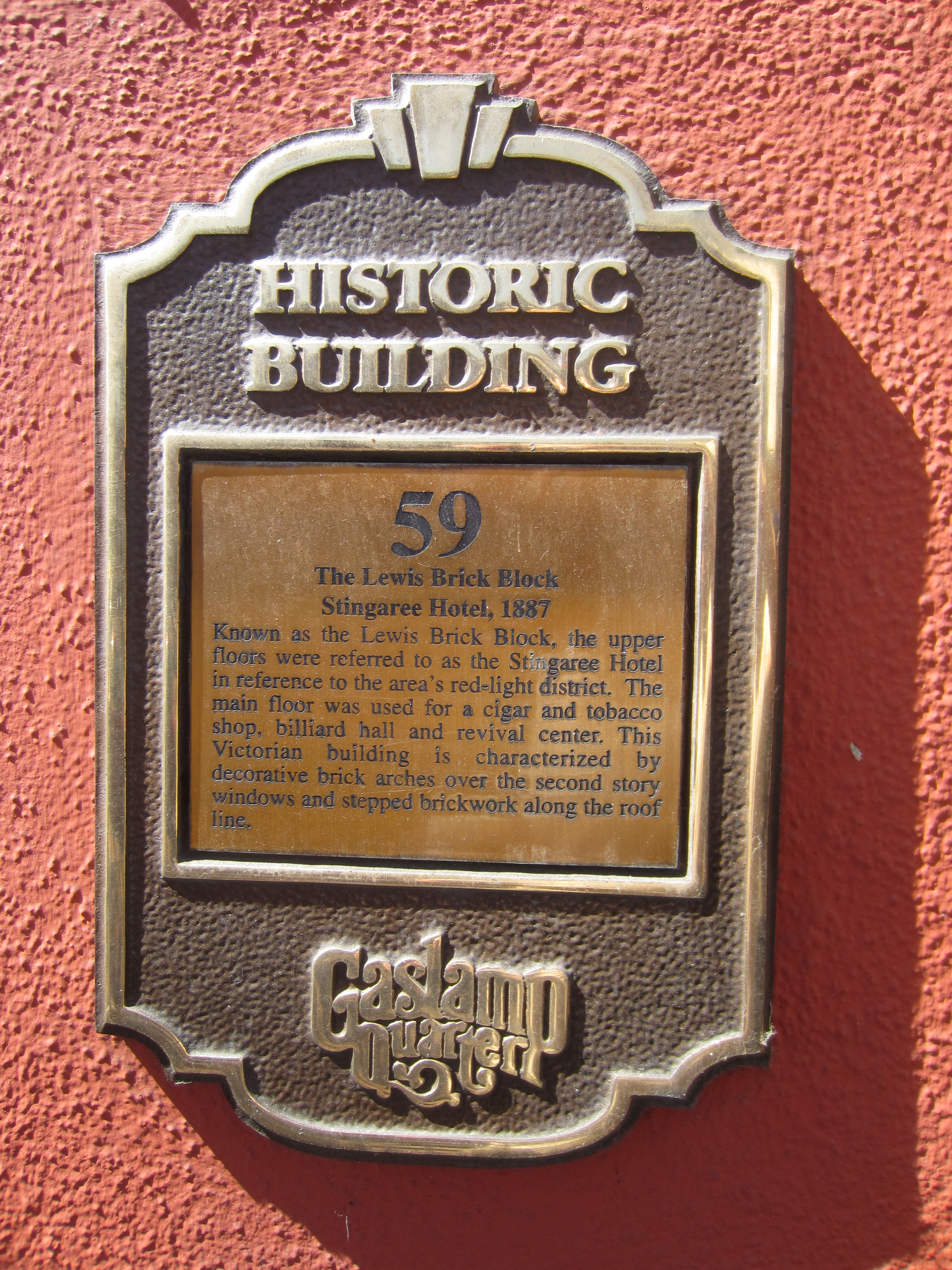
Plaque for the building, 2016

== See also ==
- List of Gaslamp Quarter historic buildings
