= Samuel I. Fox Building =

Historic building in San Diego, California, U.S.

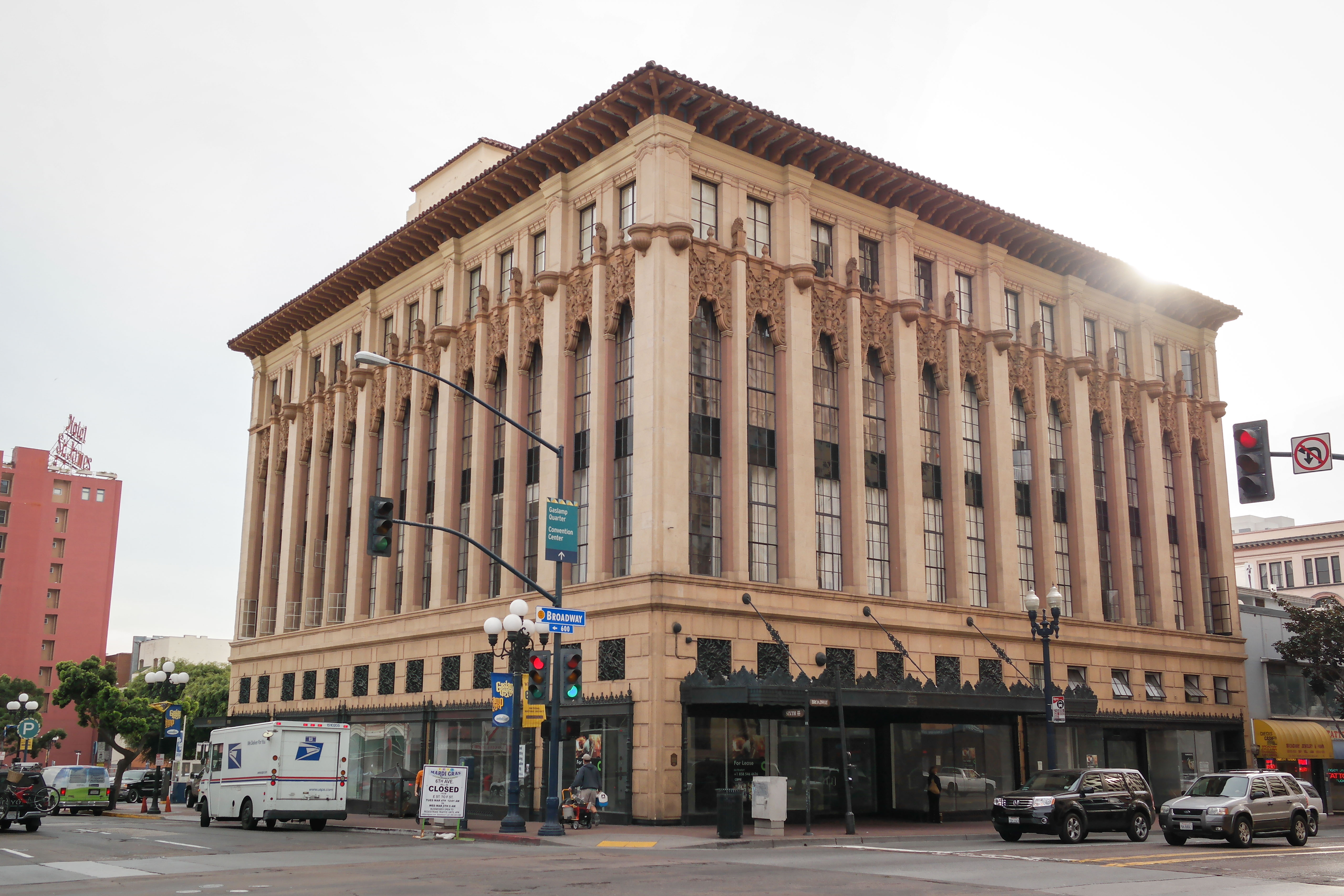
- The building's exterior in 2014
- Interactive map of the Samuel I. Fox Building area

General information
- Architectural style: Art Deco
- Location: 531 Broadway, San Diego, United States
- Coordinates: 32°42′56″N 117°09′34″W
- Opened: 1929

Design and construction
- Architect: William Templeton Johnson

The Samuel I. Fox Building is an historic building located at 531 Broadway in San Diego's Gaslamp Quarter, in the U.S. state of California. The Art Deco building was designed by William Templeton Johnson, and completed in 1929.

== See also ==
- List of Gaslamp Quarter historic buildings
