= Cole Block Building =

Historic building in San Diego, California, U.S.

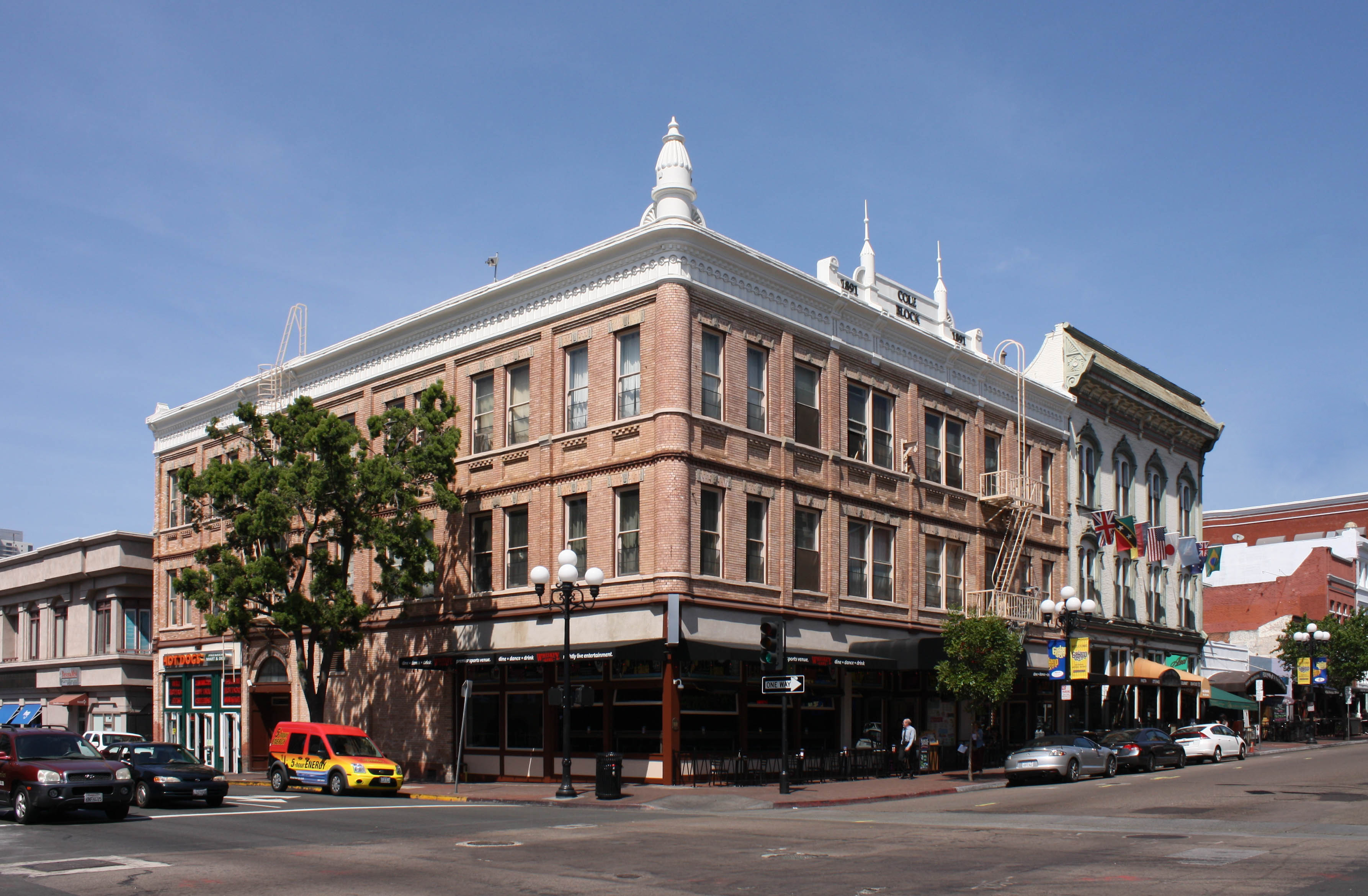
- The building's exterior in 2014
- Interactive map of the Cole Block Building area

General information
- Location: 702 5th Avenue, San Diego, California, United States
- Coordinates: 32.7128°N 117.1605°W

The Cole Block Building is an historic structure located at 702 5th Avenue in the Gaslamp Quarter of San Diego, California. It was built in 1892, and housed the restaurant La Strada, as of 2011.

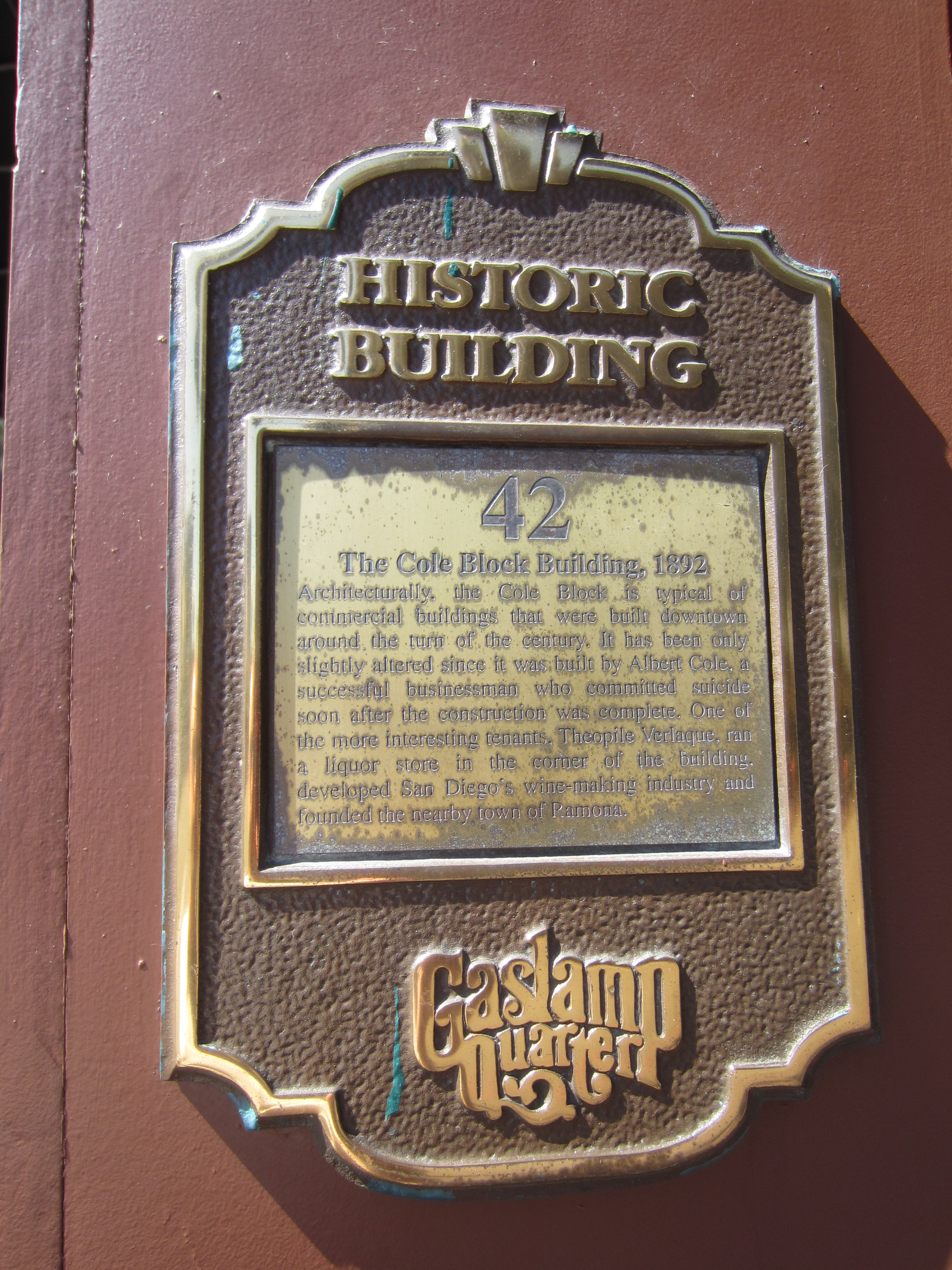
Plaque for the building, 2016

== See also ==
- List of Gaslamp Quarter historic buildings
- List of San Diego Historic Landmarks
