= Montijo Building =

Historic building in San Diego, California, U.S.

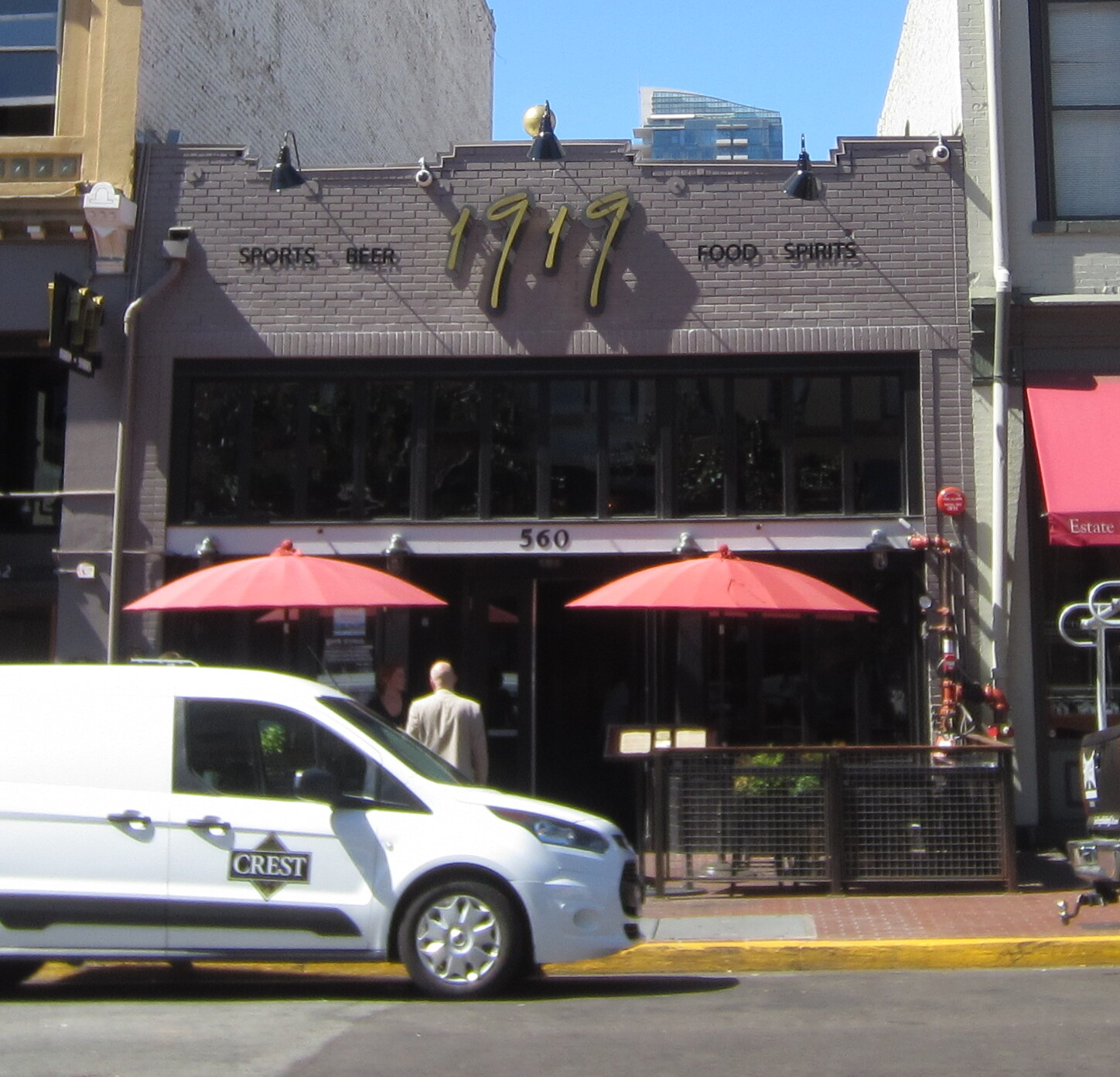
- The building's exterior in 2016
- Interactive map of the Montijo Building area

General information
- Location: 554 5th Avenue, San Diego, United States
- Coordinates: 32.71112°N 117.1603°W
- Opened: 1895

The Montijo Building is an historic structure located at 554 5th Avenue in San Diego's Gaslamp Quarter, in the U.S. state of California. It was built in 1895.

== See also ==
- List of Gaslamp Quarter historic buildings
