= Hubbell Building =

Hubbell Building may refer to:

- Hubbell Building (San Diego), California, a San Diego Historic Landmark
- Hubbell Building (Des Moines, Iowa), listed on the National Register of Historic Places
