= William Penn Hotel (San Diego) =

Historic building in San Diego, California, U.S.

Coordinates: 32.71344°N 117.15987°W

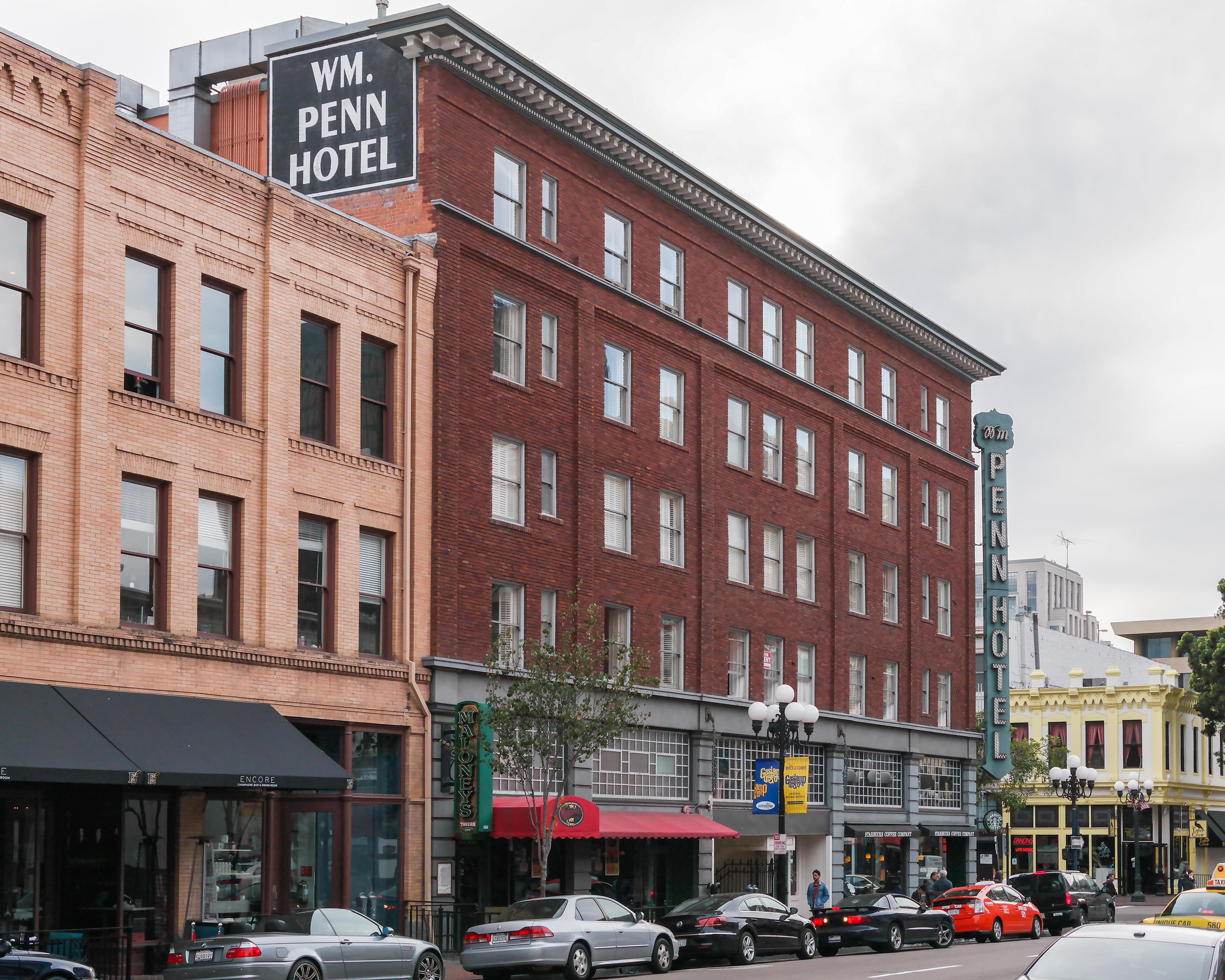
- The building's exterior in 2014
- Interactive map of the William Penn Hotel area

General information
- Location: San Diego, United States

The William Penn Hotel is an historic structure located at 511 F Street in San Diego's Gaslamp Quarter, in the U.S. state of California. It was built in 1920.

== See also ==
- List of Gaslamp Quarter historic buildings
