= McGurck Block =

Historic building in San Diego, California, U.S.

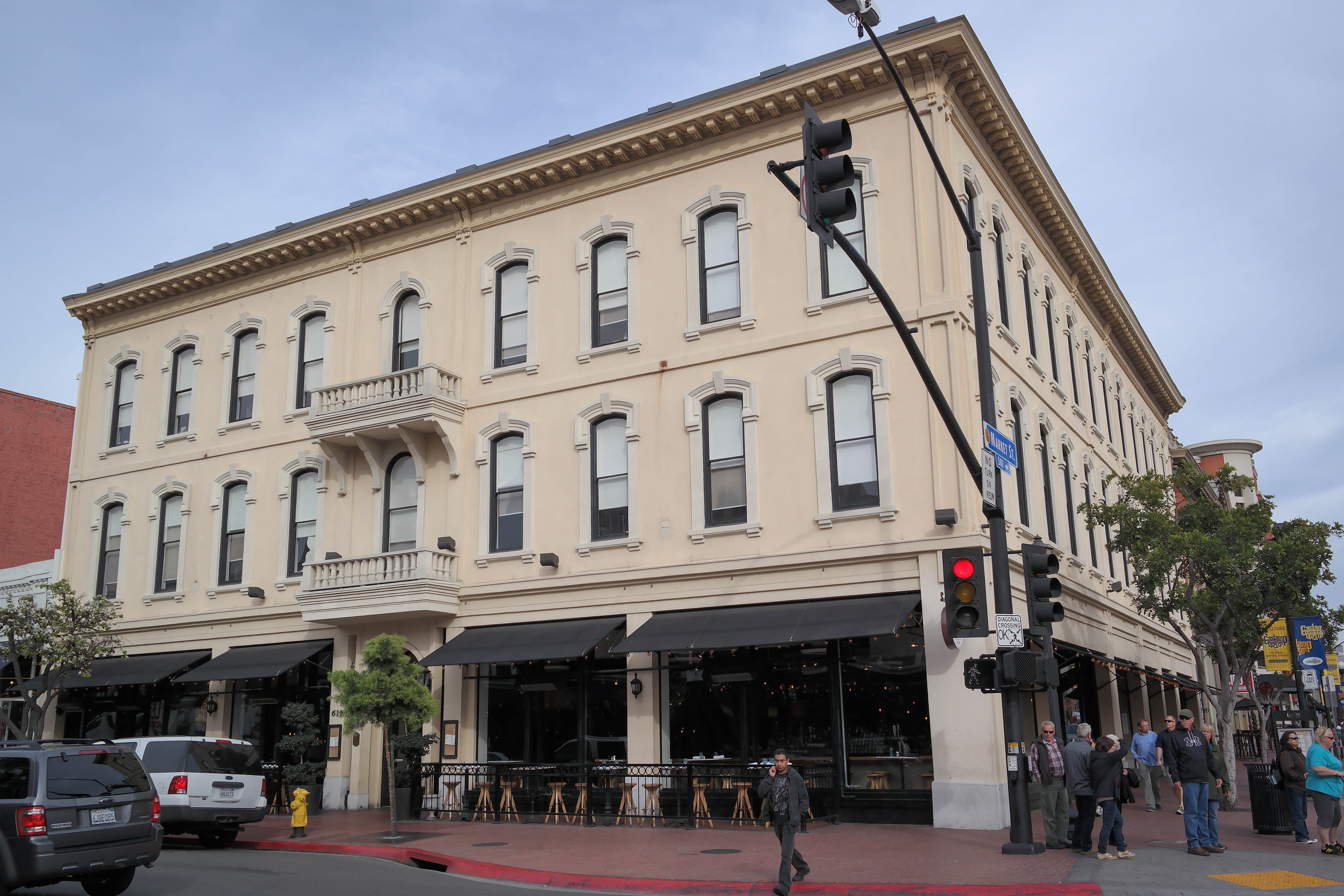
- The building's exterior in 2014
- Interactive map of the McGurck Block area

General information
- Location: 611 5th Avenue, San Diego, California
- Coordinates: 32°42′42″N 117°9′35.5″W
- Completed: 1887

The McGurck Block is a historic structure located at 611 5th Avenue in San Diego's Gaslamp Quarter, in the U.S. state of California. It was built in 1887.

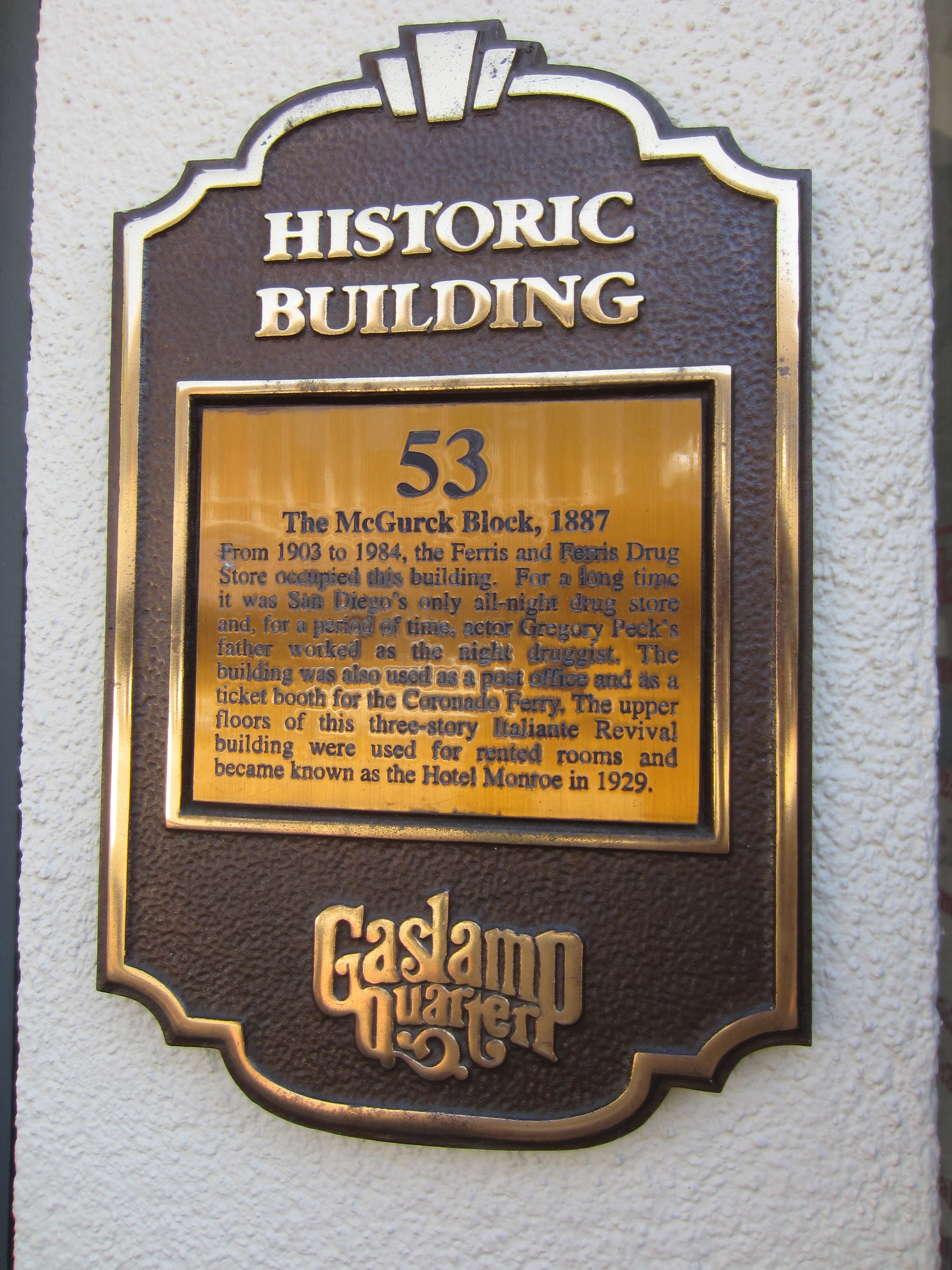
Plaque for the building, 2016

== See also ==
- List of Gaslamp Quarter historic buildings
- List of San Diego Historic Landmarks
