= Maryland Hotel (San Diego) =

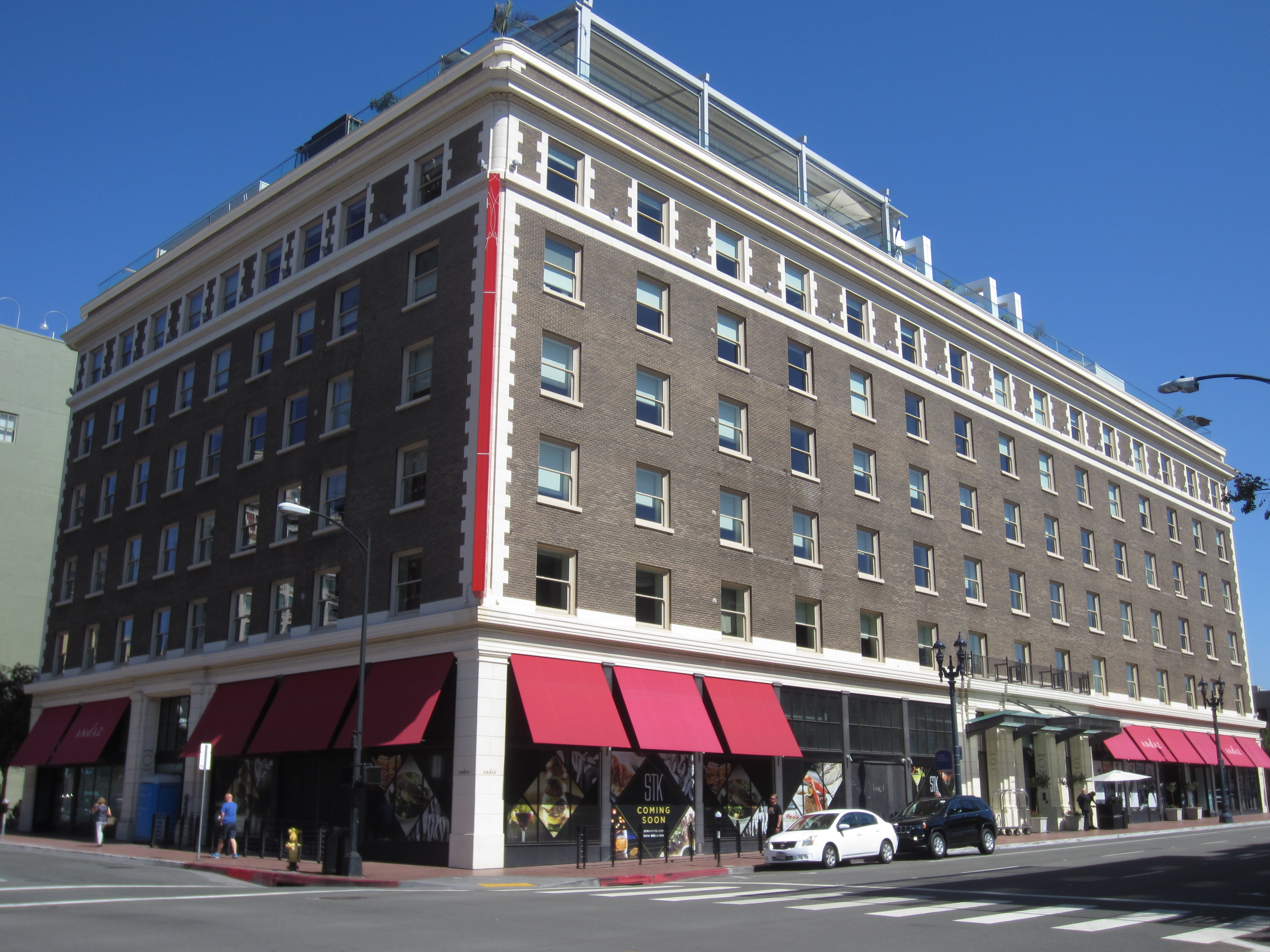
- The building's exterior in 2016
- Interactive map of the Maryland Hotel area

General information
- Location: San Diego, California, United States
- Coordinates: 32.7138°N 117.15881°W

The Maryland Hotel is an historic building near San Diego's Gaslamp Quarter, in the U.S. state of California.
