= Yuma Building =

Historic building in San Diego, California, U.S.

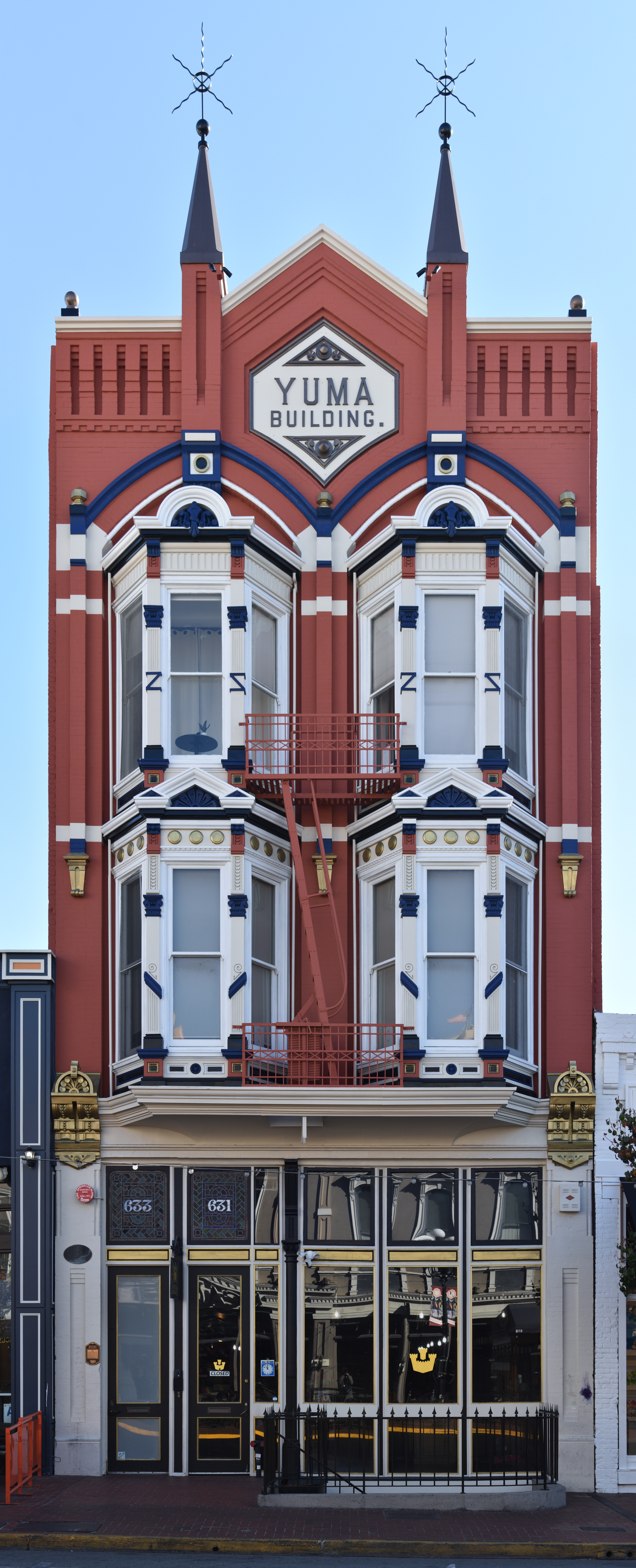
- The building's exterior in 2024

General information
- Location: San Diego, United States
- Coordinates: 32.71202°N 117.15992°W

The Yuma Building is a historic structure located at 631 5th Avenue in San Diego's Gaslamp Quarter, in the U.S. state of California. It was built in 1882 by Captain Alfred Henry Wilcox, a significant figure in San Diego's early development. The building reflects his extensive involvement in maritime activities along the Colorado River, particularly around Yuma, Arizona, which inspired its name.

Beyond his maritime pursuits, Captain Wilcox engaged in various commercial ventures, including water supply contracts for the city, involvement with the San Diego Daily Bulletin, and serving as president of the Commercial Bank of San Diego.

The original structure of the Yuma Building was a single-story brick edifice, among the first in San Diego to be built entirely of bricks. Following Wilcox's death in 1883, his widow, Maria Antonia Arguello, oversaw the expansion of the building into its current three-story form.

Throughout its history, the Yuma Building has housed various businesses, including a Japanese bazaar, medical offices, and dry goods stores. In 1912, it was one of the first establishments to be targeted and closed during the infamous Stingaree District raids aimed at curbing brothels and illicit activities in the area.

As of November 2024, the Yuma Building was acquired by Ruth-Ann Thorn, a member of the Rincon Band of Luiseño Indians, marking her as the first Native American to own property in the Gaslamp Quarter.

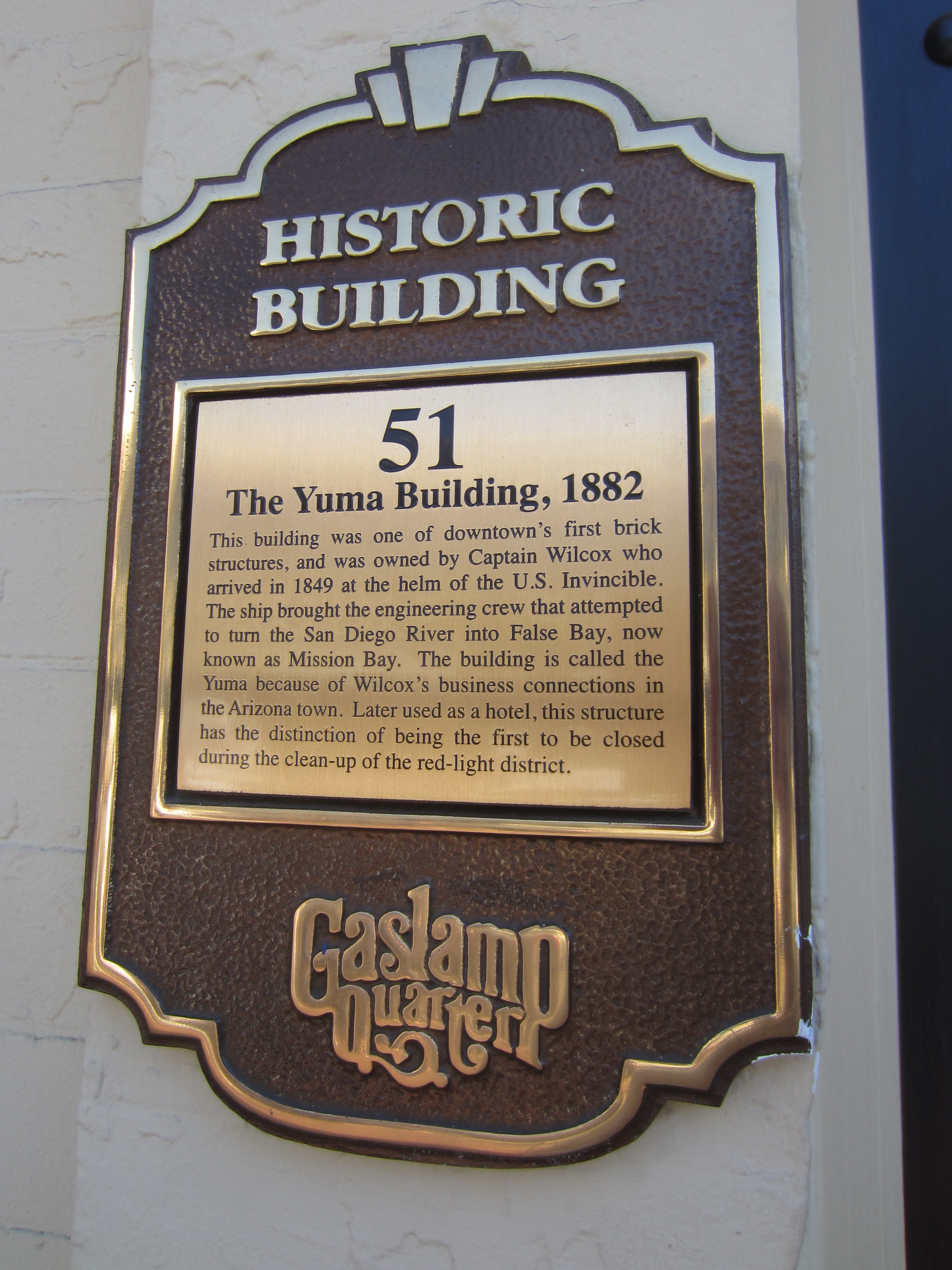
Plaque, 2016

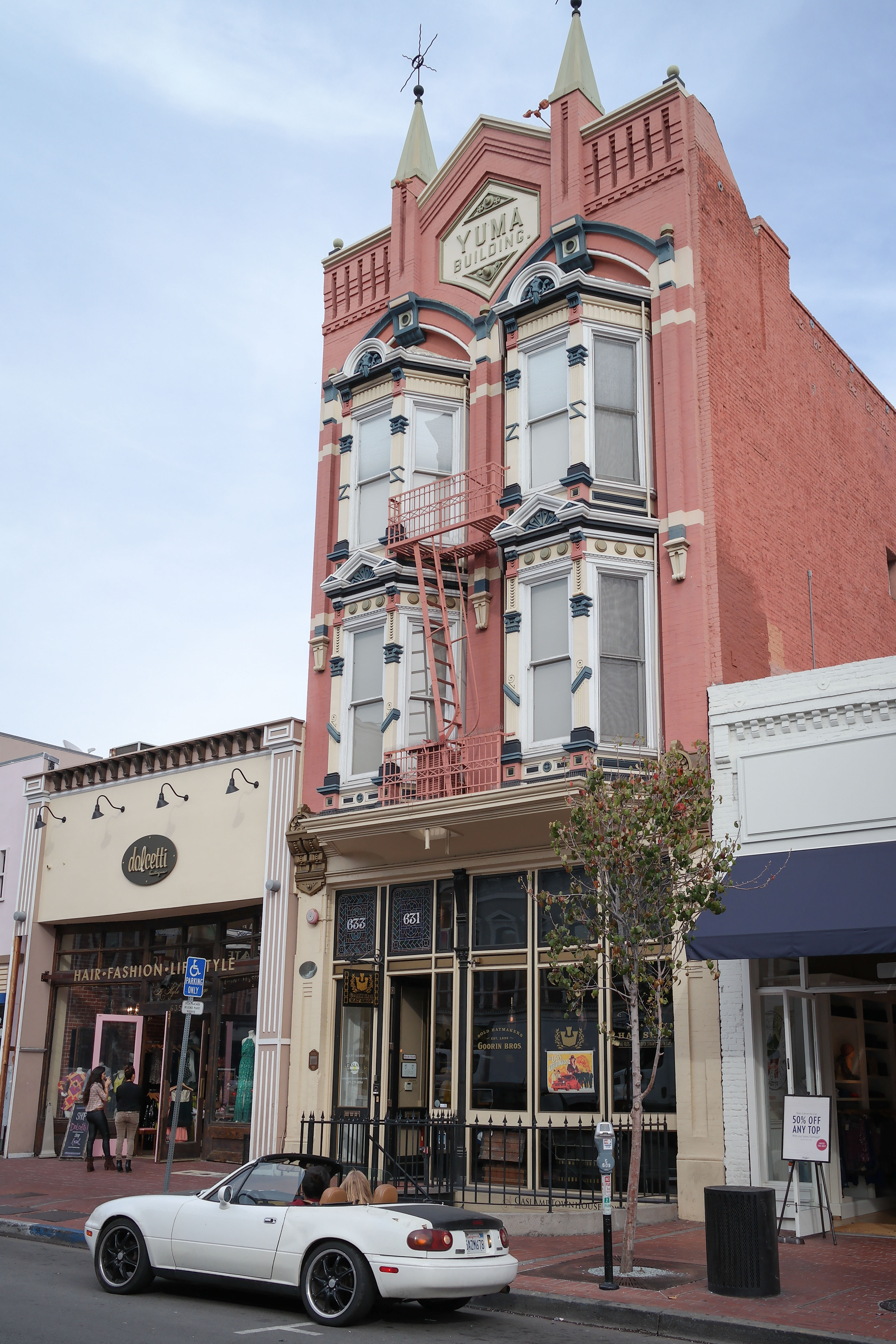
The building's exterior in 2014

== See also ==
- List of Gaslamp Quarter historic buildings
- List of San Diego Historic Landmarks
