= Llewelyn Building =

Historic building in San Diego, California, U.S.

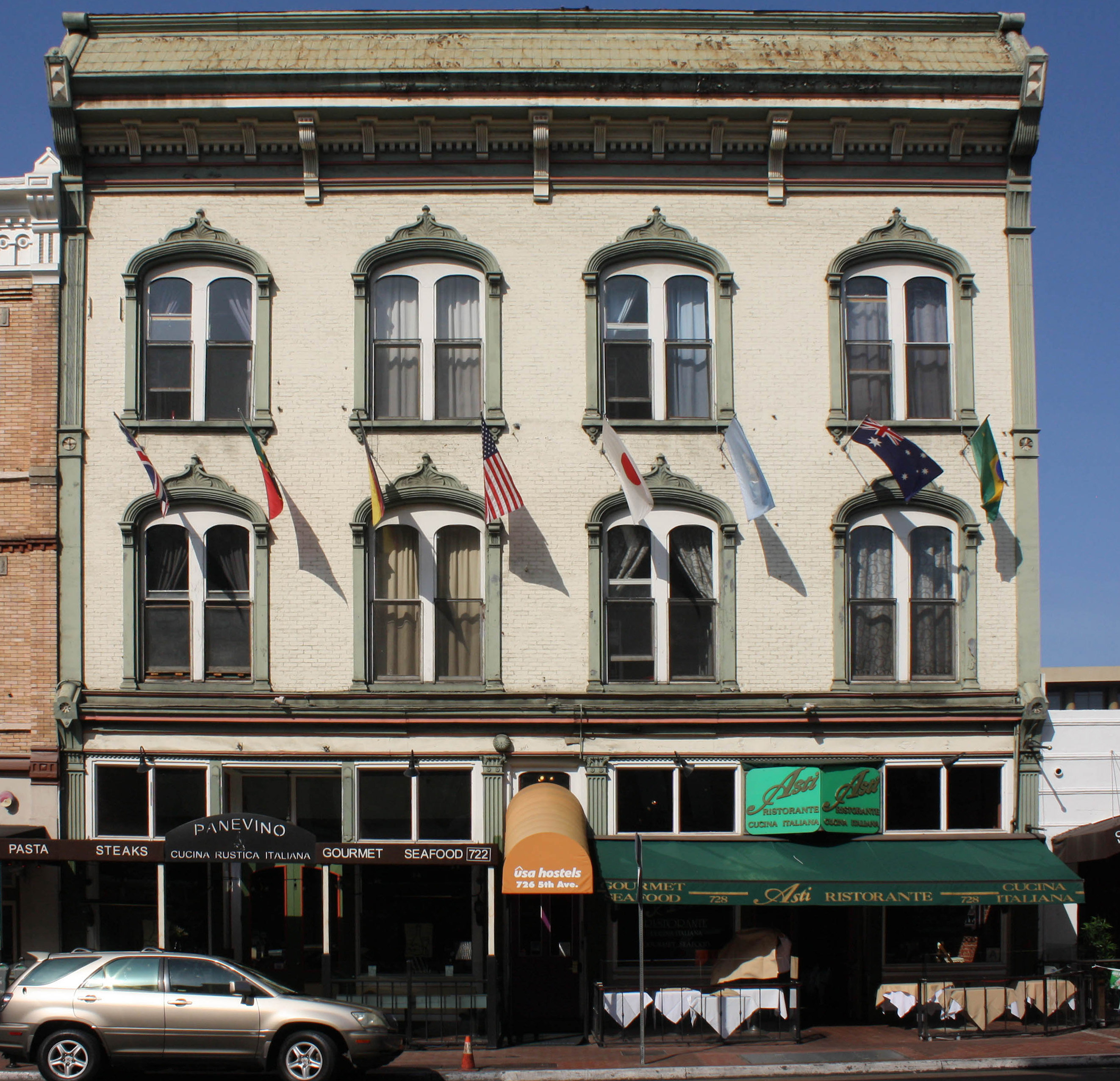
- The building in 2013
- Interactive map of the Llewelyn Building area

General information
- Location: 722 5th Avenue, San Diego, United States
- Coordinates: 32°42′46.7″N 117°9′37.4″W
- Opened: 1887

The Llewelyn Building is an historic structure located at 722 5th Avenue in the Gaslamp Quarter, San Diego, in the U.S. state of California. It was built in 1887.

== See also ==
- List of Gaslamp Quarter historic buildings
- List of San Diego Historic Landmarks
