= Buel–Town Building =

Historic building in San Diego, California, U.S.

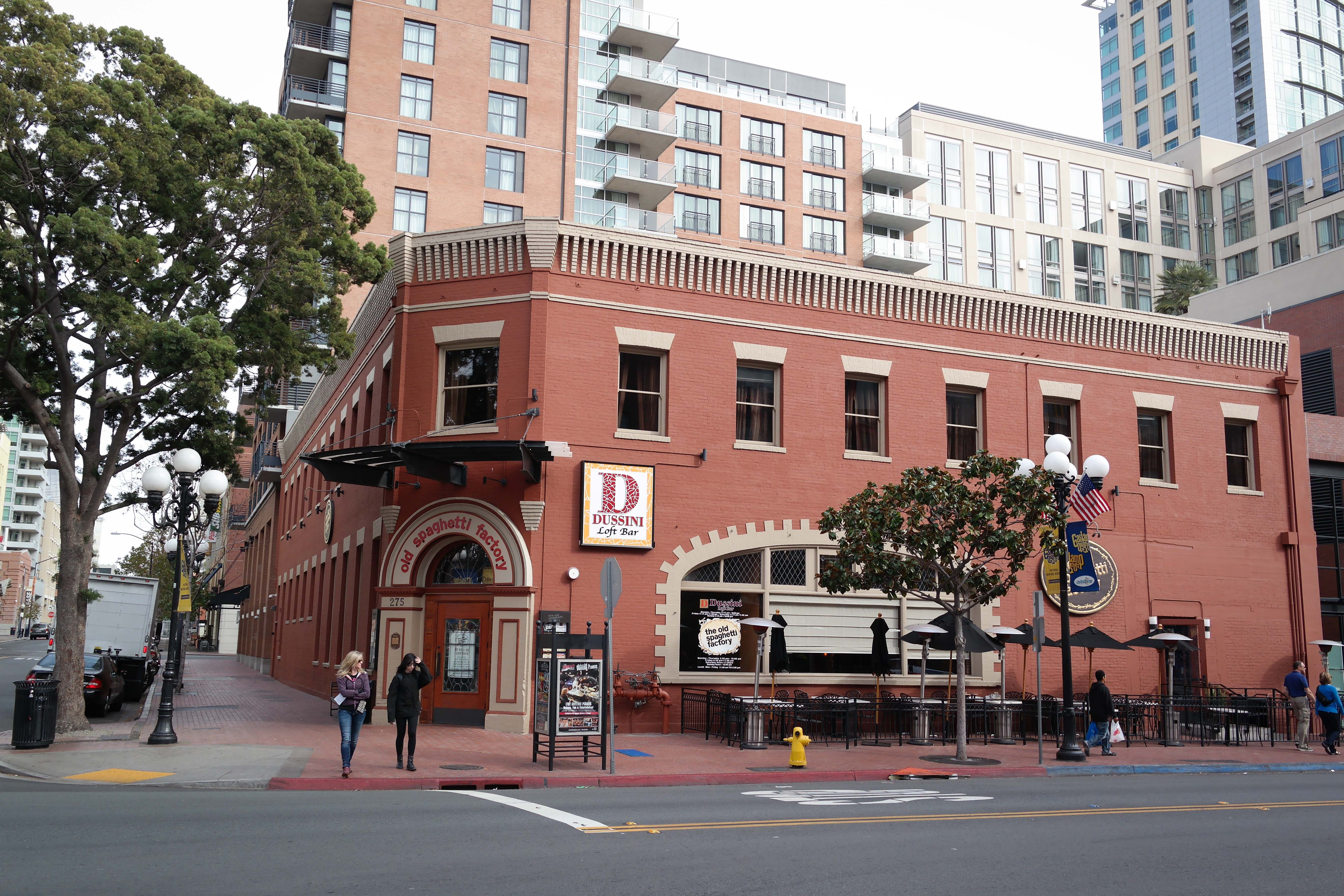
- The building's exterior in 2014
- Interactive map of the Buel–Town Building area

General information
- Location: 278 5th Avenue, San Diego, California, United States
- Coordinates: 32.708219°N 117.159979°W

The Buel–Town Building is an historic structure located at 278 5th Avenue in San Diego's Gaslamp Quarter, in the U.S. state of California. It was built in 1898.

The Buel–Town Building was the first Gaslamp Quarter building to be rehabilitated, in 1973, kicking off the rejuvenation of this neighborhood near San Diego's downtown; from then it housed the Old Spaghetti Factory restaurant.

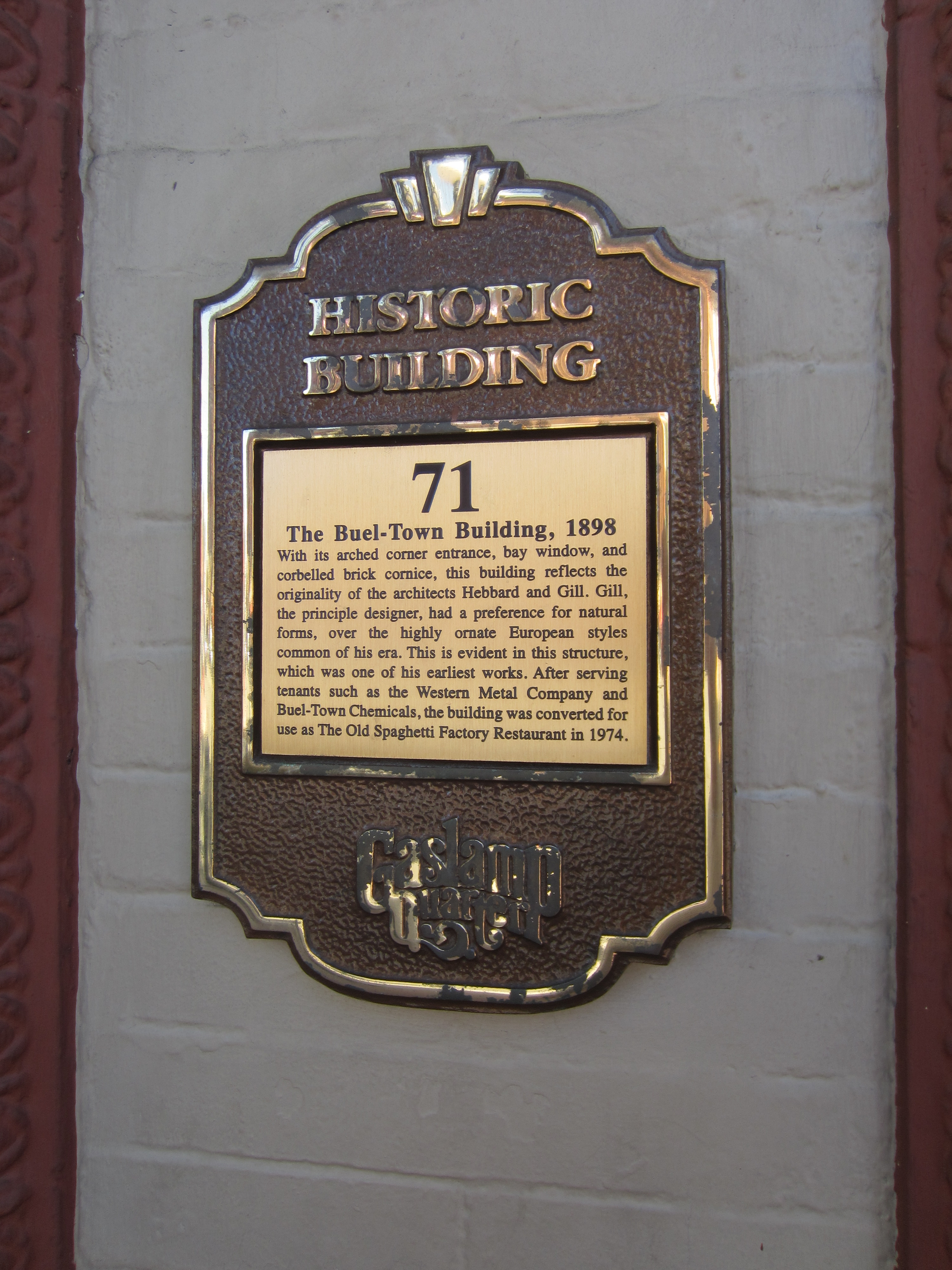
Plaque for the building, 2016

== See also ==
- List of Gaslamp Quarter historic buildings
