= Nesmith–Greely Building =

Historic building in San Diego, California, U.S.

Coordinates: 32.71408°N 117.1599°W

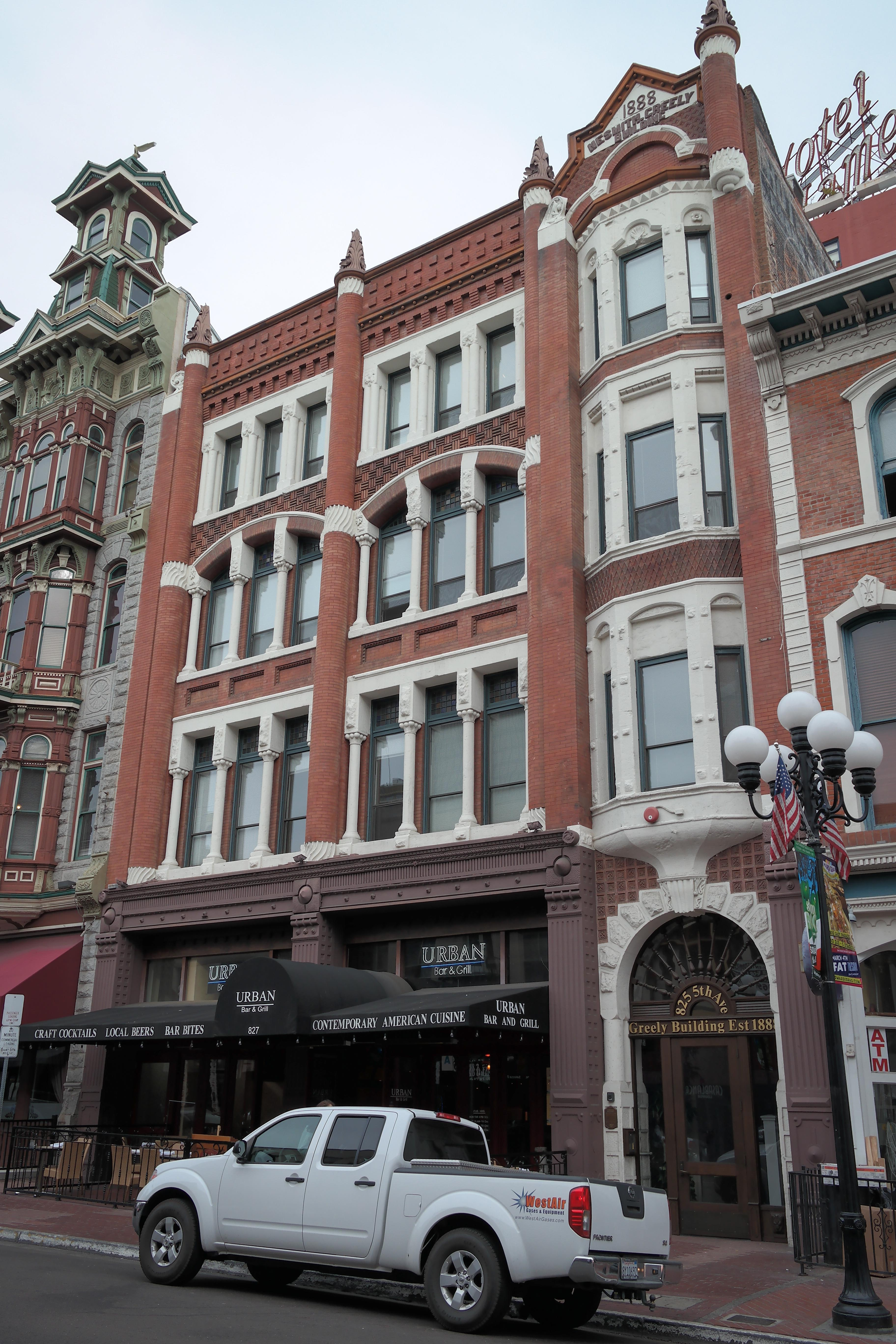
- Interactive map of the Nesmith–Greely Building area

General information
- Location: San Diego, California, United States

The Nesmith–Greely Building is a four-story historic structure located at 825 5th Avenue in San Diego's Gaslamp Quarter, in the U.S. state of California. It was built in 1888. It is located next to the Louis Bank of Commerce.

== History ==
The building was designed by N.A. Comstock and Carl Trotsche. The construction cost was $32,000 ($1146667 today). The building's interior was refurbished in 1971.

== See also ==
- List of Gaslamp Quarter historic buildings
