= Backesto Building =

Historic building in San Diego, California, U.S.

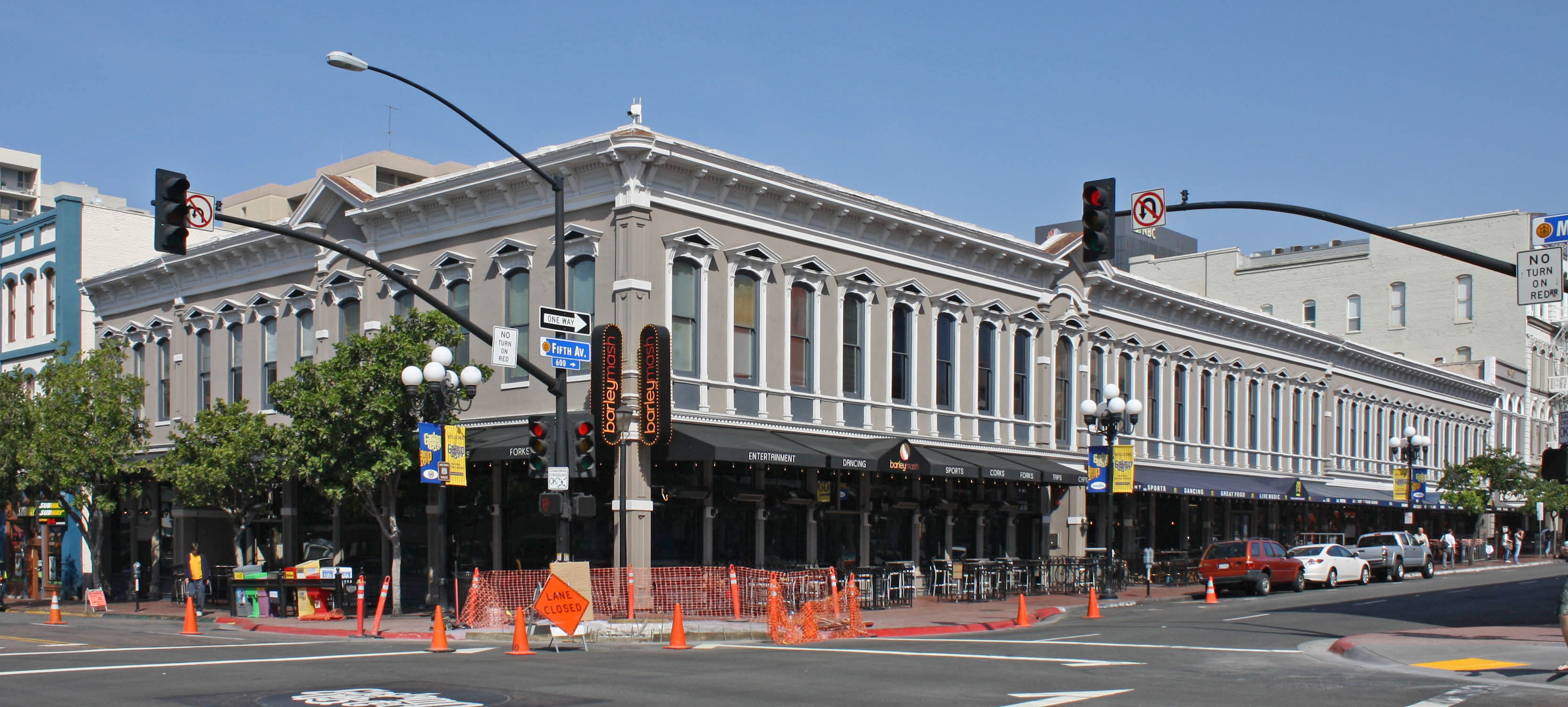
- The building's exterior in 2013
- Interactive map of the Backesto Building area

General information
- Location: 614 5th Avenue, San Diego, California, United States
- Coordinates: 32.711922°N 117.160411°W

The Backesto Building, or Backesto Block, is a historic structure located at 614 5th Avenue in the Gaslamp Quarter, San Diego, in the U.S. state of California. It was built in 1873 by John Backesto.

== See also ==
- List of Gaslamp Quarter historic buildings
