= Spruce Street Suspension Bridge =

Bridge in California

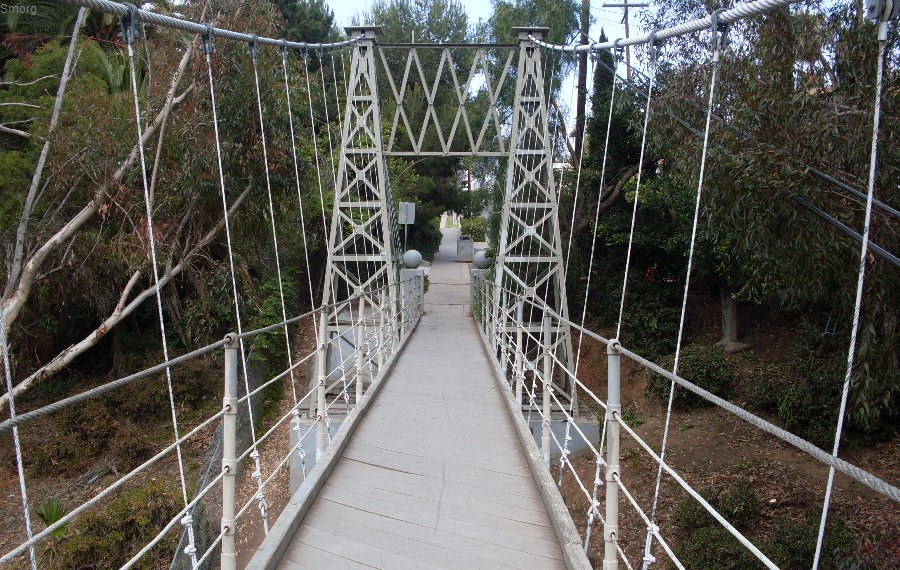
- The bridge in 2009
- Coordinates: 32.7387°N 117.1660°W
- Crosses: Kate Sessions Canyon
- Owner: City of San Diego

Characteristics
- Design: Simple suspension bridge
- Material: Cables, concrete
- Total length: 375 ft (114 m)
- Width: 5 ft (1.5 m)
- Height: 70 ft (21 m)

History
- Architect: Edwin M. Capps
- Built: 1912

San Diego Historic Landmark
- Designated: January 7, 1977
- Reference no.: 116

The Spruce Street Suspension Bridge, colloquially known as the Wiggly Bridge, is a historic 375 ft (114 m) long footbridge in the Bankers Hill neighborhood of San Diego, California. It was built in 1912 by Edwin M. Capps. It can hold a maximum of 327,900 lb (148,700 kg) and crosses Kate Sessions Canyon. It was designated a San Diego Historic Landmark in 1977.

== History ==
Edwin M. Capps, a two-time mayor of San Diego, designed the bridge in 1911 to allow pedestrians to cross Kate Sessions Canyon, which separated neighborhoods from the Fourth and Fifth Avenues' streetcar lines. It also connected Bankers Hill to eastern schools. The bridge was built in 1912.

In 1976, the city reported that the bridge was checked for damages every three months, as flanges were occasionally broken due to people swinging the bridge back and forth. These flanges are not crucial to the bridge's survival, so it is not very important if they are damaged.

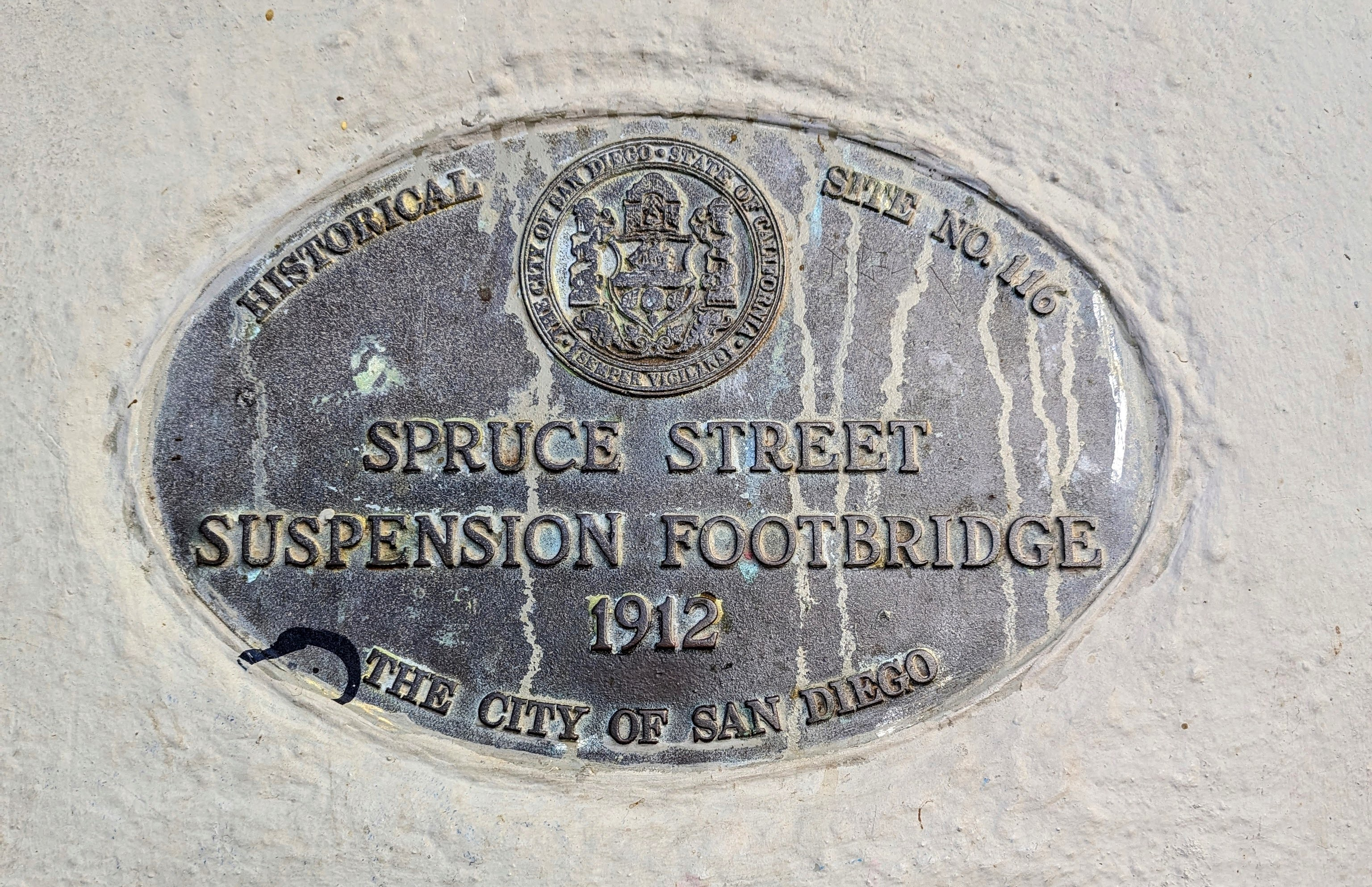
Spruce Street Suspension Bridge, Historical Site #116, San Diego, CA.

The bridge was closed from April 2020 to February 2021 due to the COVID-19 pandemic.
