= Louis Bank of Commerce =

Historic building in San Diego, California, U.S.

Coordinates: 32.71424°N 117.160039°W

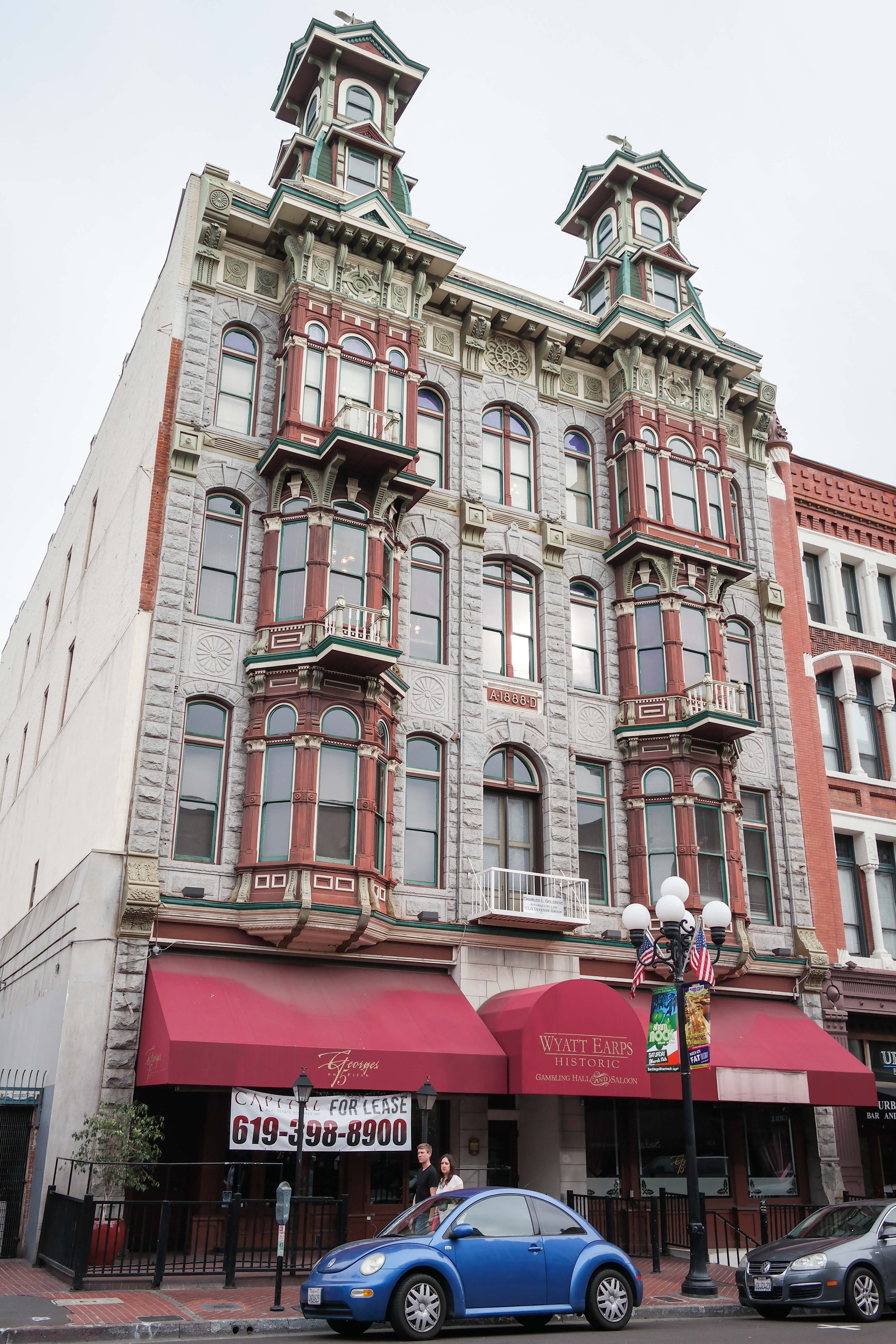
- The building's exterior in 2014
- Interactive map of the Louis Bank of Commerce area

General information
- Type: Bank
- Location: 835 5th Avenue, San Diego, United States
- Opened: 1887

The Louis Bank of Commerce building is an historic structure located at 835-837 5th Avenue in San Diego's Gaslamp Quarter, in the U.S. state of California. It was built in 1887. It is a four story Baroque Revival building with twin rising towers. This is the first granite building in San Diego that was pre-built on the east coast and shipped around Cape Horn to California.The Louis Bank of Commerce was located here until 1893, then Isidor Louis opened an oyster bar, a favorite of Wyatt Earp.

== See also ==
- List of Gaslamp Quarter historic buildings
- List of San Diego Historic Landmarks
