= Royal Pie Bakery =

Historic building in San Diego, California, U.S.

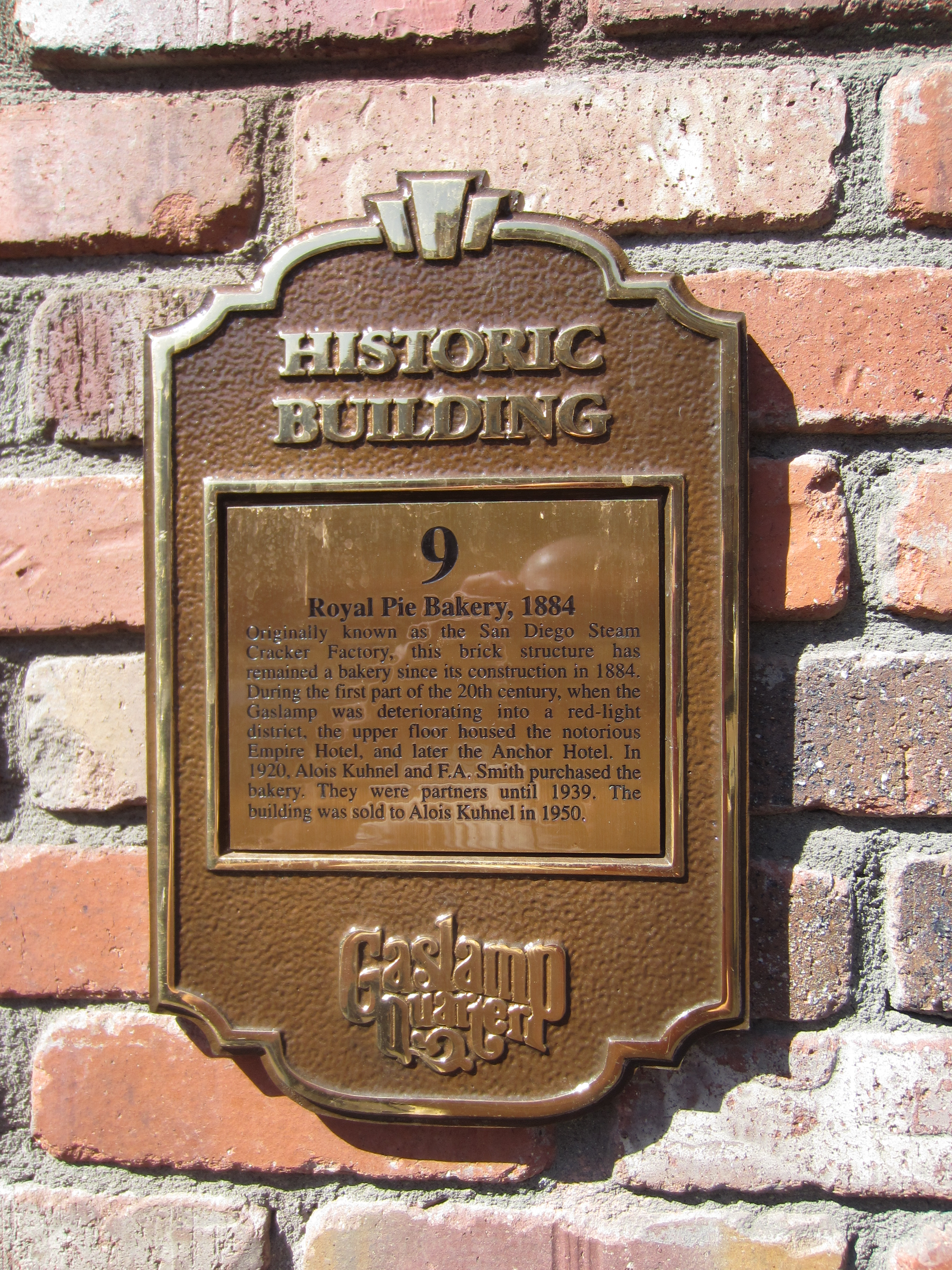
- Plaque for the building, 2016
- Interactive map of the Royal Pie Bakery area

General information
- Type: Bakery
- Location: 554 4th Avenue, San Diego, United States
- Coordinates: 32°42′40″N 117°09′41″W
- Opened: 1884

The Royal Pie Bakery is an historic structure located at 554 4th Avenue in the Gaslamp Quarter, San Diego, in the U.S. state of California. It was built in 1884.

== History ==
When the bakery was first built, it was known as the San Diego Steam Cracker Factory, and made crackers for use on ships travelling from the Port of San Diego. In 1899 the building was sold to J. Millender, who leased it to a series of bakers whilst using the upper storeys of the building as residential or hotel rooms. The building was sold again in 1920 to Alois Kuhnel and Francis Smith, who ran the Royal Pie Bakery. When Alois Kuhnel died the bakery was taken over by his son, Alex Kuhnel, who ran the bakery as a trade supplier. The bakery closed in 1998 when Alex Kuhnel died, and the building now hosts an Irish pub and restaurant.

== See also ==
- List of Gaslamp Quarter historic buildings
