= Hubbell Building (San Diego) =

Historic building in San Diego, California, U.S.

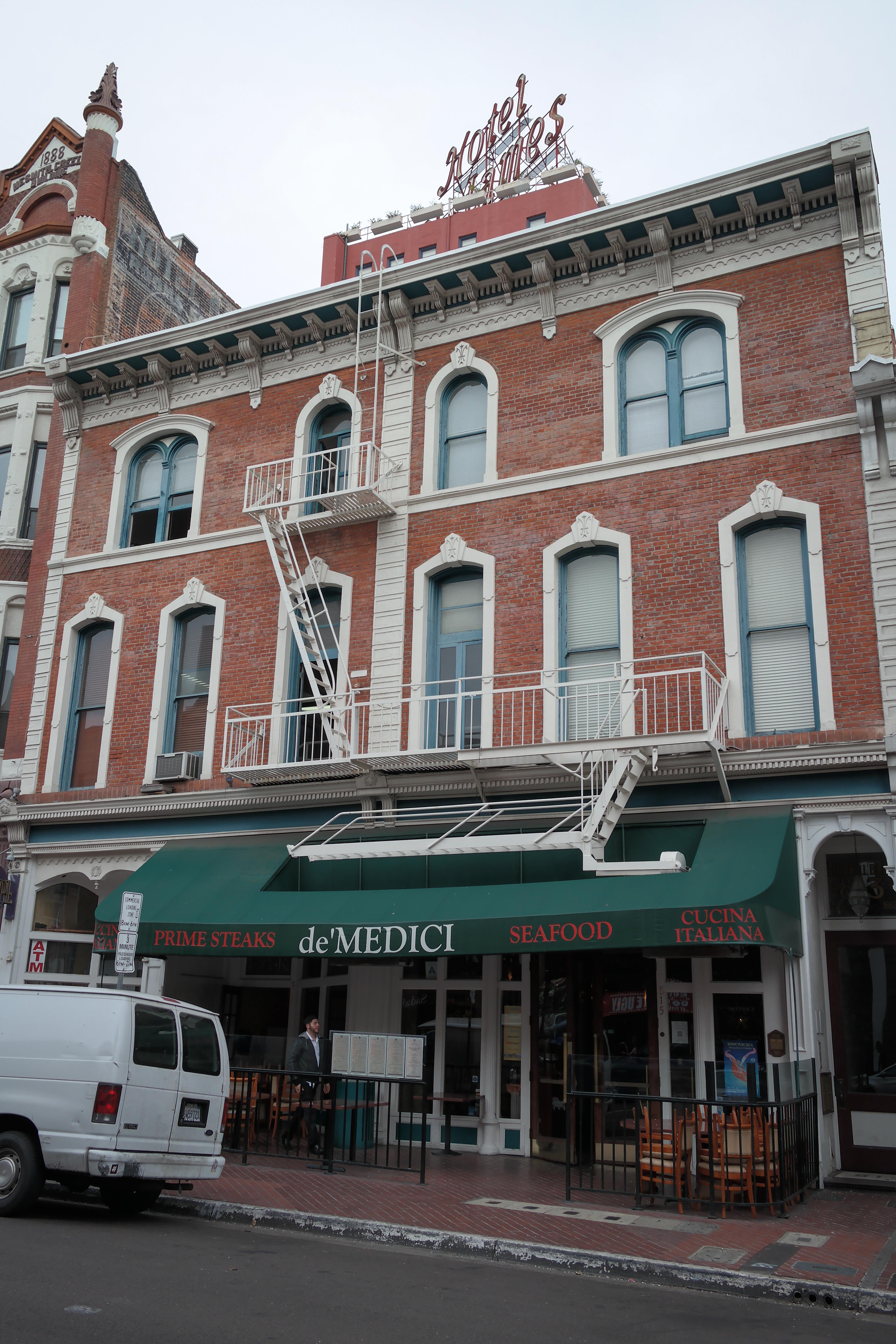
- The building's exterior in 2014
- Interactive map of the Hubbell Building area

General information
- Location: 813-823 5th Avenue, San Diego, United States
- Coordinates: 32.71395°N 117.15995°W
- Opened: 1886

The Hubbell Building is an historic structure located at 813-823 5th Avenue in San Diego's Gaslamp Quarter, in the U.S. state of California. Construction began in 1886 and completed in 1887.

== See also ==
- List of Gaslamp Quarter historic buildings
- List of San Diego Historic Landmarks
