= Watts–Robinson Building =

Historic building in San Diego, California, U.S.

Coordinates: 32.714848°N 117.159928°W

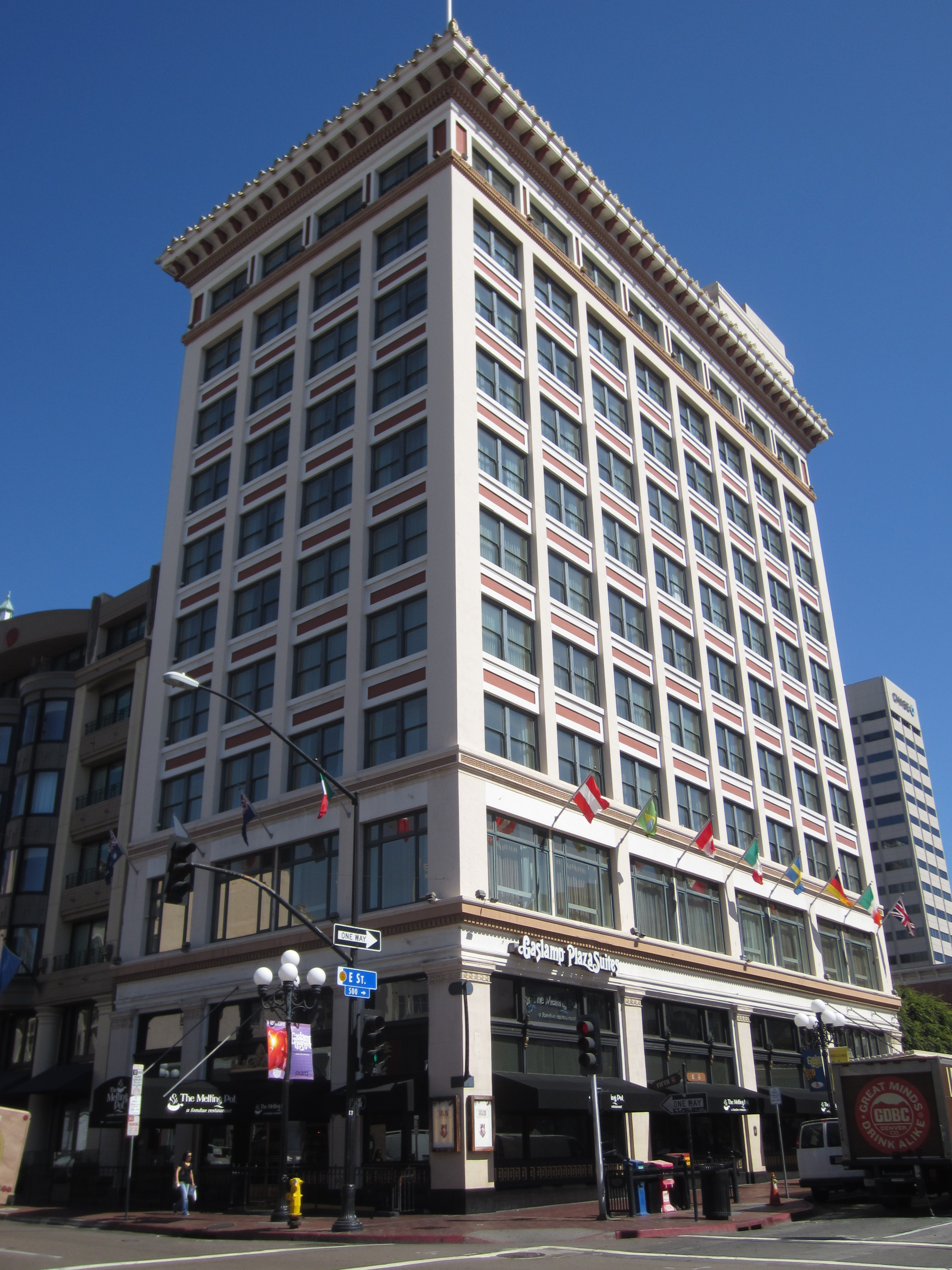
- Interactive map of the Watts–Robinson Building area

General information
- Location: San Diego, California, U.S.
- Completed: 1913
- Opened: 1913

The Watts–Robinson Building (also known as Gaslamp Plaza Suites and the New Watts Building) is an historic building in San Diego's Gaslamp Quarter, in the U.S. state of California. It was completed in 1913.

== See also ==
- List of Gaslamp Quarter historic buildings
