= Adobe Falls =

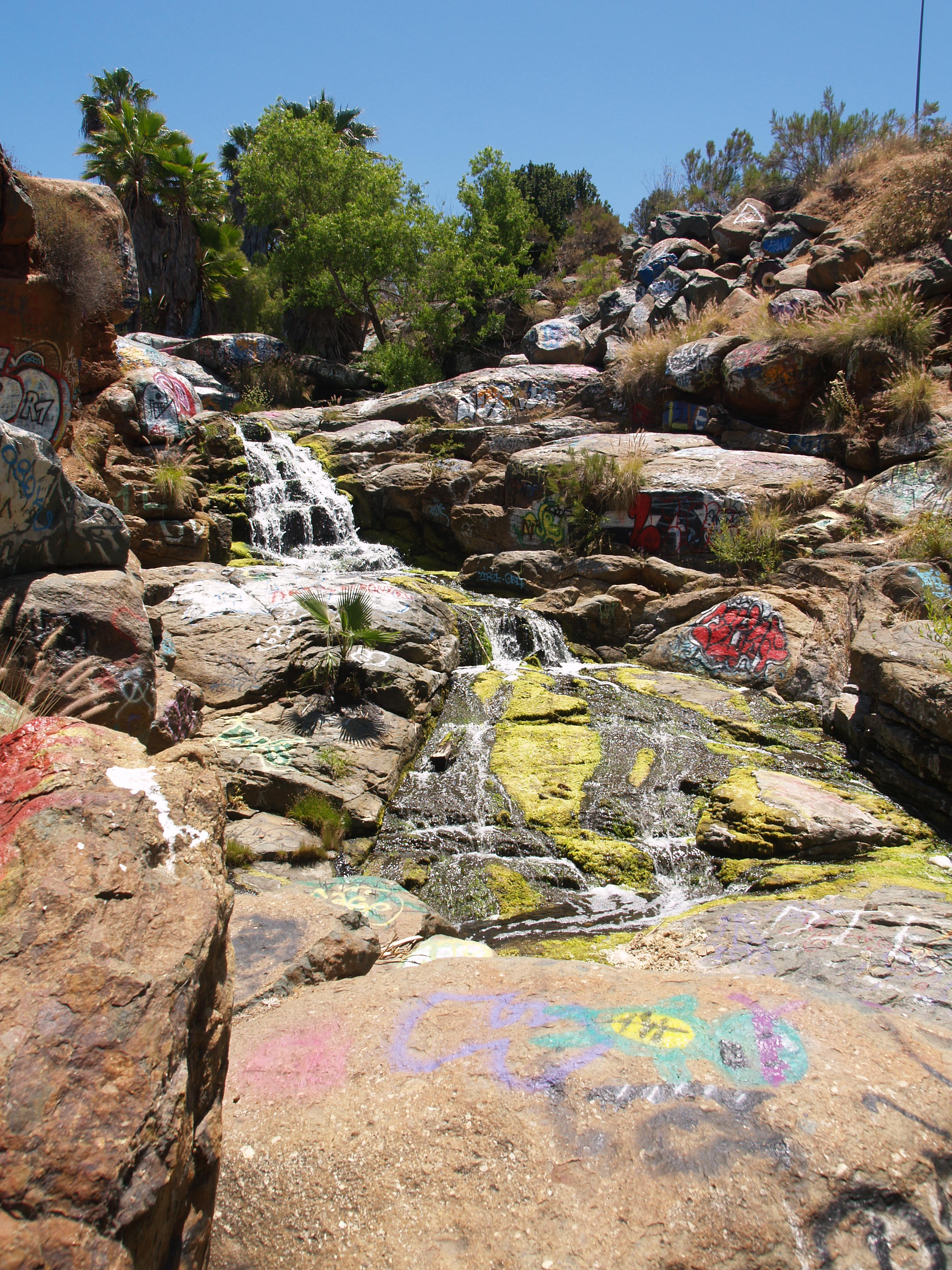

- Location within California
- 32°46′48″N 117°4′13″W
- Location: San Diego, California

Site notes
- Owner: San Diego State University

San Diego Historic Landmark
- Designated: April 6, 1973
- Reference no.: 80

Adobe Falls is a seasonal waterfall on a tributary of the San Diego River. The area is owned and managed by San Diego State University (SDSU). It is a popular natural tourist attraction, though there is no legal public access to this location. The San Diego Historical Resources Board declared the falls a historic landmark in 1973 (San Diego Historic Landmark #80).

== See also ==
- List of San Diego Historic Landmarks
- List of waterfalls
- List of waterfalls in California
