= Emmet House Site =

Historic site in California, United States

Coordinates: 32.751909°N 117.197141°W

The Emmet House Site is a historical landmark designated by the San Diego, California, government Historical Resources Board. The original construction started in the 1860s. Emmet House Site was constructed as a rooming house and restaurant and was later the location of San Diego's first County Hospital. The hospital operated during the 1870s. A coffin was stolen from the building in 1883. The building was demolished in 1949 but a historical marker has been placed at its original location.

It is one of over a dozen landmarks designated by the Historical Resources Board on November 4, 1970.
