= Gaslamp Quarter, San Diego =

- Gaslamp Quarter Historic District
- U.S. National Register of Historic Places
- U.S. Historic district
- San Diego Historic Landmark
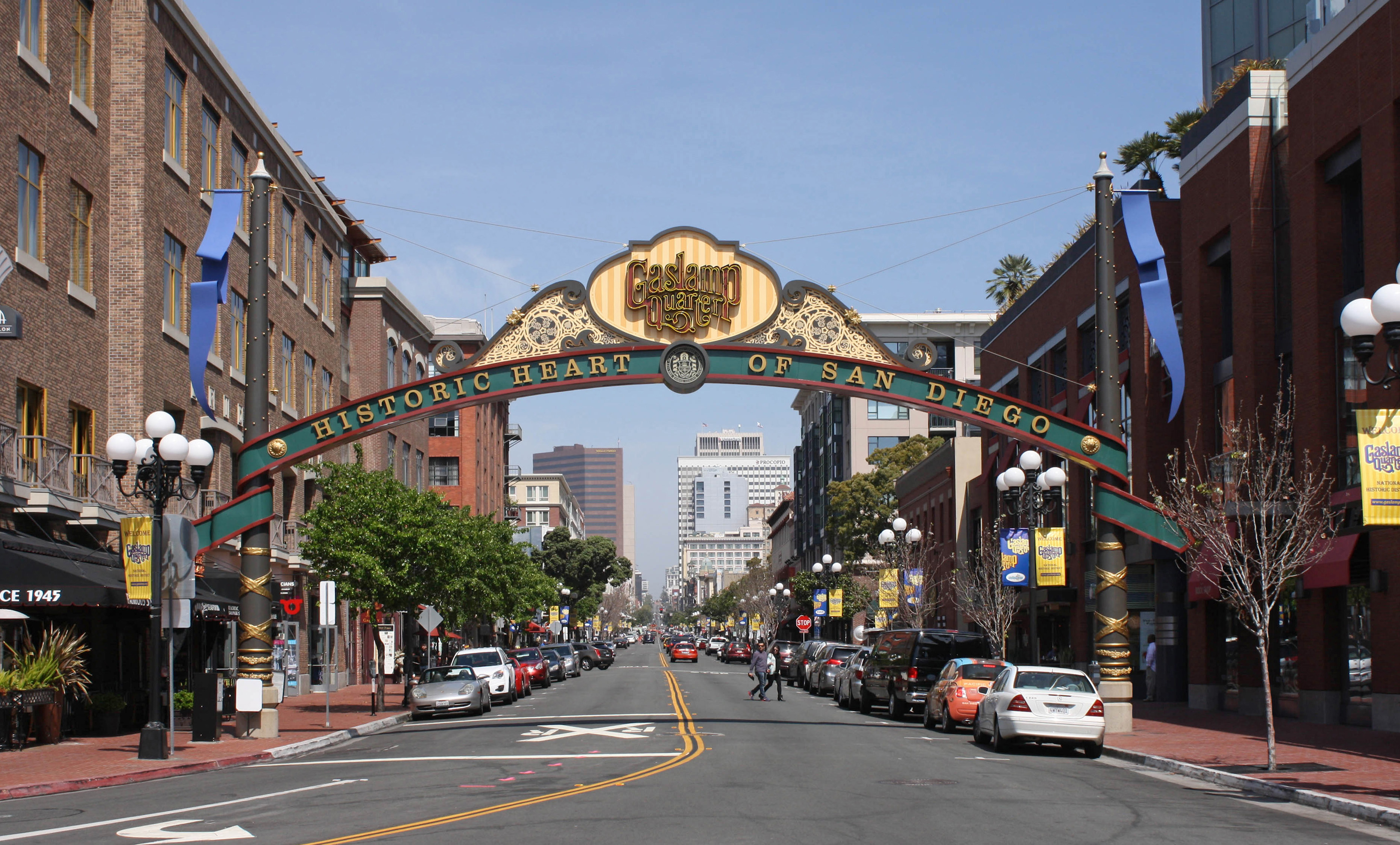

- Location within San Diego Location within San Diego County, California Location within California Location within the United States
- Location: Bounded by RR tracks, Broadway, 4th, and 6th Aves., San Diego, California
- Coordinates: 32°42′42″N 117°9′33″W
- Area: 38 acres (15 ha)
- Architect: Multiple
- Architectural style: Late Victorian, Art Deco
- NRHP reference No.: 80000841
- SDHL No.: 127

Significant dates
- Added to NRHP: May 23, 1980
- Designated SDHL: June 2, 1978

The Gaslamp Quarter is a historic neighborhood in downtown San Diego, California. It extends from Broadway to Harbor Drive and from 4th to 6th Avenue. The neighborhood is listed as a historic district on the National Register of Historic Places as the Gaslamp Quarter Historic District. It includes over 90 historic buildings, most of which were constructed in the Victorian era; many are in use as restaurants, shops, entertainment venues, and nightclubs.

The Gaslamp Quarter is known for its nightlife. It is the site of various events and festivals, including Mardi Gras in the Gaslamp, Taste of Gaslamp, and ShamROCK, a St. Patrick's Day event. Petco Park, home of the San Diego Padres, is one block away in the East Village neighborhood.

== History ==
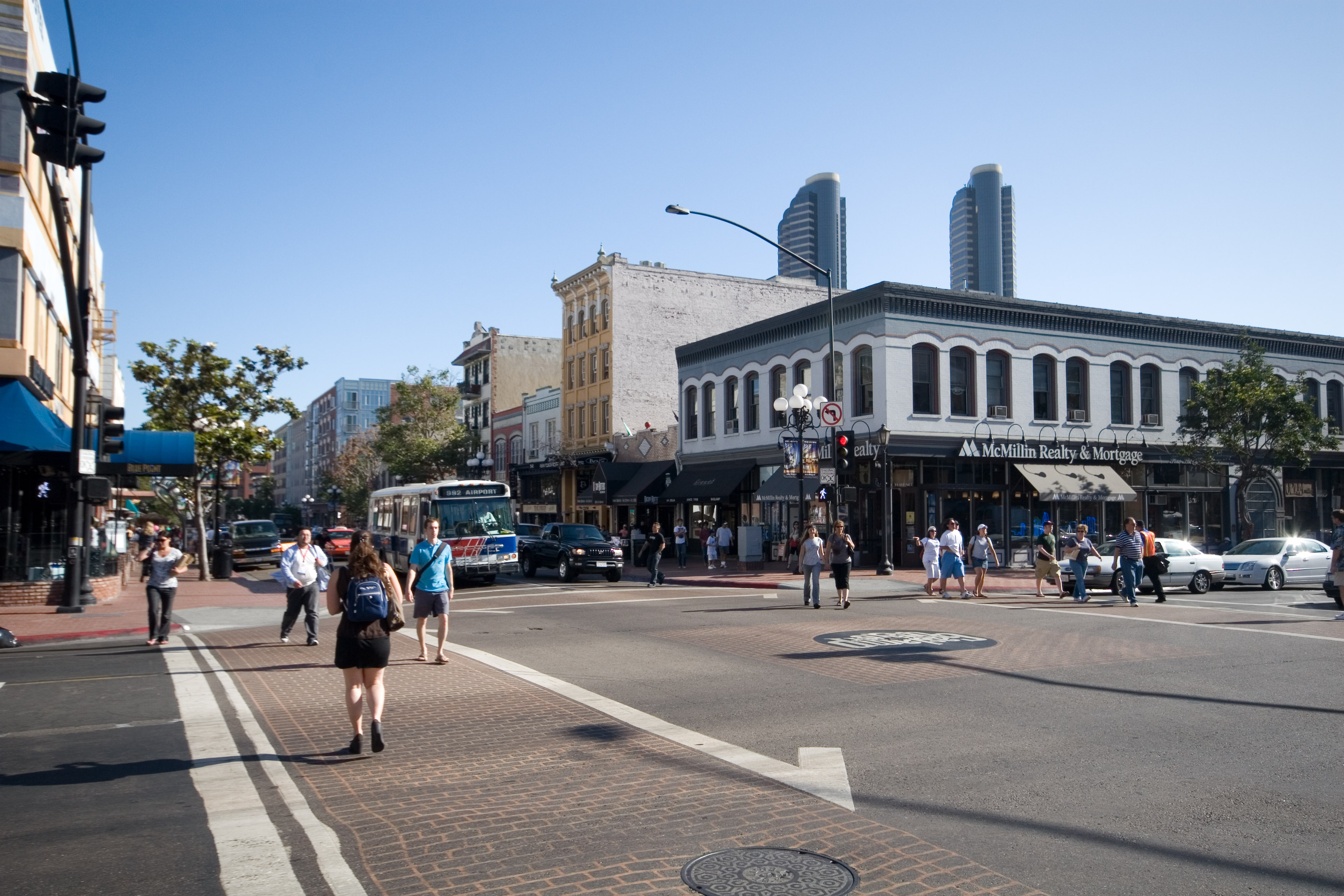
Corner in the Quarter

In the 1860s, the area was known as New Town, in contrast to Old Town, the original Spanish colonial settlement of San Diego. Intensive development began in 1867, when Alonzo Horton bought the land in hopes of creating a new city center closer to the bay, and chose 5th Avenue as its main street.

After a period of urban decay, the neighborhood underwent urban renewal in the 1980s and 1990s.

It was rebranded the "Gaslamp Quarter" during the redevelopment and preservation efforts that occurred during the 1980s, though the streets were generally lit by arc lights, not gaslamps.

During July 2026 Comic-Con, Marvel’s advertising agency was fined $160,000 for installing an unpermitted advertisement wrap on the Gaslamp Quarter sign. City officials sent a letter threatening to terminate their contract with the Gaslamp Quarter Association after evidence suggested its director accepted an illegal $10,000 payment to approve the ad. The director claimed he did nothing wrong and blamed the ad agency for not getting the permits. If he is lying, The association could lose over $180,000 in city funding.

== Timeline ==
- 1850: William Heath Davis bought 160 acres (0.65 km^{2}) in what would eventually become the Gaslamp Quarter. Despite heavy investment from Davis, little development happened in this period.
- 1867: Real estate developer Alonzo Horton arrived in San Diego and purchased 800 acres (3.2 km^{2}) of land in New Town for $265. Major development began in the Gaslamp Quarter.
- 1880s to 1916: Known as the Stingaree, the area was a working class area, home to San Diego's first Chinatown, "Soapbox Row" and many saloons, gambling halls, and bordellos.
- 1912: Stingaree was the site of a free speech fight between socialists and city politicians which led to riots and the abduction by vigilantes of Emma Goldman's husband.
- 1916: the entire neighborhood of Stingaree was demolished and renamed by anti-vice campaigners.
- 1950s-1970s: The decaying Gaslamp Quarter became known as a "Sailor's Entertainment" district, with a high concentration of pornographic theaters, bookshops and massage parlors.
- 1970: Public interest in preserving buildings downtown started, especially in Gaslamp Quarter.
- 1976: The city adopted the Gaslamp Quarter Urban Design and Development Manual, aimed at preserving buildings in the area, and the redevelopment of Gaslamp Quarter as a national historic district.
- 1982: Gaslamp Quarter became the major focus of the redevelopments in downtown by the city of San Diego.
- 1992: Gaslamp Quarter Archway is installed and dedicated.

== See also ==
- List of Gaslamp Quarter historic buildings
- U.S. Grant Hotel
