= Alan John Factory =

Historic building in San Diego, California, U.S.

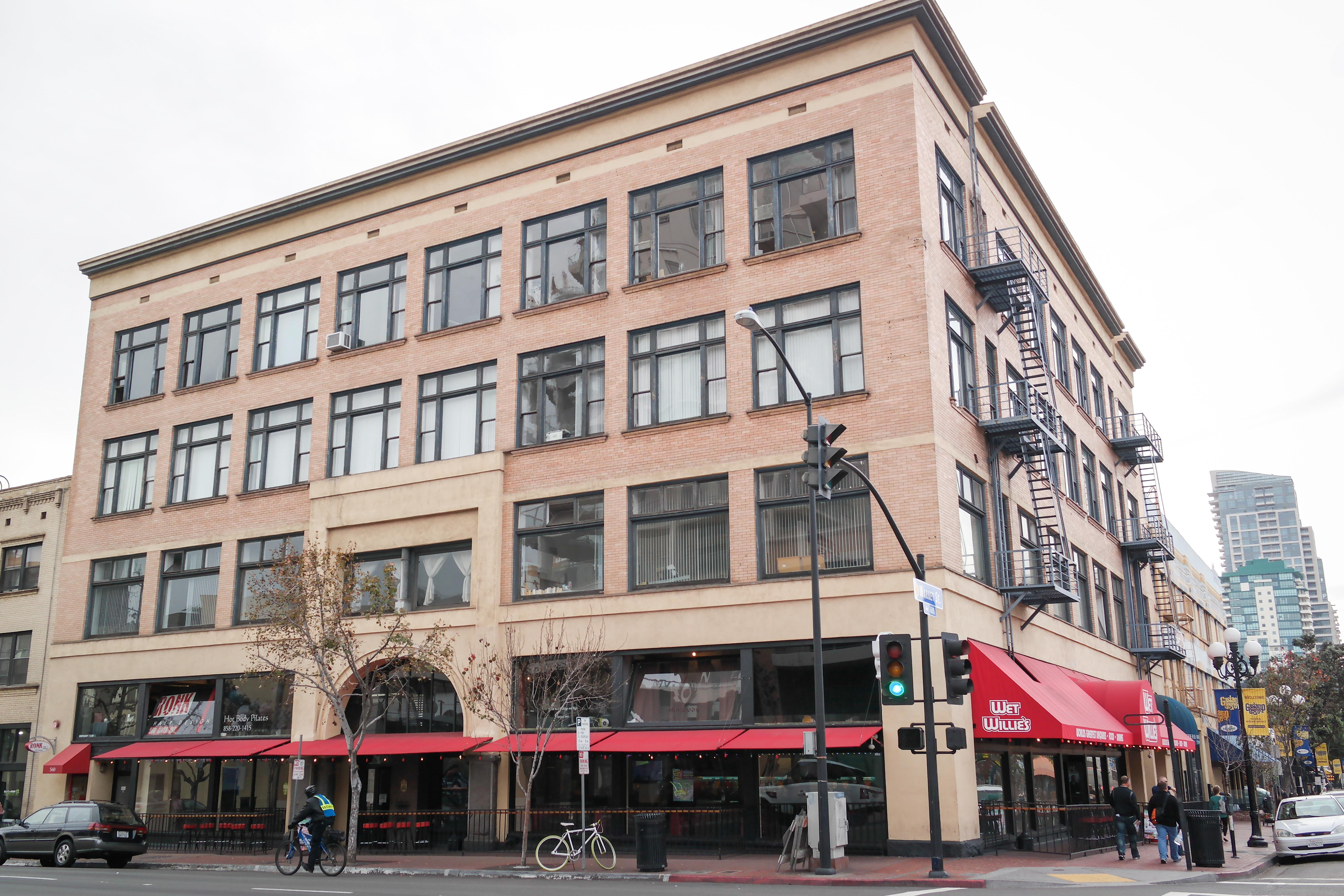
- The building's exterior in 2014
- Interactive map of the Alan John Factory area

General information
- Location: 568 6th Avenue, San Diego, California, United States
- Coordinates: 32.71123°N 117.1595°W

The Alan John Factory is a historic structure in the Gaslamp Quarter of San Diego, California. It was built in 1908 and is located at 568 6th Avenue.

The plaque says, "This four-story building is made of concrete with a pressed brick front, and a loft-like gallery on the first floor. In 1910, George Hazard and Elwyn Gould opened a hardware store here and later used it as a warehouse. Later, Krasne's Leather Goods and Guns operated on the ground floor, and the upper floors contained the Alan John Clothing Factory."

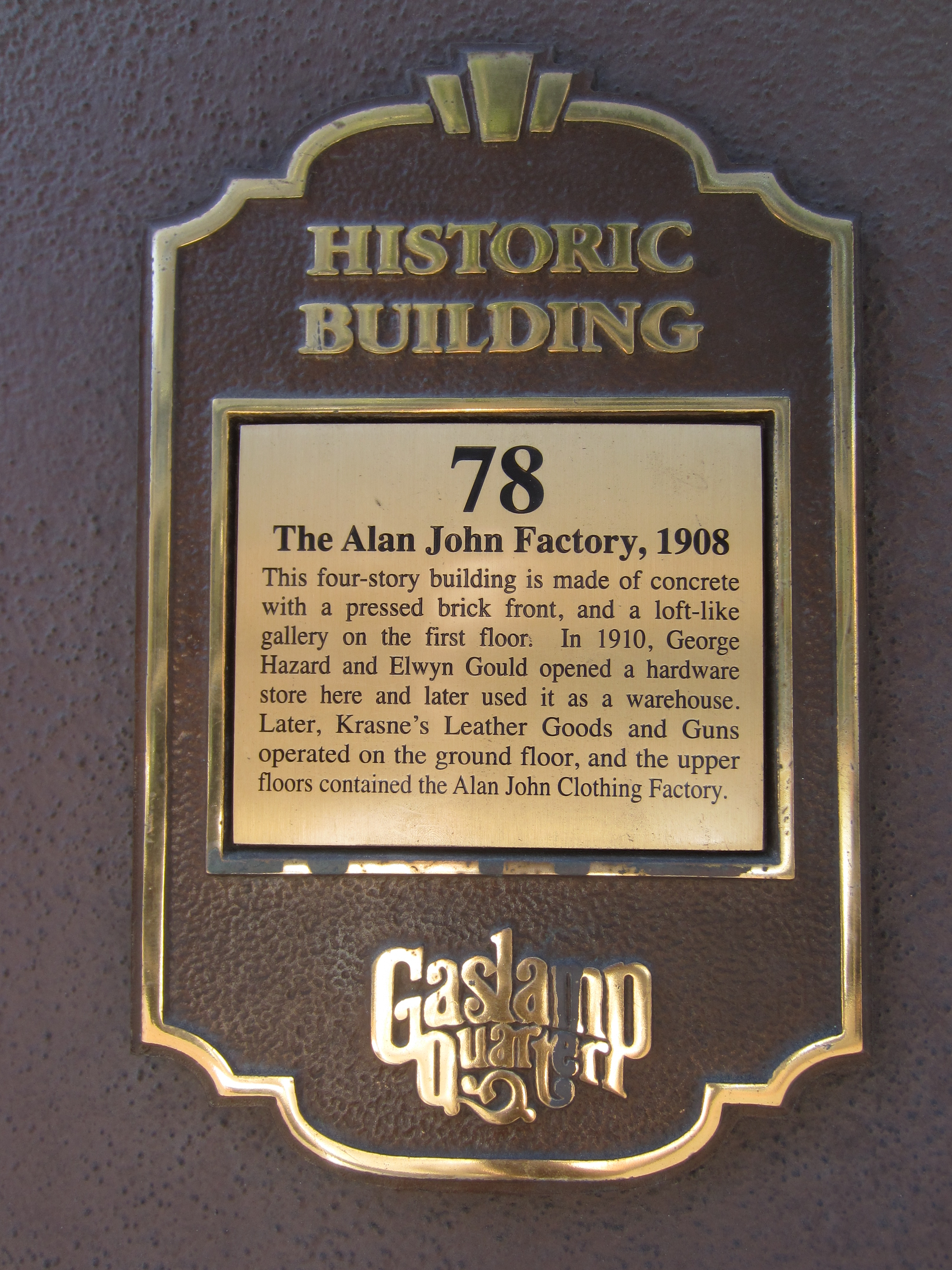
Plaque for the building, 2016

== See also ==
- List of Gaslamp Quarter historic buildings
