= Pioneer Warehouse =

Historic building in San Diego, California, U.S.

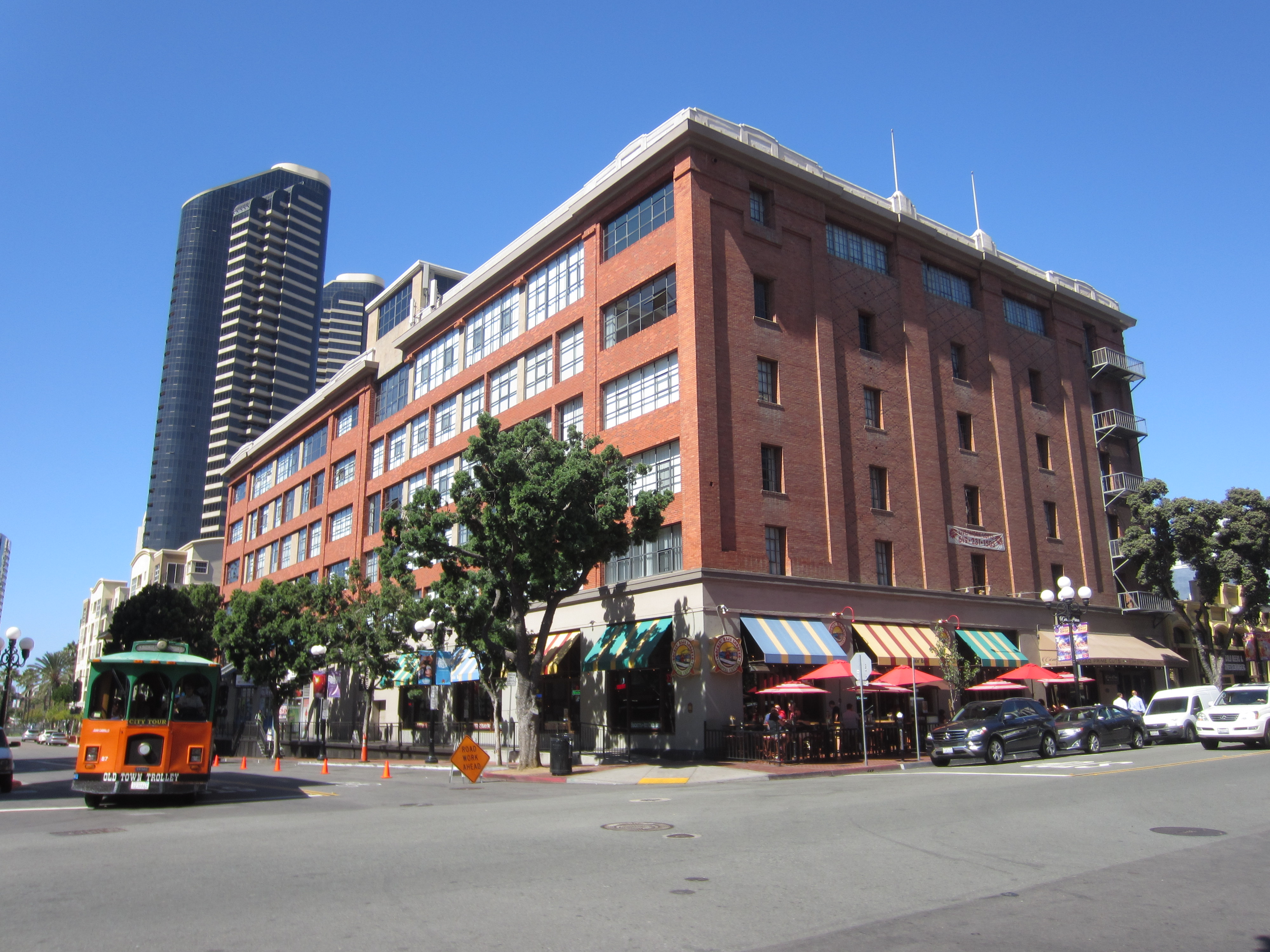
- The building's exterior in 2016
- Interactive map of the Pioneer Warehouse area

General information
- Location: 311 4th Avenue, San Diego, United States
- Coordinates: 32°42′31″N 117°9′38″W
- Opened: 1918

Pioneer Warehouse is a historic 1918 building, located at 311 4th Avenue, in San Diego, California. The warehouse was converted into apartments in 1990.

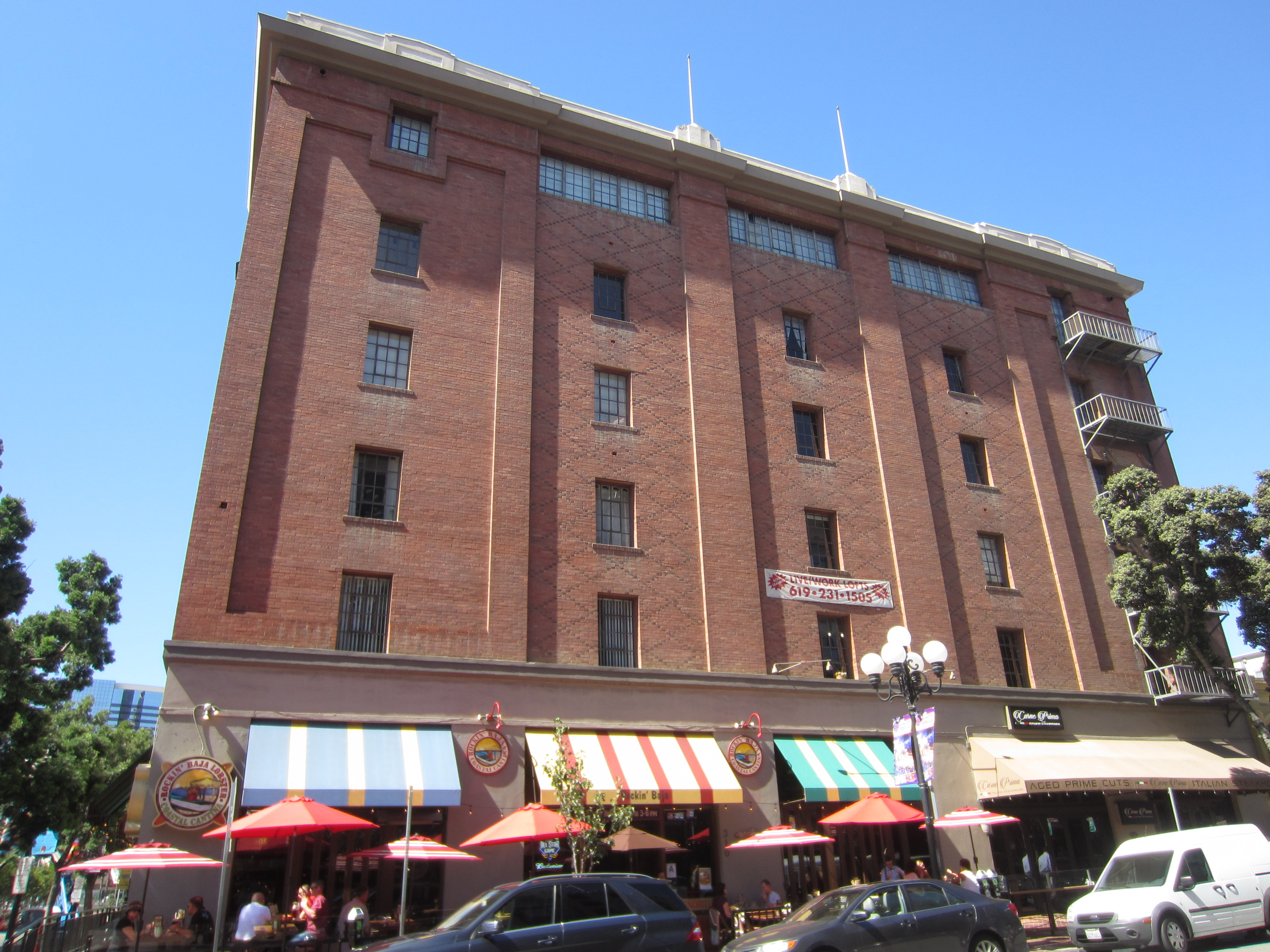
Exterior, 2016

== See also ==
- List of Gaslamp Quarter historic buildings
