= Frey Block =

Historic building in San Diego, California, U.S.

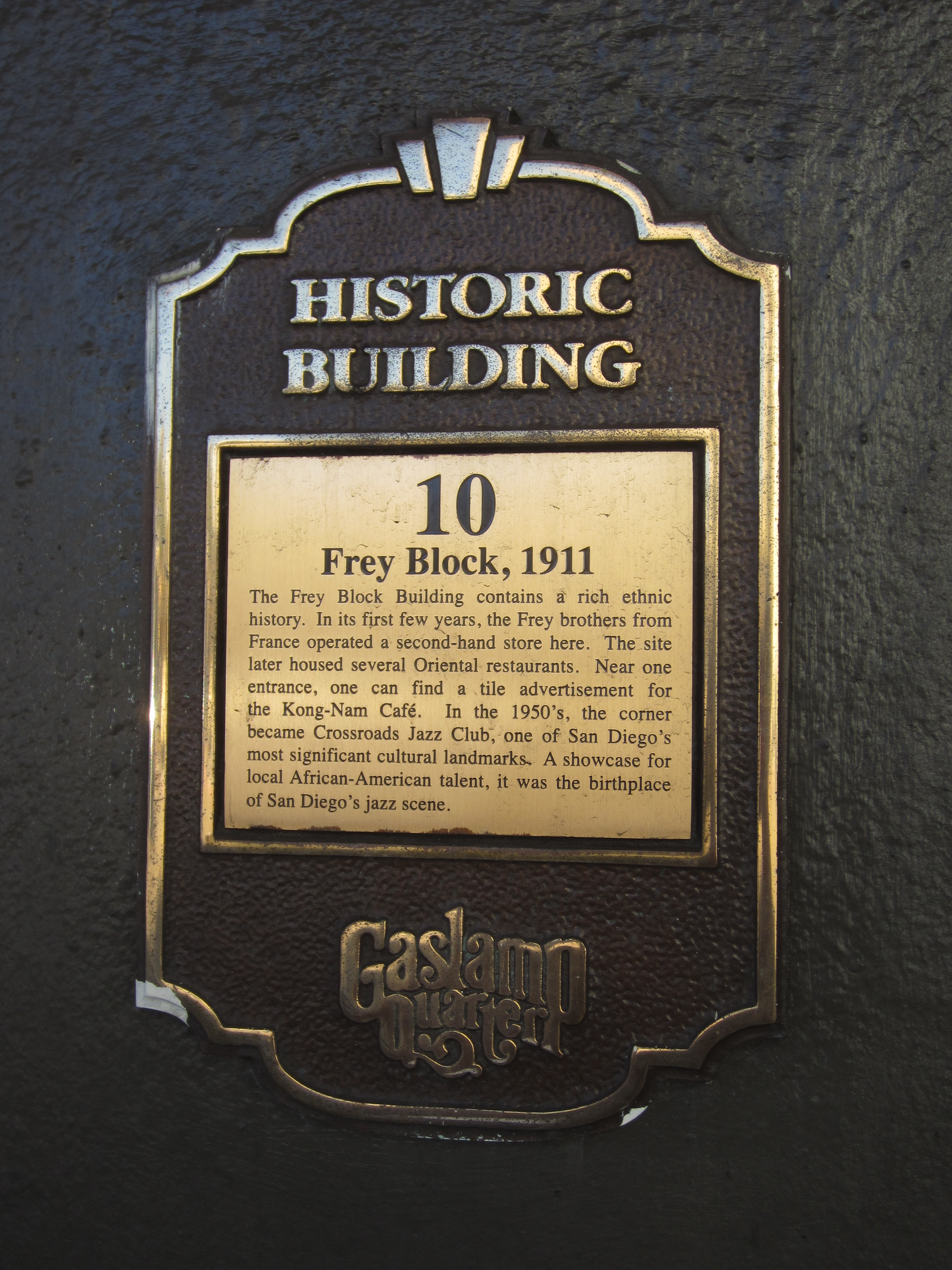
- Plaque for the building, 2016
- Interactive map of the Frey Block area

General information
- Architectural style: Modern
- Location: 345 Market Street, San Diego, United States
- Coordinates: 32.711360°N 117.161167°W
- Opened: 1911

Design and construction
- Architect: S.G. Kennedy

The Frey Block is an historic structure located at 345 Market Street in the Gaslamp Quarter, San Diego, in the U.S. state of California. It was built in 1911.

== See also ==
- List of Gaslamp Quarter historic buildings
