= Callan Hotel =

Historic building in San Diego, California, U.S.

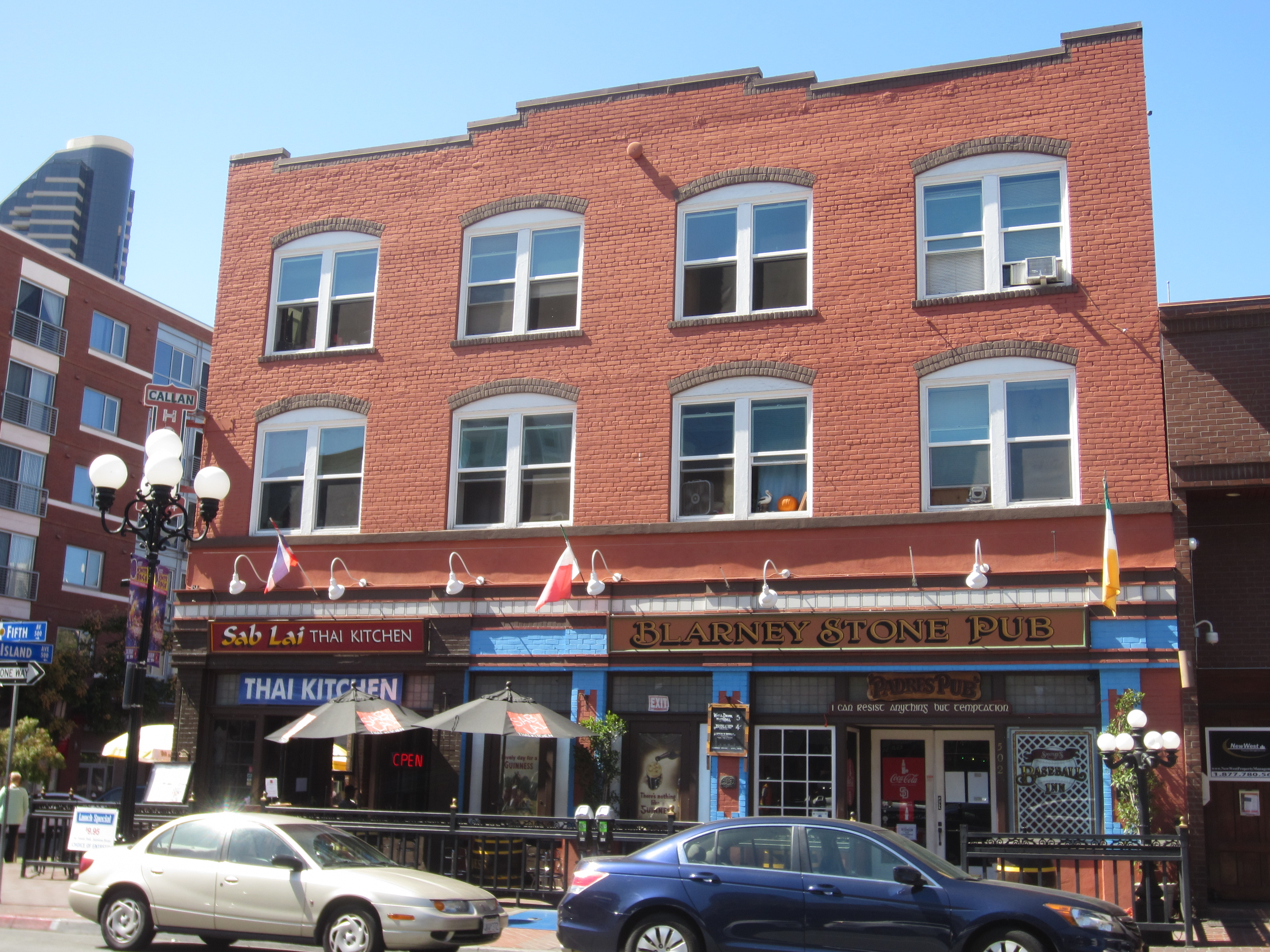
- The building's exterior in 2016
- Interactive map of the Callan Hotel area

General information
- Location: 502 5th Avenue, San Diego, California, United States
- Coordinates: 32.710568°N 117.160258°W

The Callan Hotel is an historic structure located at 502 5th Avenue in San Diego's Gaslamp Quarter, in the U.S. state of California. It was built in 1878.

== History ==
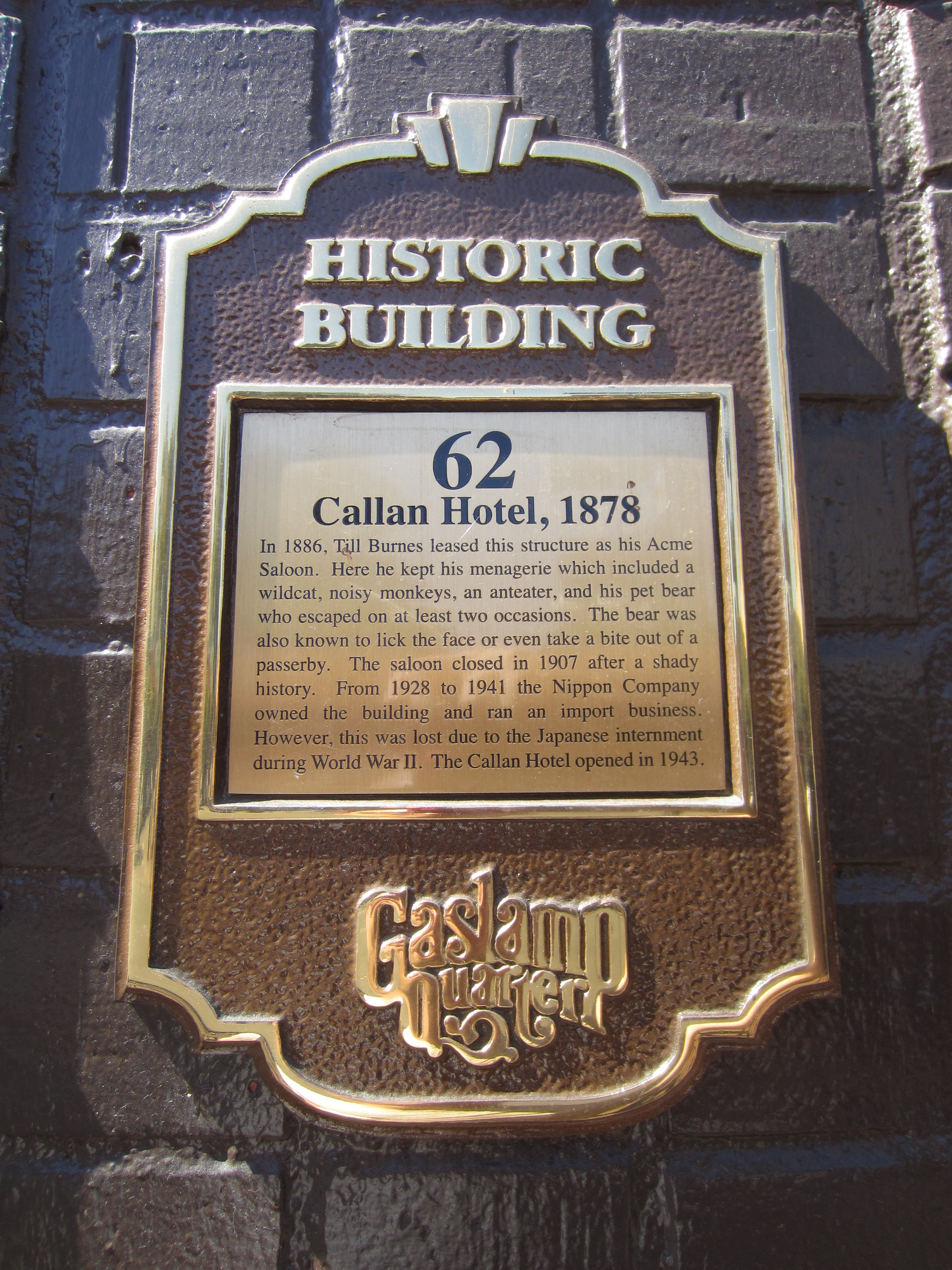
Plaque for the building, 2016

The building was erected by property owner William Llewelyn following a fire that had destroyed a previous building. Saloon owner Tillman Burns operated a menagerie to attract customers.

The Nippon Corporation, an import business, purchased the building in 1926. The ground floor served as a sales outlet while the upstairs operated as the Hotel Pacific. Here Japanese clients rented furnished rooms and office space. The Japanese Association of San Diego County kept their headquarters at the Hotel Pacific.

In 1941, all President Franklin D. Roosevelt signed Executive Order 9066, sending all Japanese to internment camps. The San Diego Savings and Loan Company took possession of the Hotel Pacific and renamed it the Hotel Callan.

== See also ==
- List of Gaslamp Quarter historic buildings
