= Timkin Building =

Historic building in San Diego, California, U.S.

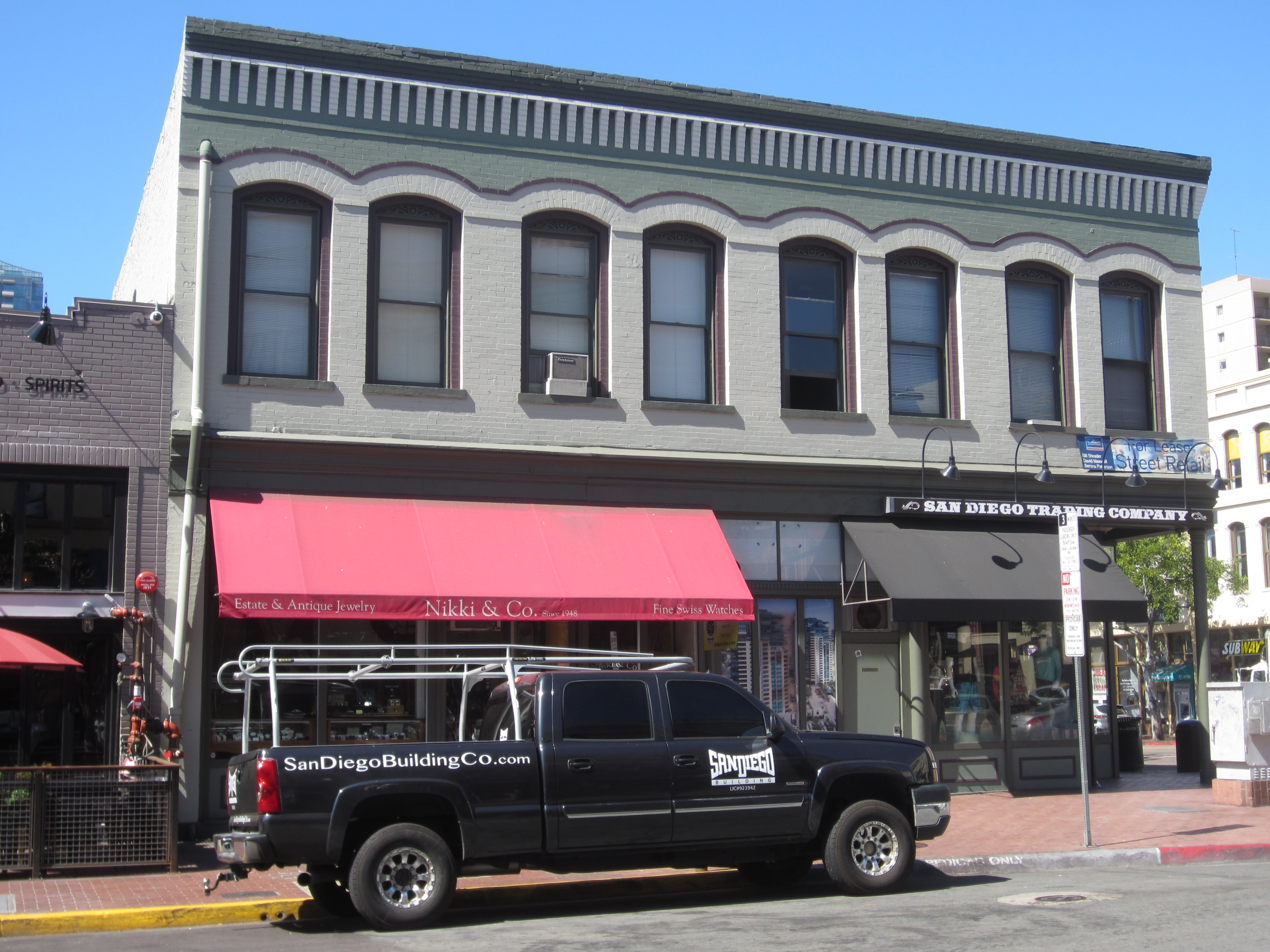
- The building's front exterior in 2016
- Interactive map of the Timkin Building area

General information
- Location: Gaslamp Quarter, San Diego, United States
- Coordinates: 32°42′40.7″N 117°9′37.5″W
- Completed: 1894

The Timkin Building is an historic building, completed in 1894, in San Diego's Gaslamp Quarter, in the U.S. state of California.

== See also ==
- List of Gaslamp Quarter historic buildings
