= Quin Building =

Historic building in San Diego, California, U.S.

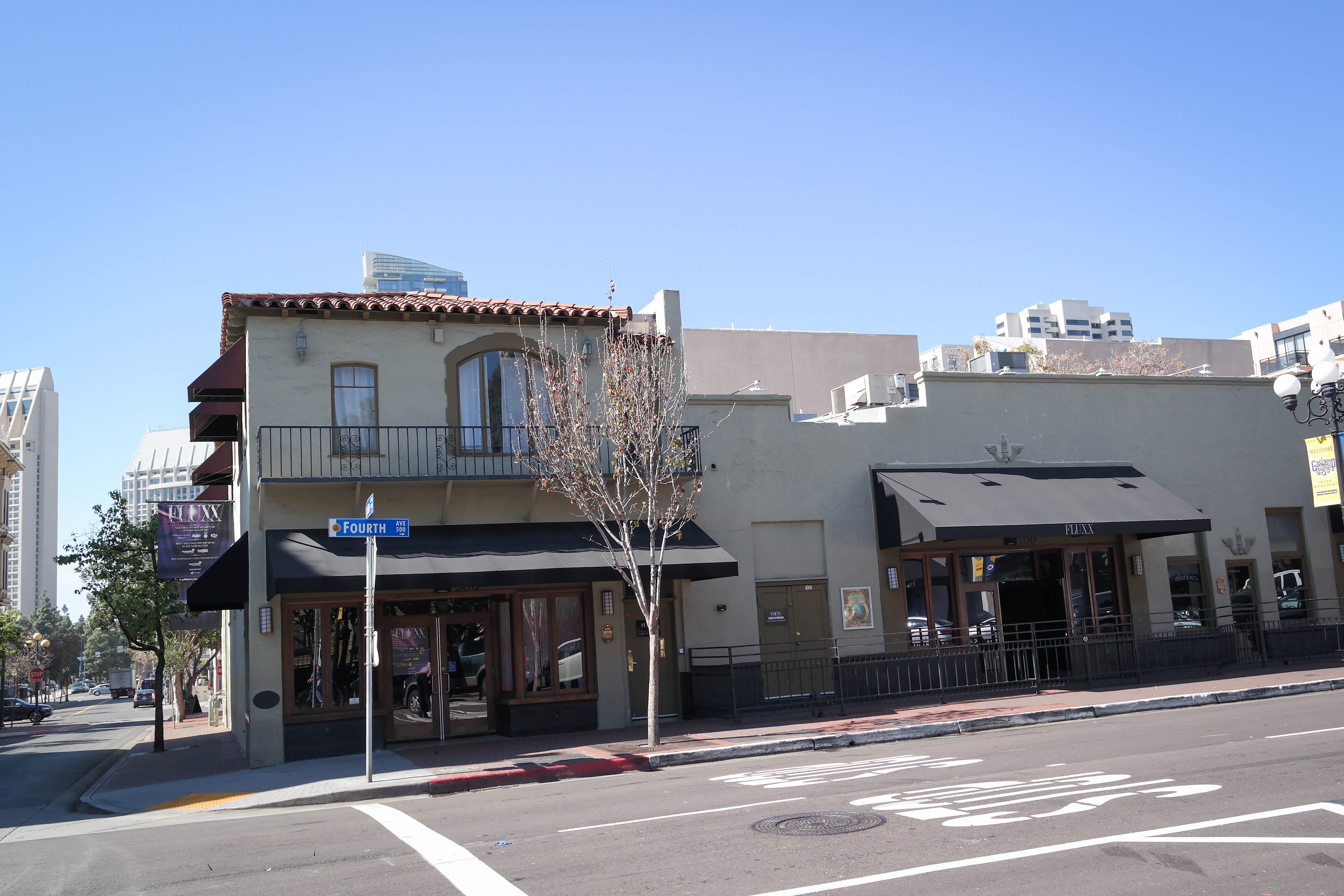
- The building's exterior in 2014
- Interactive map of the Quin Building area

General information
- Type: Historic structure
- Location: 500 4th Avenue, San Diego, United States
- Coordinates: 32°42′38″N 117°9′40.5″W
- Opened: 1930

The Quin Building is an historic structure located at 500 4th Avenue in San Diego's Gaslamp Quarter, in the U.S. state of California. It was built in 1930.

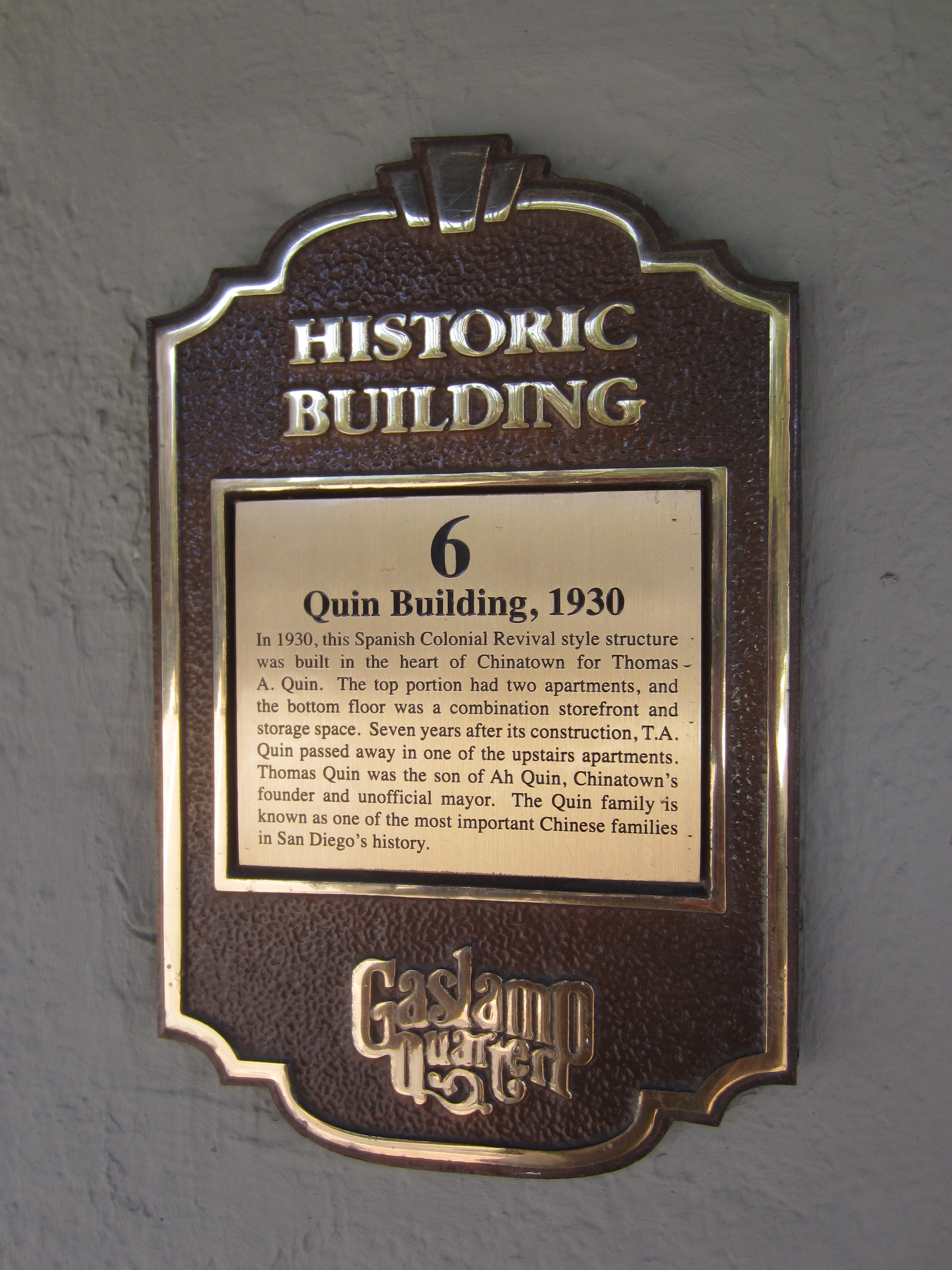
Plaque for the building, 2016

== See also ==
- List of Gaslamp Quarter historic buildings
