= Loring Building =

Historic building in San Diego, California, U.S.

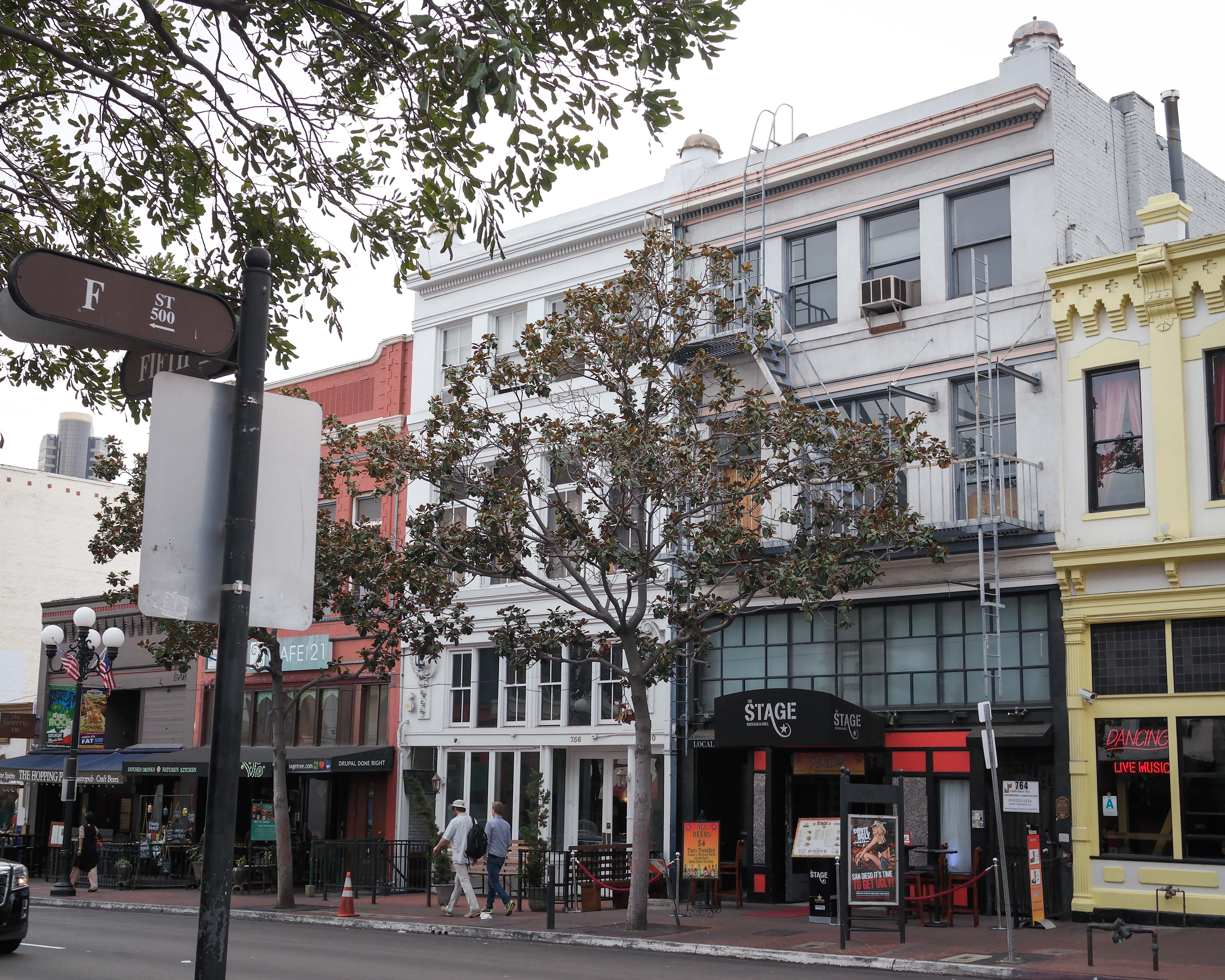
- The building's exterior in 2014
- Interactive map of the Loring Building area

General information
- Location: 764 5th Avenue, San Diego, United States
- Coordinates: 32.713416°N 117.160277°W
- Opened: 1873

The Loring Building is a Modern Renaissance historic structure made of brick and steel. It located at 764 5th Avenue in San Diego's Gaslamp Quarter, in the U.S. state of California. It was built in 1873.

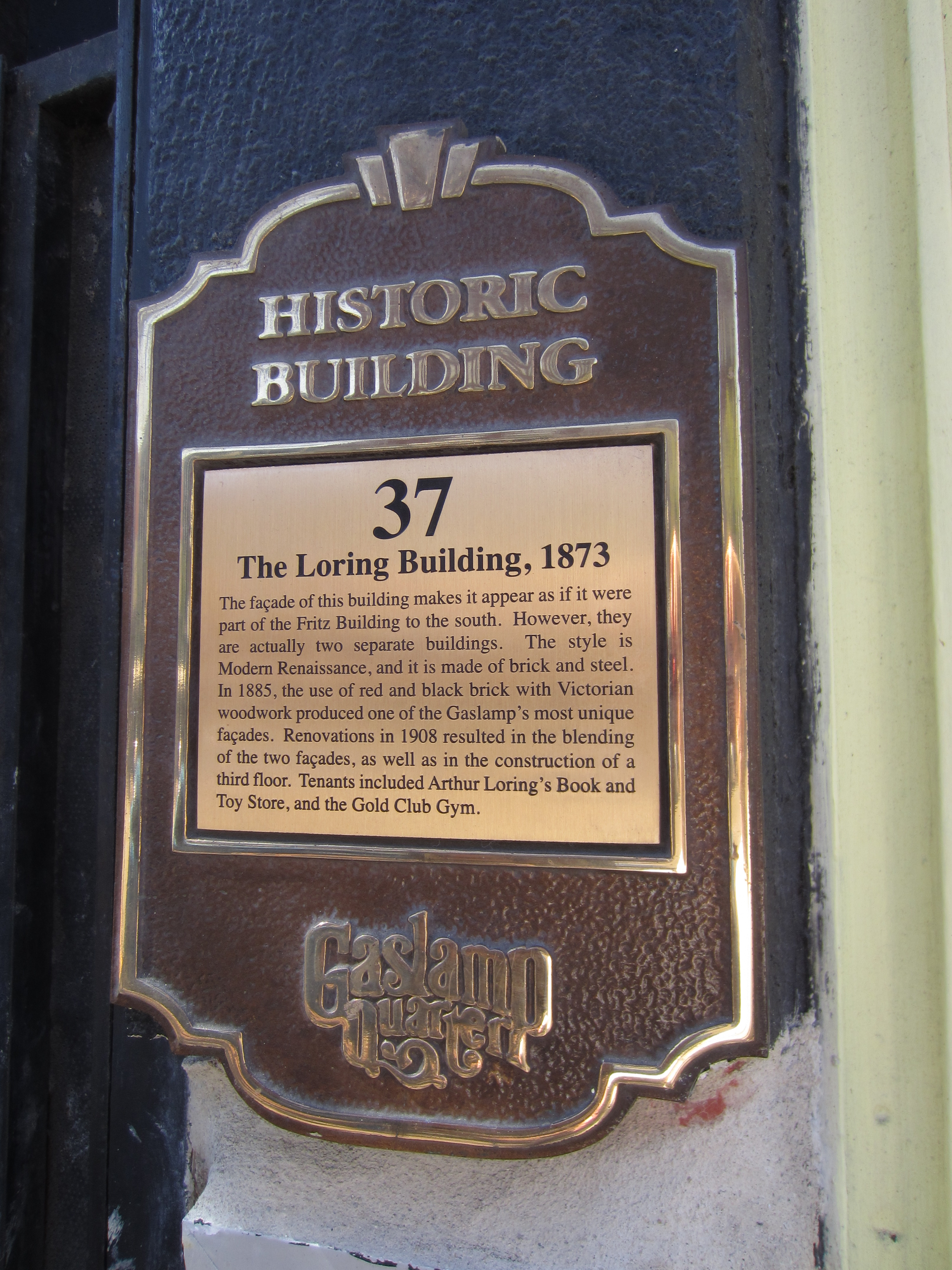
Plaque for the building, 2016

== See also ==
- List of Gaslamp Quarter historic buildings
