= Cotheret Building =

Historic building in San Diego, California, U.S.

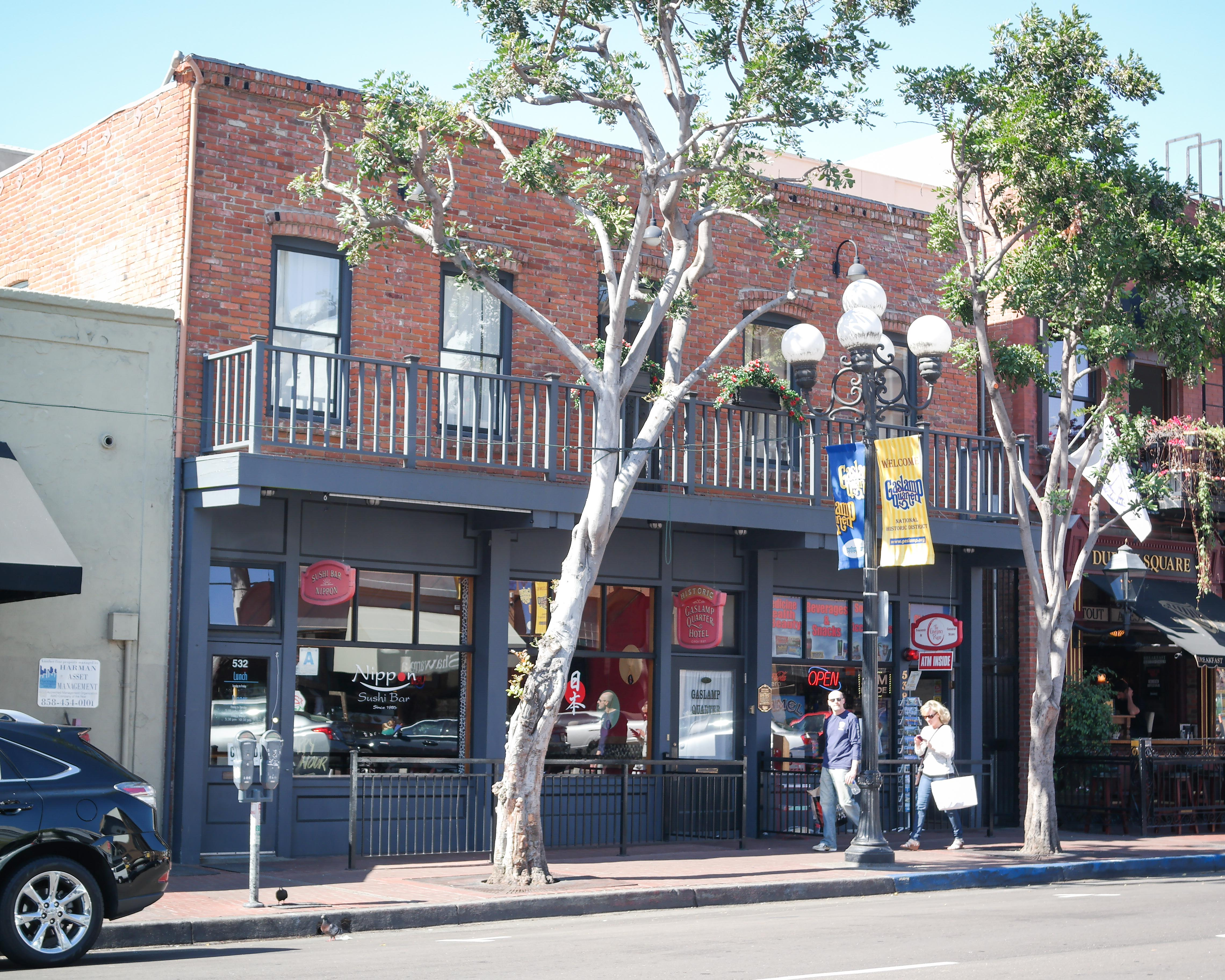
- The building's exterior in 2014
- Interactive map of the Cotheret Building area

General information
- Location: 536 4th Avenue, San Diego, California, United States
- Coordinates: 32.71089°N 117.16123°W

The Cotheret Building is an historic structure located at 536 4th Avenue in the Gaslamp Quarter, San Diego, in the U.S. state of California.

According to the Gaslamp Quarter historic building marker number 8 which is posted onto the structure's façade, the Cotheret Building was constructed in 1903 and is the only building currently standing in the Gaslamp Quarter with an original second story balcony. The upstairs of the building has operated as rented rooms under the names of the Cotheret, Ardmore, and Gaslamp Hotel. The Canary Cottage, run by San Diego's most notorious madam, Ida Bailey, was located behind this very structure. The narrow alley found to the right of the building provided Bailey's patrons access to the cottage and the Fan Tan Gambling House.

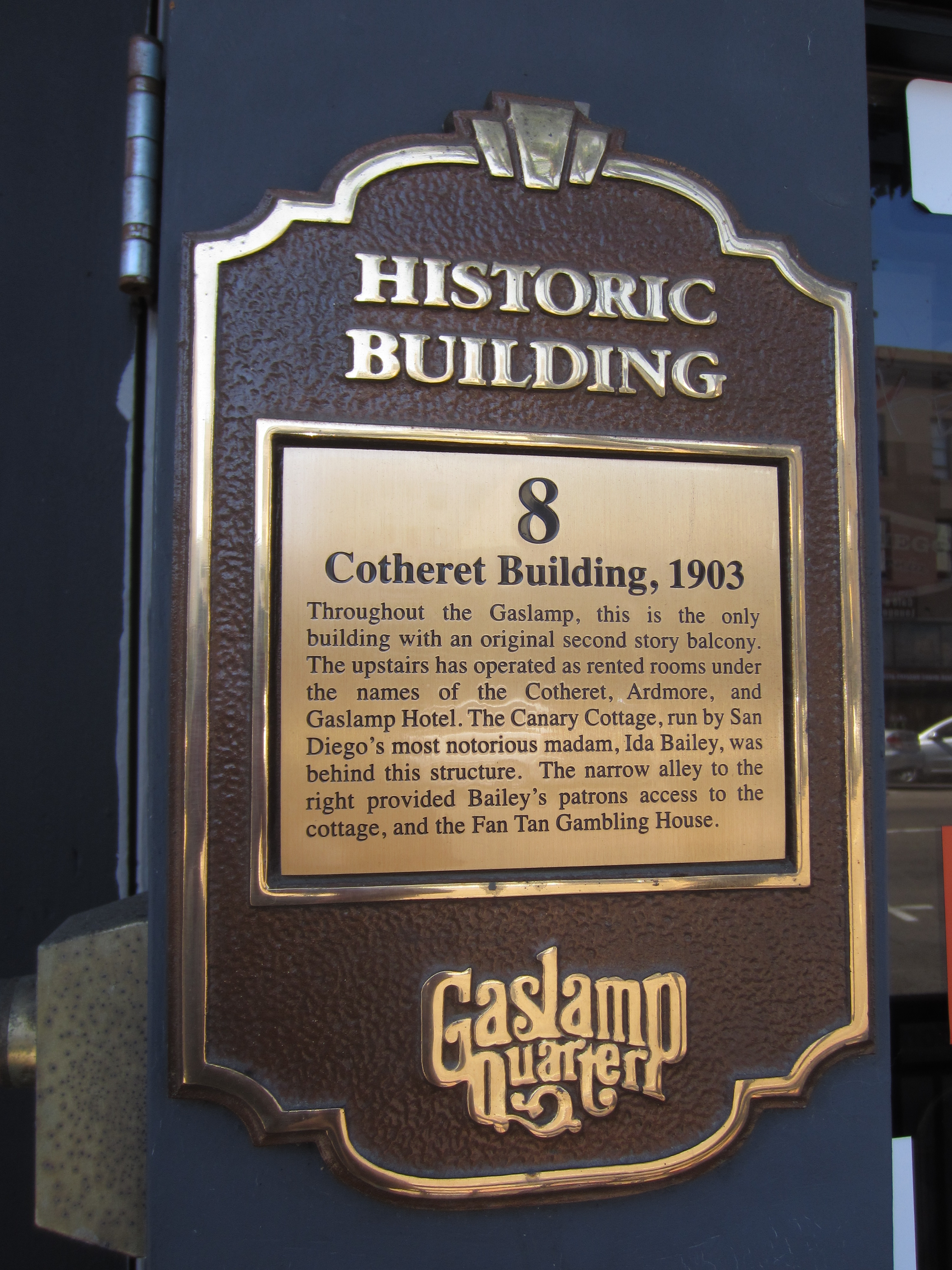
Plaque for the building, 2016

== See also ==
- List of Gaslamp Quarter historic buildings
