= Carriage Works =

Historic building in San Diego, California, U.S.

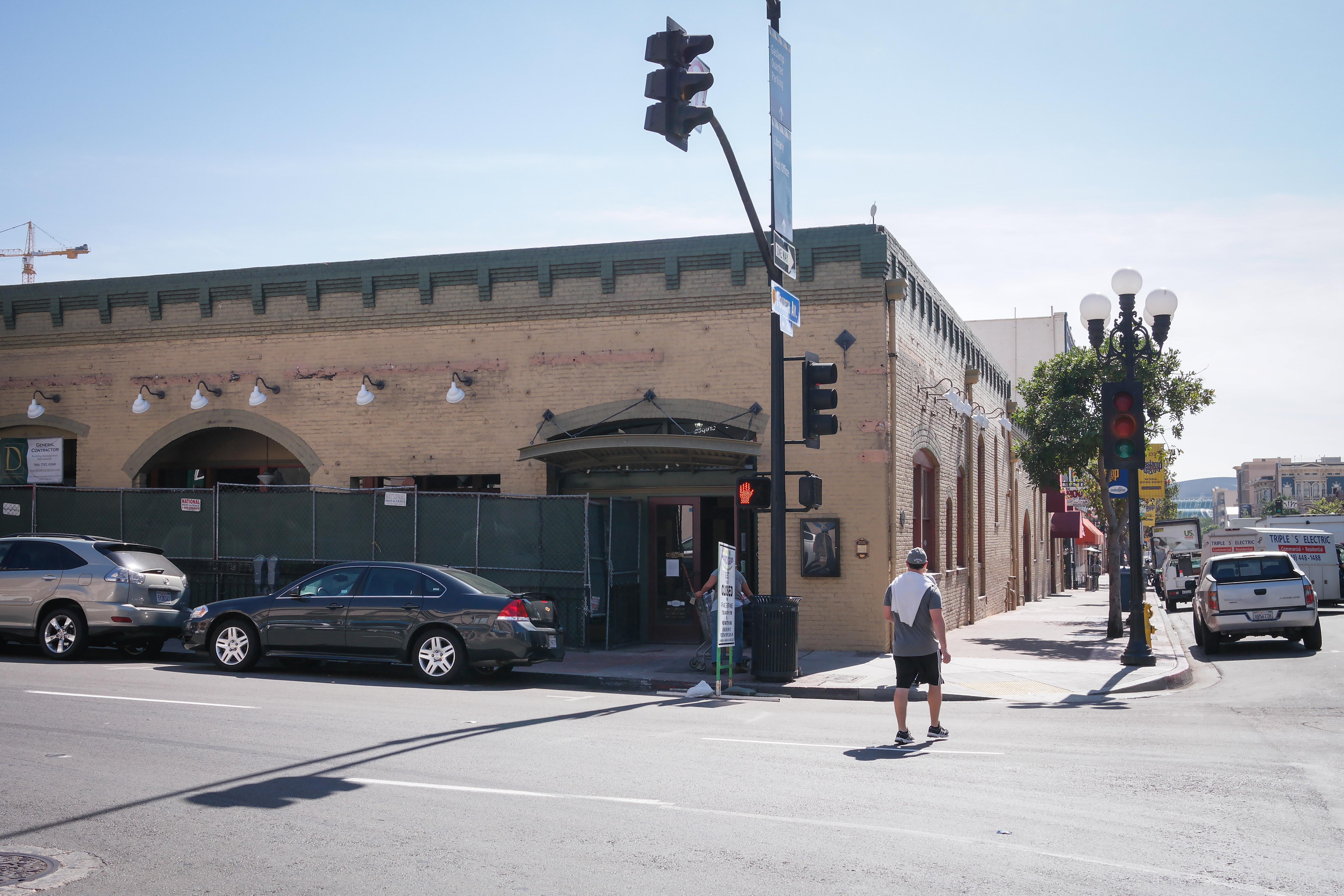
- The building's exterior in 2014
- Interactive map of the Carriage Works area

General information
- Location: 655 4th Avenue, San Diego, California, United States
- Coordinates: 32.712173°N 117.160924°W

The Carriage Works building is an historic structure located at 655 4th Avenue in the Gaslamp Quarter, San Diego, in the U.S. state of California. It was built in 1890.

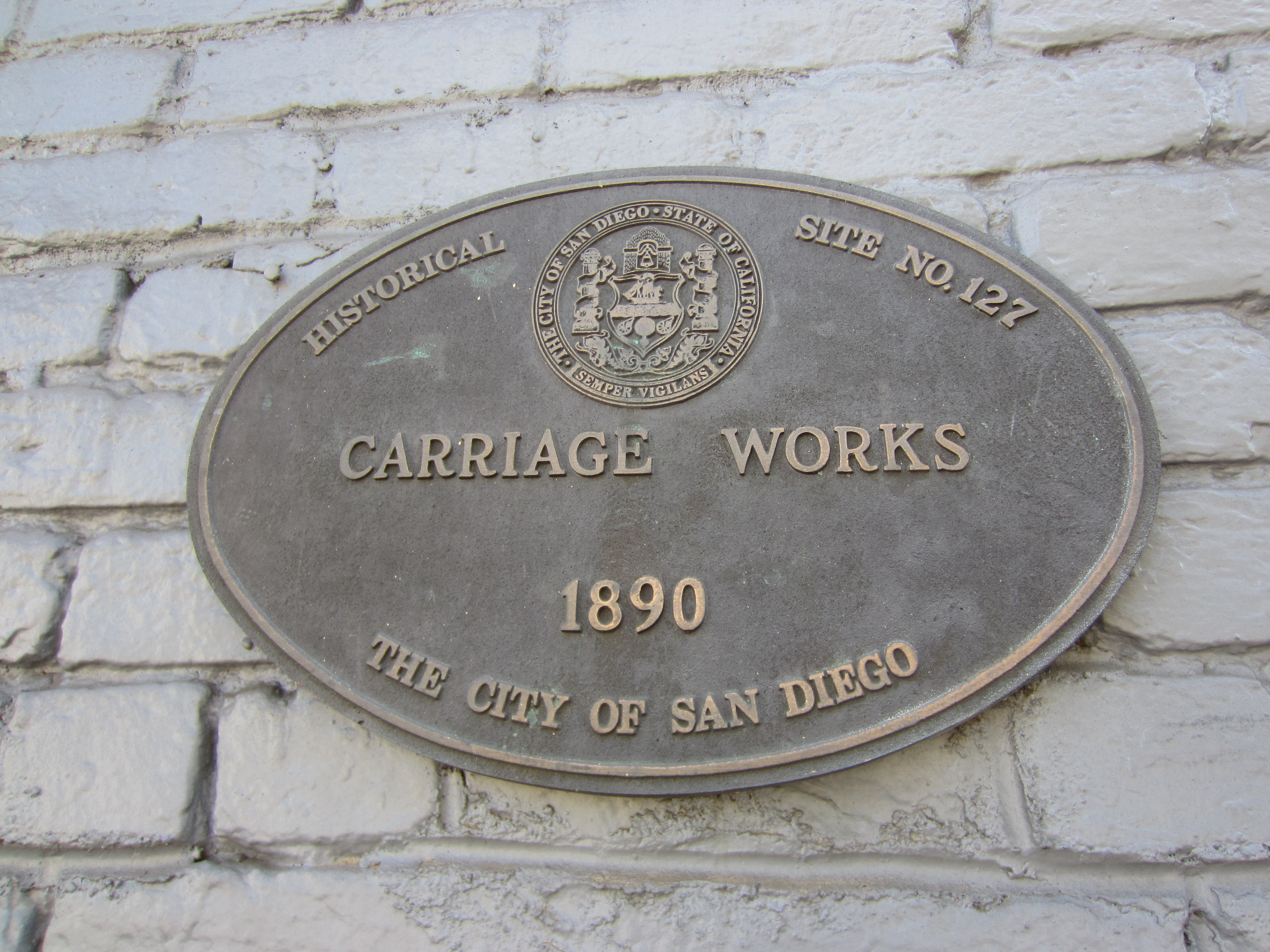
Plaque for the building, 2016

== See also ==
- List of Gaslamp Quarter historic buildings
