= Onyx Hotel =

Historic building in San Diego, California, U.S.

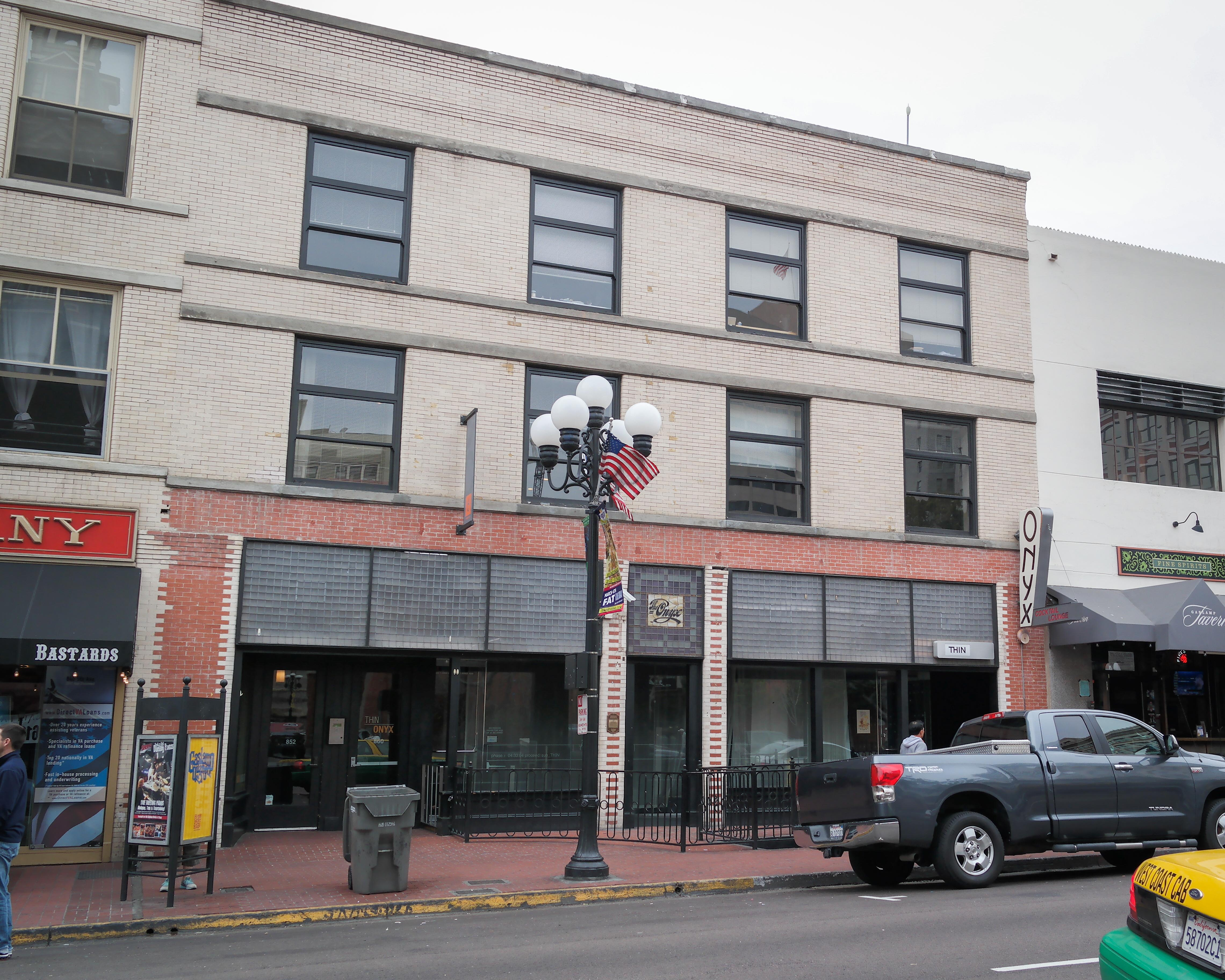
- The building's exterior in 2014
- Interactive map of the Onyx Hotel area

General information
- Type: Hotel
- Location: 856 5th Avenue, San Diego, United States
- Coordinates: 32.714353°N 117.160314°W
- Opened: 1910

The Onyx Hotel is a historic building located at 856 5th Avenue in San Diego's Gaslamp Quarter, in the U.S. state of California.

It was built in 1910 to house the Hotel Onyx, which advertised itself as having mahogany, maple, and walnut fixtures, hot and cold water, and a telephone in every room.

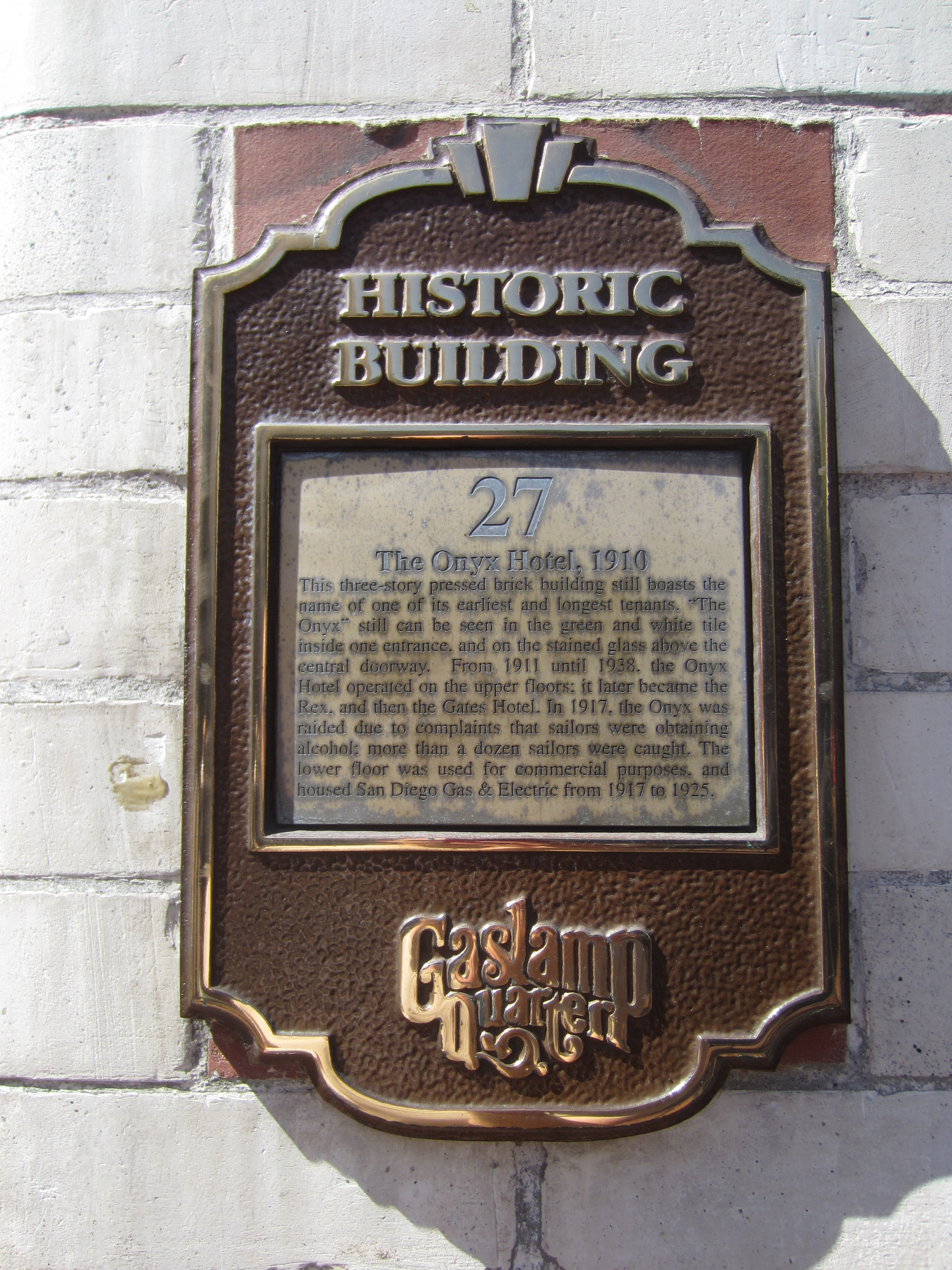
Plaque for the building, 2016

== See also ==
- List of Gaslamp Quarter historic buildings
