= Ingle Building =

Historic building in San Diego, California, U.S.

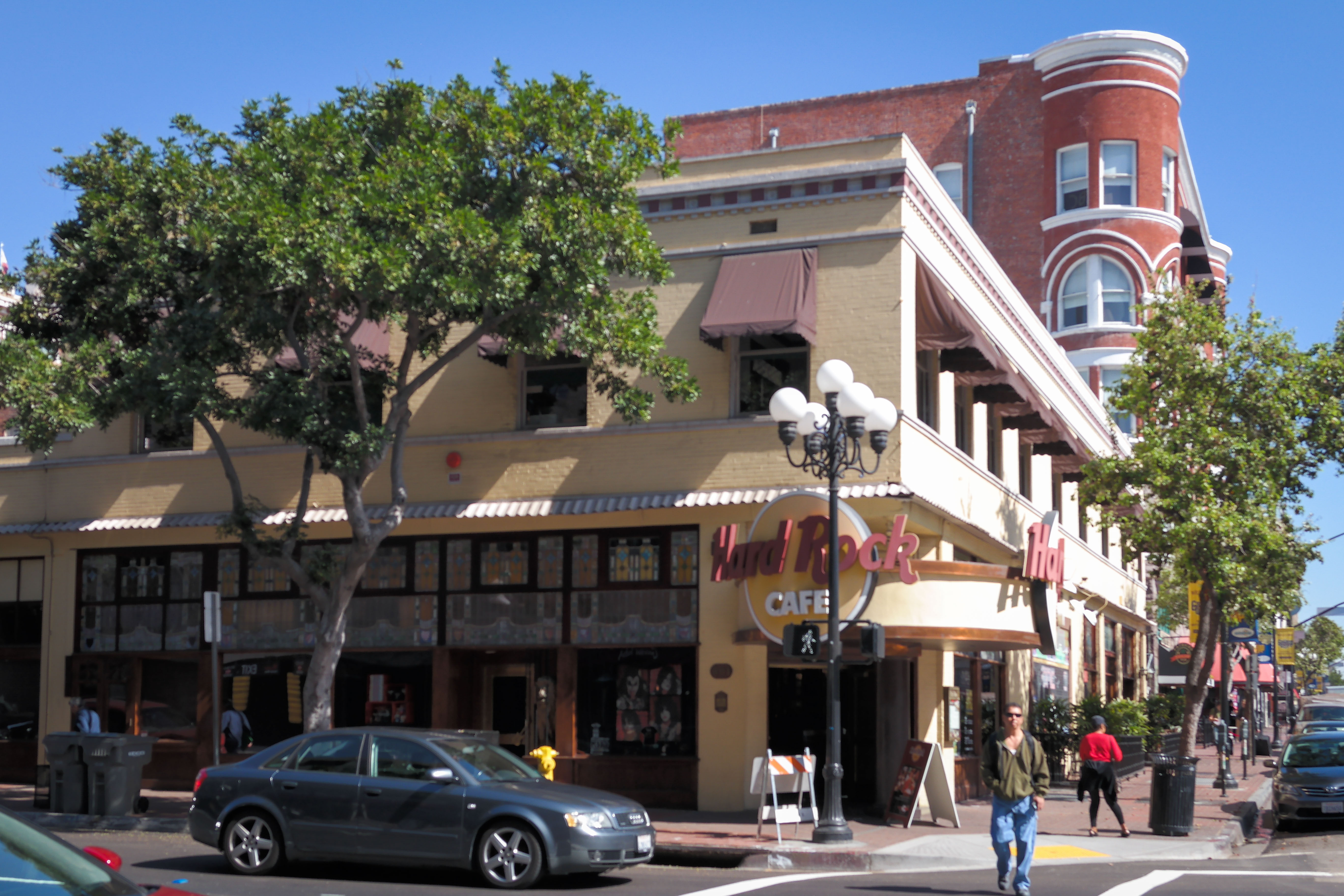
- The building's exterior in 2014
- Interactive map of the Ingle Building area

General information
- Location: 801 4th Avenue, San Diego, United States
- Coordinates: 32°42′50″N 117°09′39″W
- Opened: 1906

The Ingle Building is an historic structure located at 801 4th Avenue in the Gaslamp Quarter, San Diego, in the U.S. state of California. It was built in 1906 and housed the Golden Lion Tavern. Currently, the building is home to The World Famous Madhouse Comedy Club.

== See also ==
- List of Gaslamp Quarter historic buildings
