= Manila Cafe =

Historic building in San Diego, California, U.S.

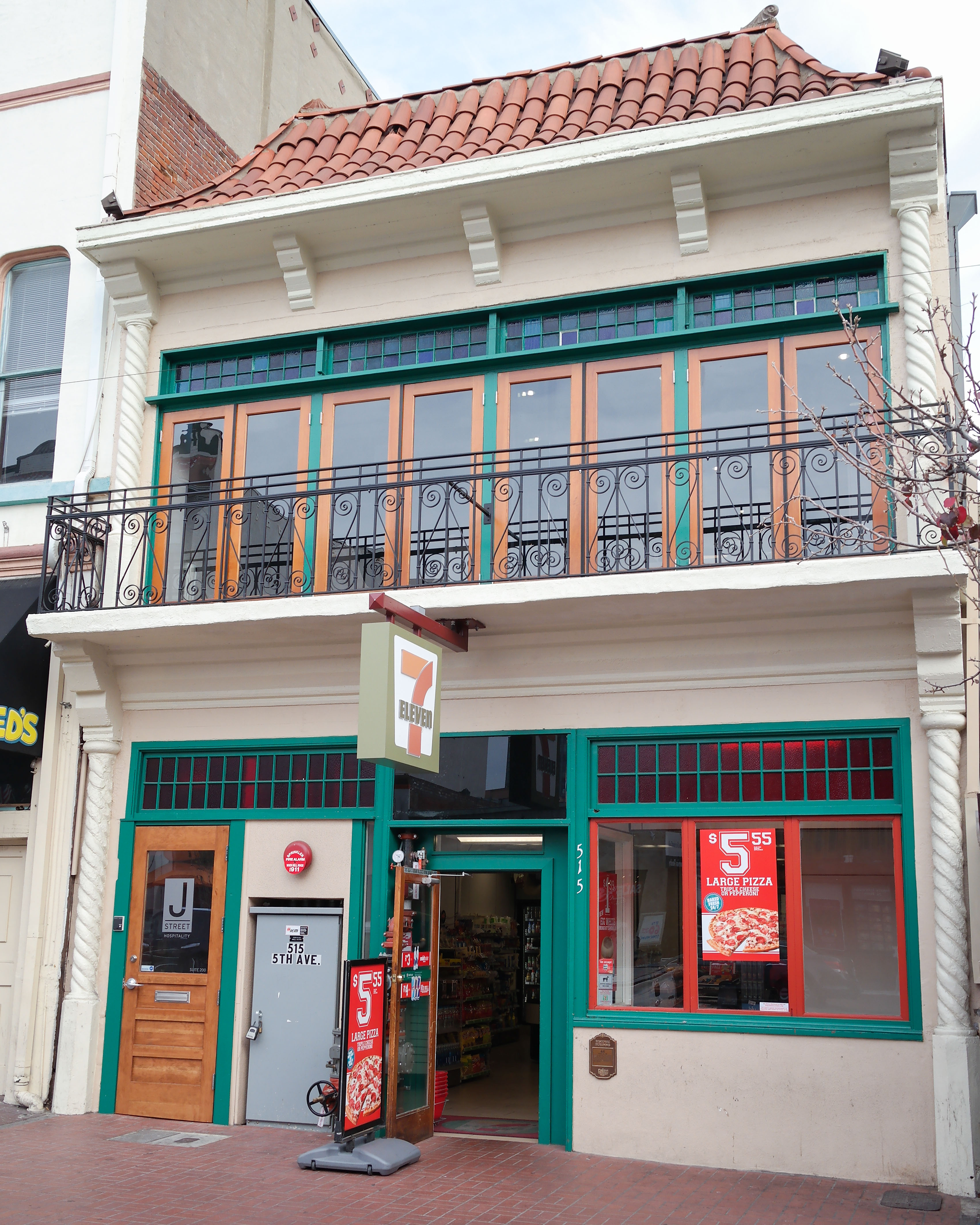
- Interactive map of the Manila Cafe area

General information
- Location: 515 5th Avenue, San Diego, California, U.S.
- Coordinates: 32.710710°N 117.159878°W

The Manila Cafe is an historic structure located at 515 5th Avenue in San Diego's Gaslamp Quarter, in the U.S. state of California. It was built in 1930, and has housed several restaurants since then, including but not limited to, the Mandarin Cafe (1931 to 1933), Owl Hotel, and Kid Jerome Billiard Hall (1940 to 1943). In 2014, a new tenant took over the building and made modifications to the exterior. However, the upper story and its distinctive roof remain intact. Several businesses currently occupy the space, including a 7-Eleven, Fident Capital, and Gbod Hospitality Group.

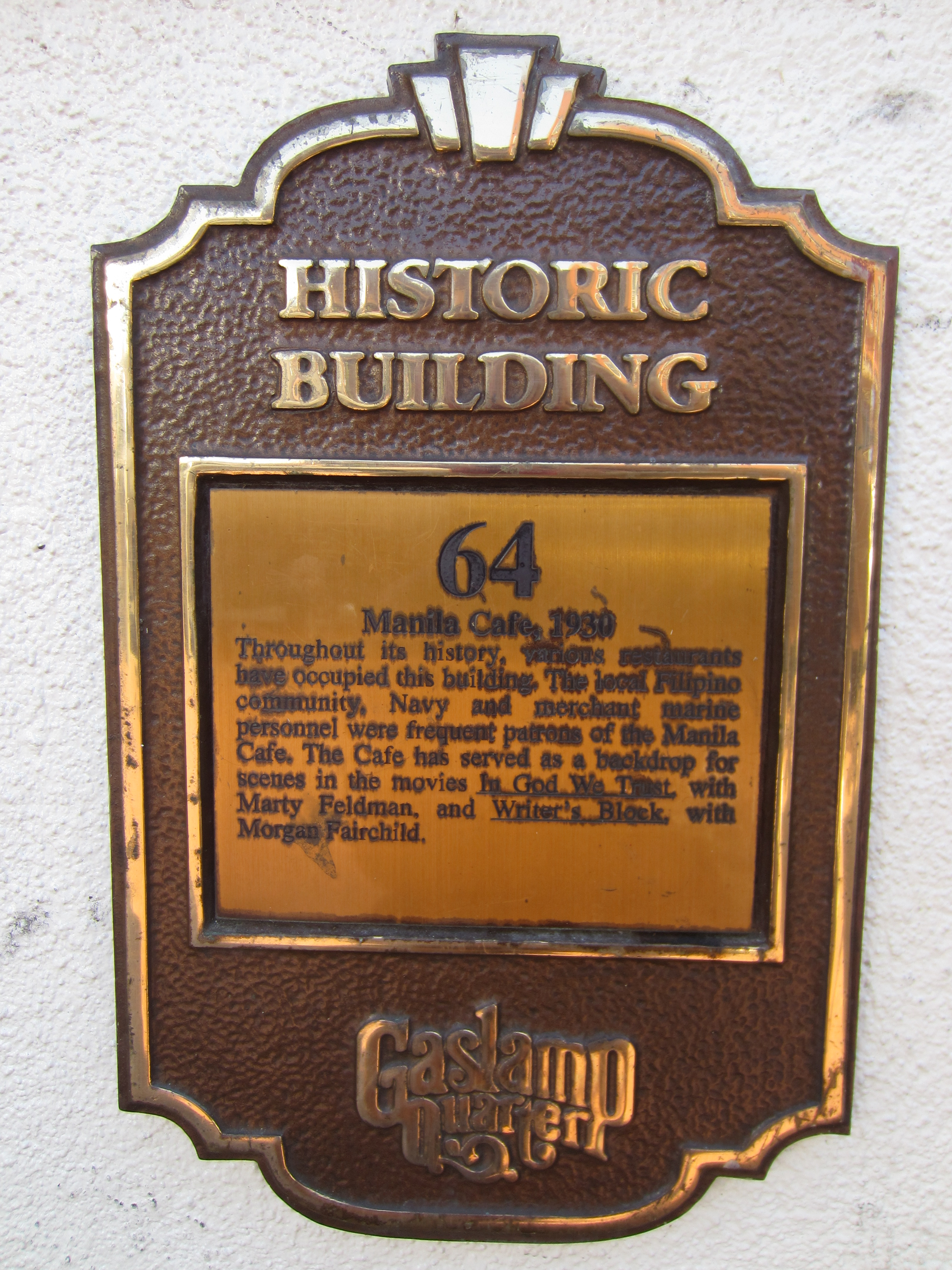
Plaque for the building, 2016

== See also ==
- List of Gaslamp Quarter historic buildings
