= Pacifica Hotel =

Historic building in San Diego, California, U.S.

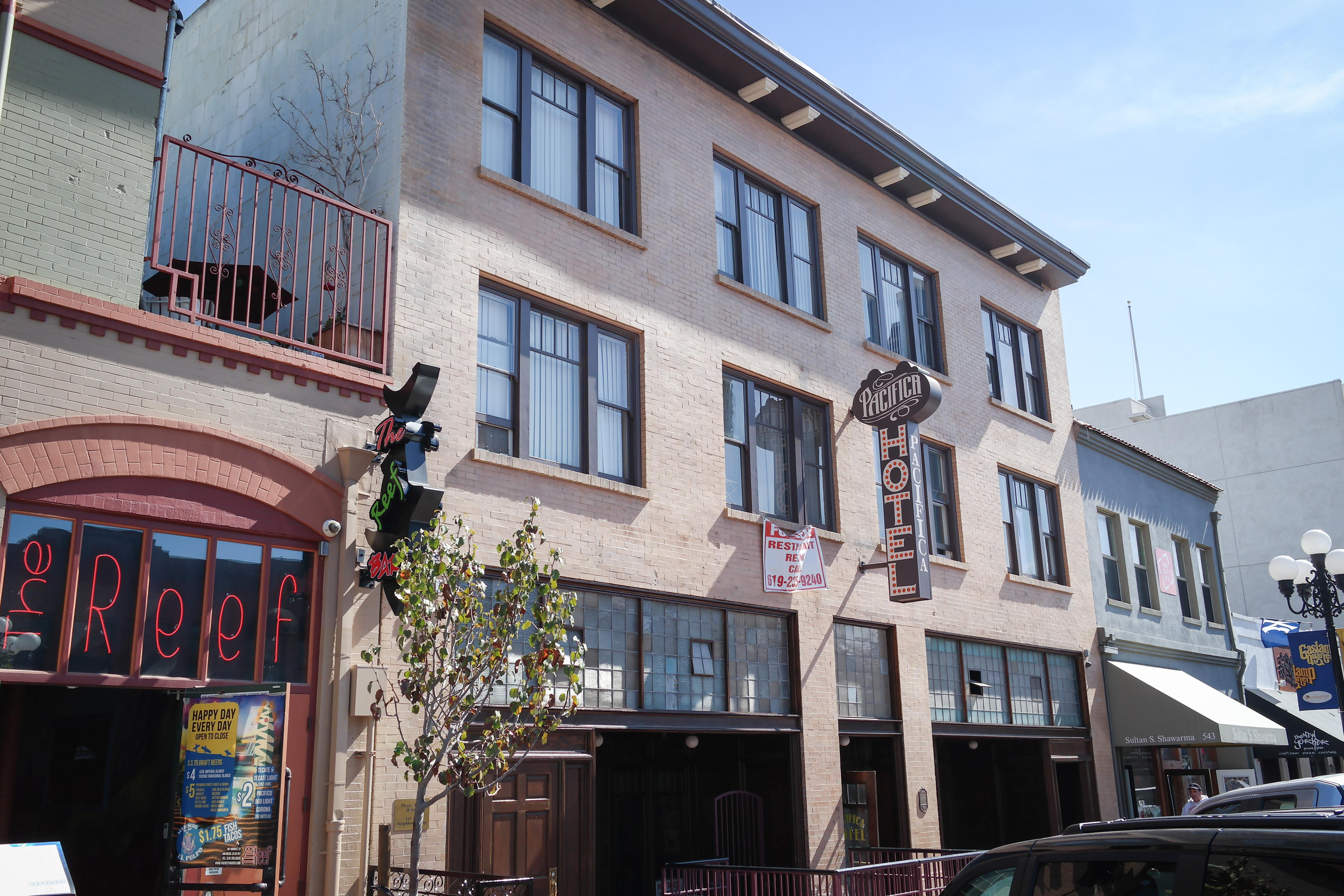
- The building's exterior in 2014
- Interactive map of the Pacifica Hotel area

General information
- Type: Historic structure
- Location: 547 4th Avenue, San Diego, United States
- Coordinates: 32.71108°N 117.16079°W
- Opened: 1910

The Pacifica Hotel building is an historic structure located at 547 4th Avenue in the Gaslamp Quarter, San Diego, in the U.S. state of California. It was built in 1910.

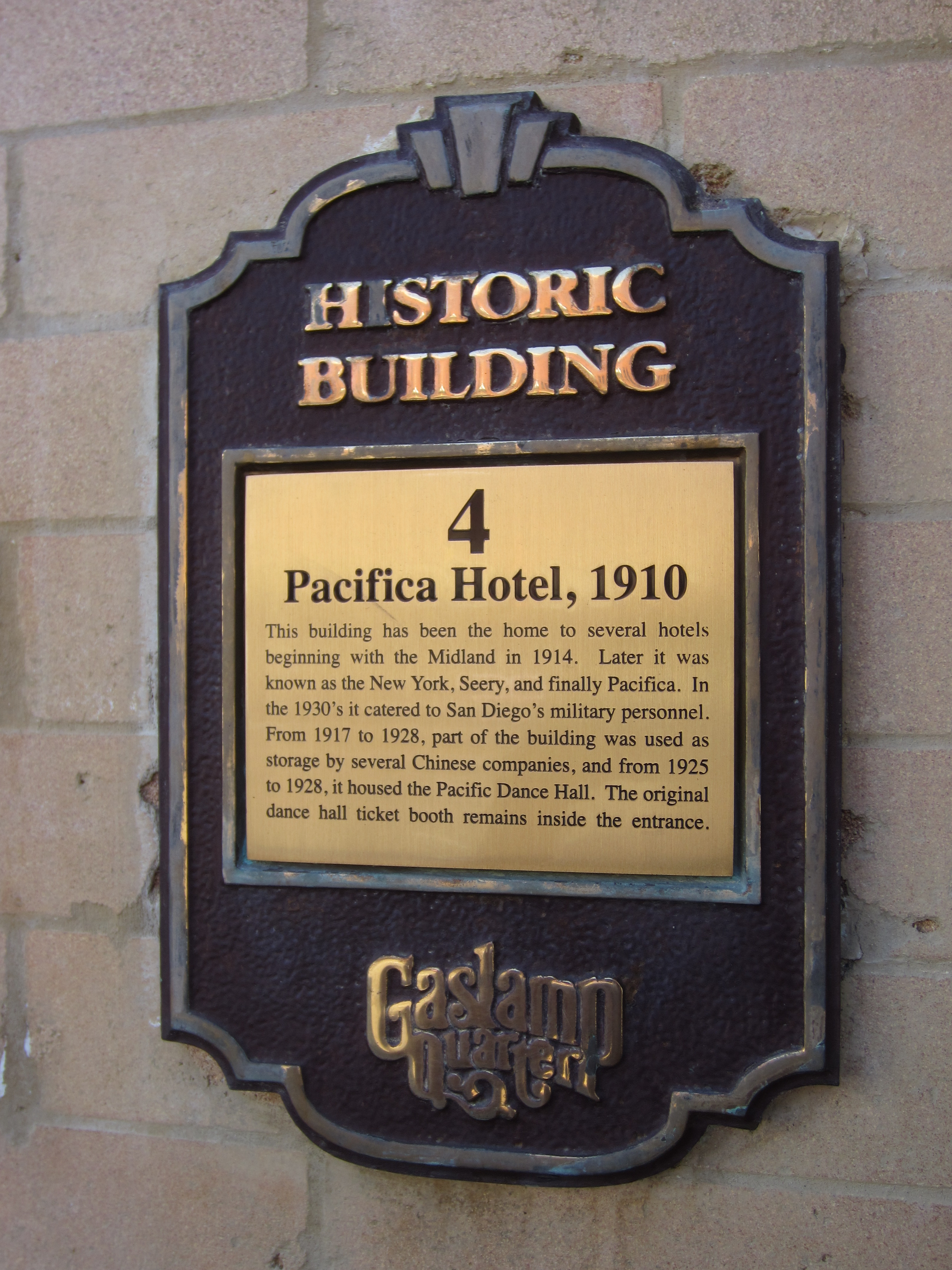
Plaque for the building, 2016

== See also ==
- List of Gaslamp Quarter historic buildings
