= Higgins–Begole Building =

Historic building in San Diego, California, U.S.

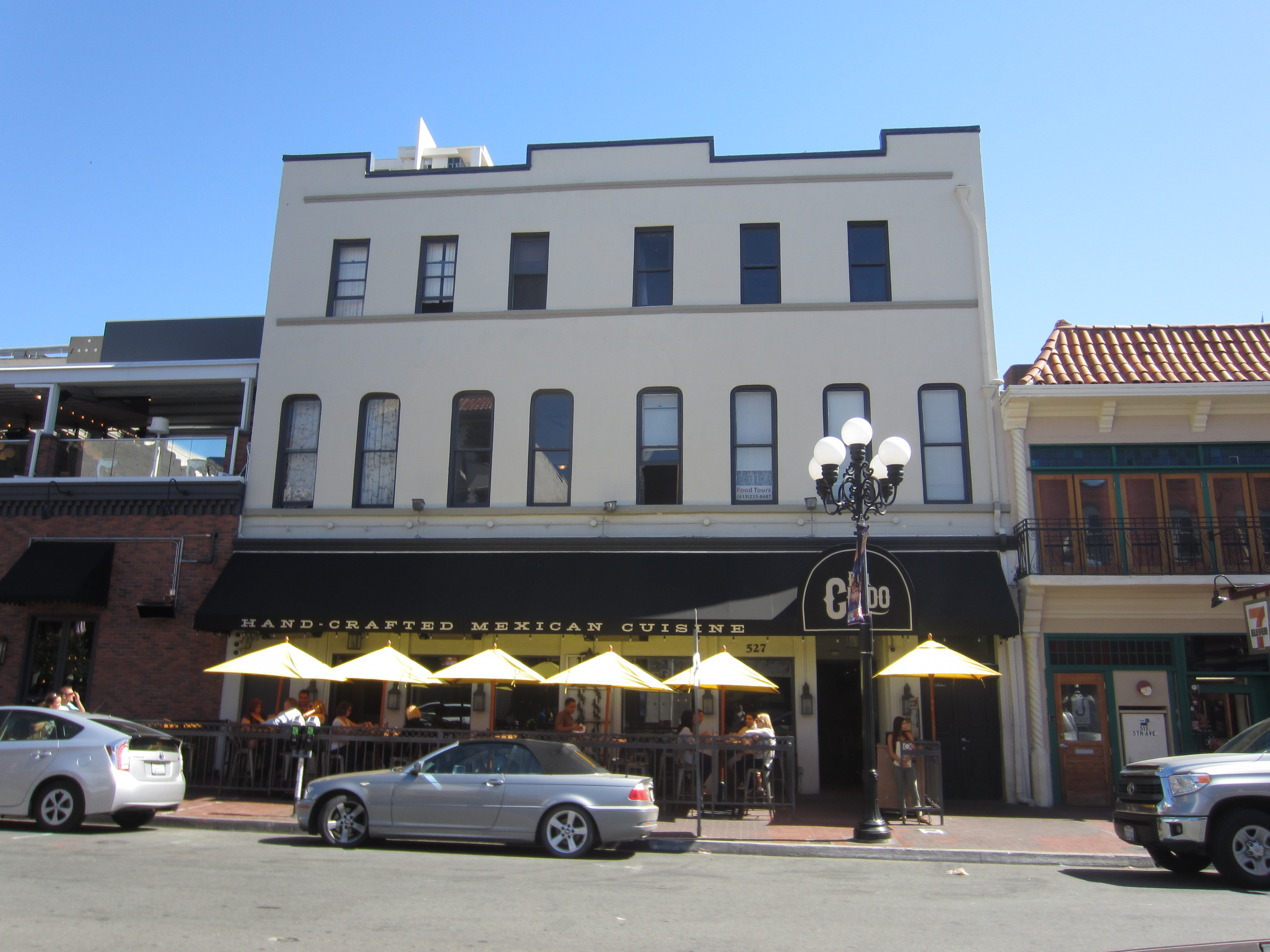
- The building's front exterior, 2016
- Interactive map of the Higgins–Begole Building area

General information
- Location: 527 5th Avenue, San Diego, United States
- Coordinates: 32.71078755257923°N 117.15993922017998°W
- Completed: 1873

The Higgins–Begole Building, or simply Higgins Building, is an historic structure located at 527 5th Avenue in the Gaslamp Quarter, San Diego, in the U.S. state of California. It was built in 1873.

== See also ==
- List of Gaslamp Quarter historic buildings
