= Simmons Hotel =

Historic building in San Diego, California, U.S.

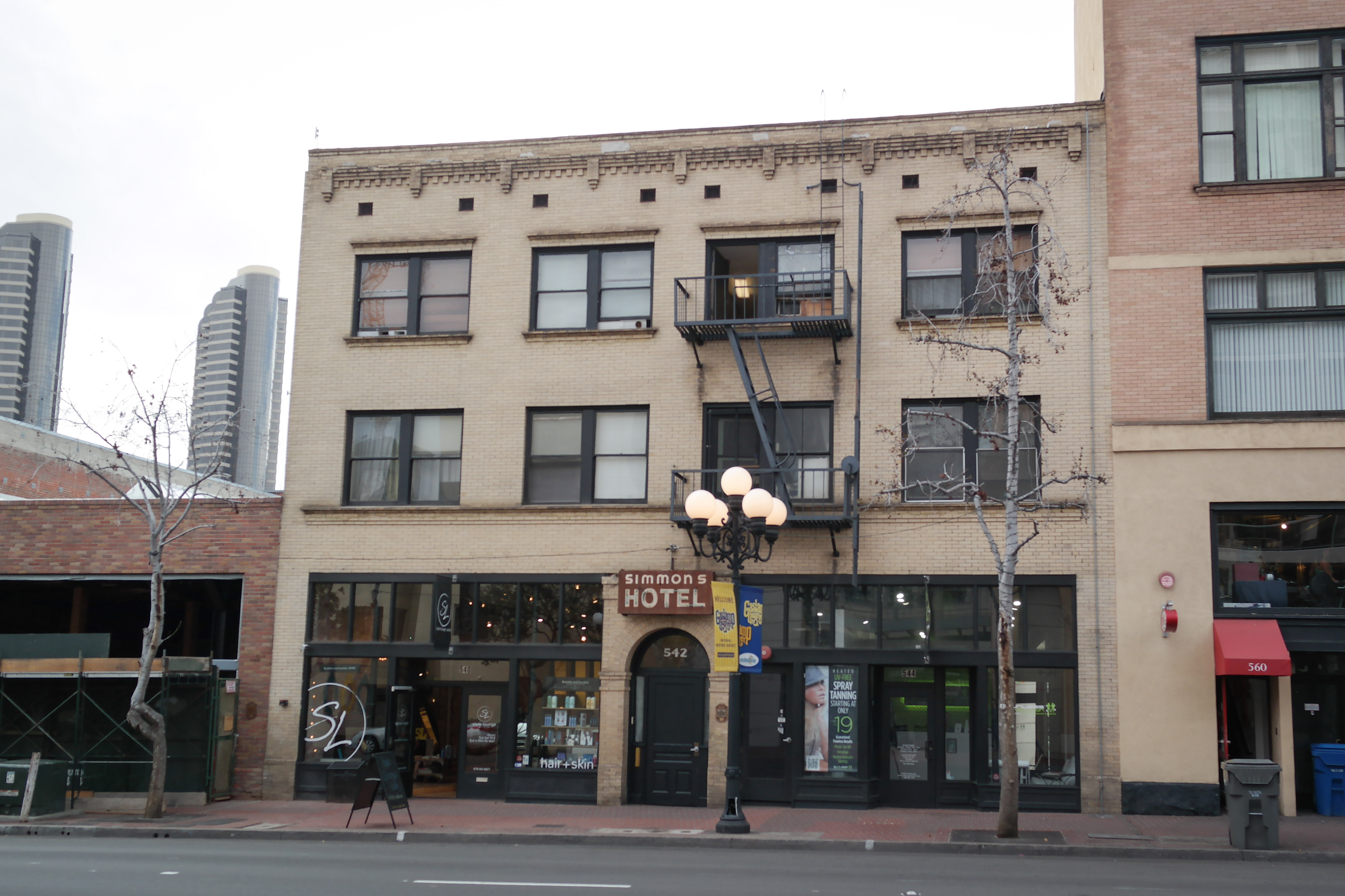
- The building's exterior in 2014
- Interactive map of the Simmons Hotel area

General information
- Type: Hotel
- Location: 542 6th Avenue, San Diego, United States
- Coordinates: 32.71102°N 117.15945°W
- Opened: 1906

The Simmons Hotel is an historic structure located at 542 6th Avenue in San Diego's Gaslamp Quarter, in the U.S. state of California. It was built in 1906. In the past it was called the Burbank (1907), the Sixth Street Rooms (1908), the Prescott (1909-1918), the Hotel North in 1921 and the Simmons Hotel in 1965. The building is on the former site of the San Diego Granite Works.

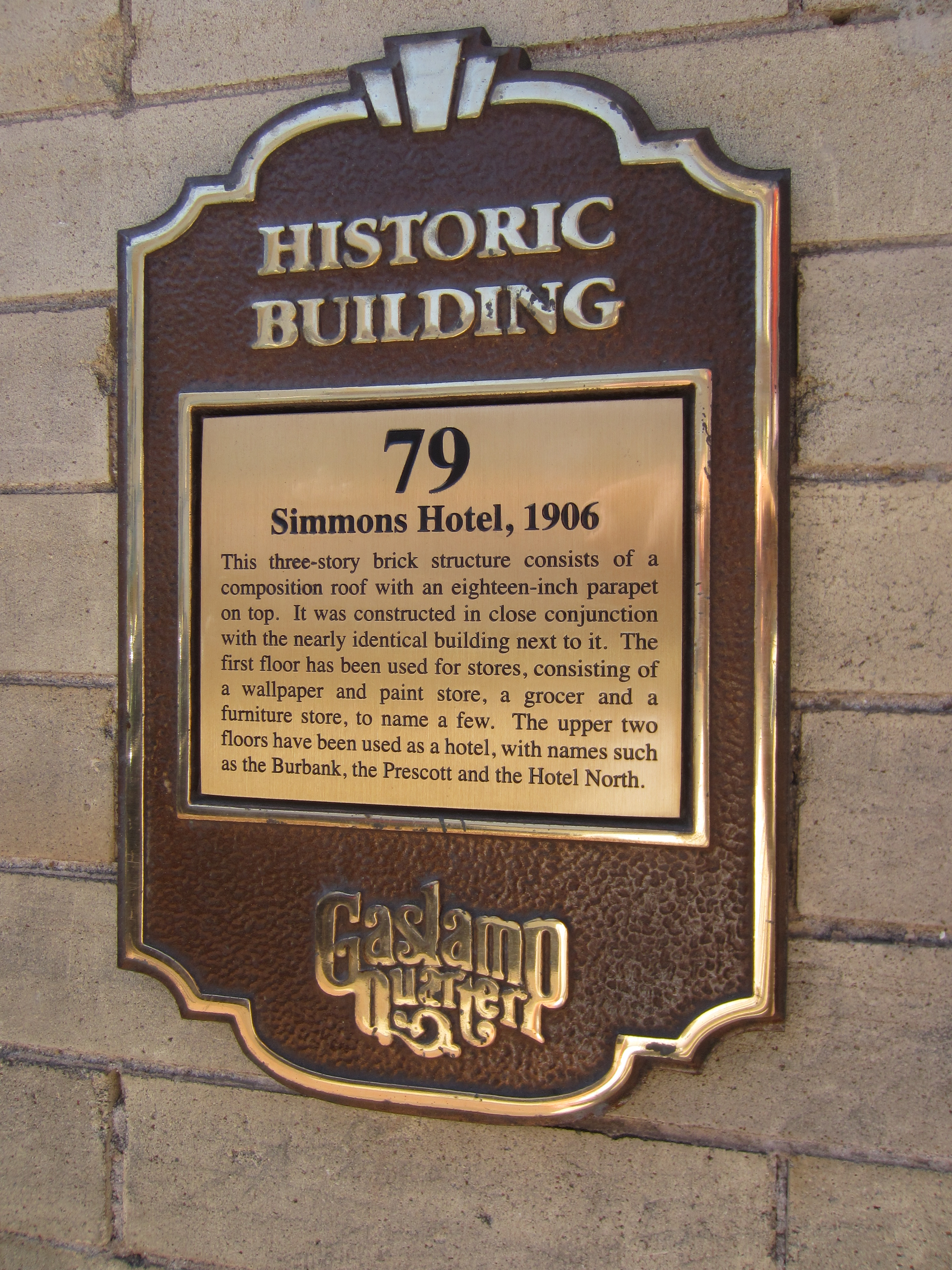
Plaque for the building, 2016

== See also ==
- List of Gaslamp Quarter historic buildings
