= Sterling Hardware Building =

Historic building in San Diego, California, U.S.

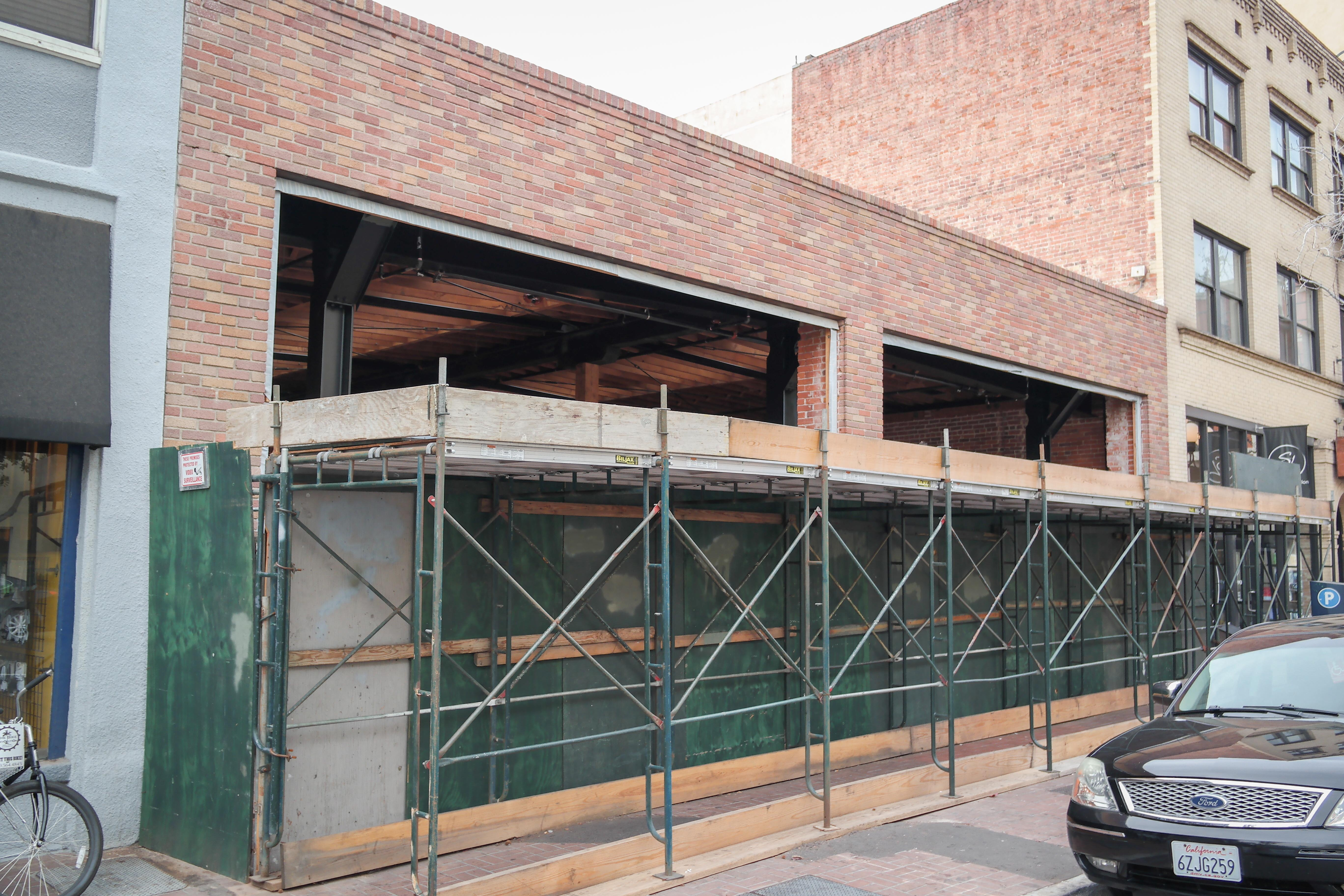
- The building's exterior in 2014

General information
- Location: 530 6th Avenue, San Diego, California, United States
- Coordinates: 32°42′39.2″N 117°9′34.2″W

The Sterling Hardware Building is an historic structure located at 530 6th Avenue in San Diego's Gaslamp Quarter, in the U.S. state of California. It was built in 1887.

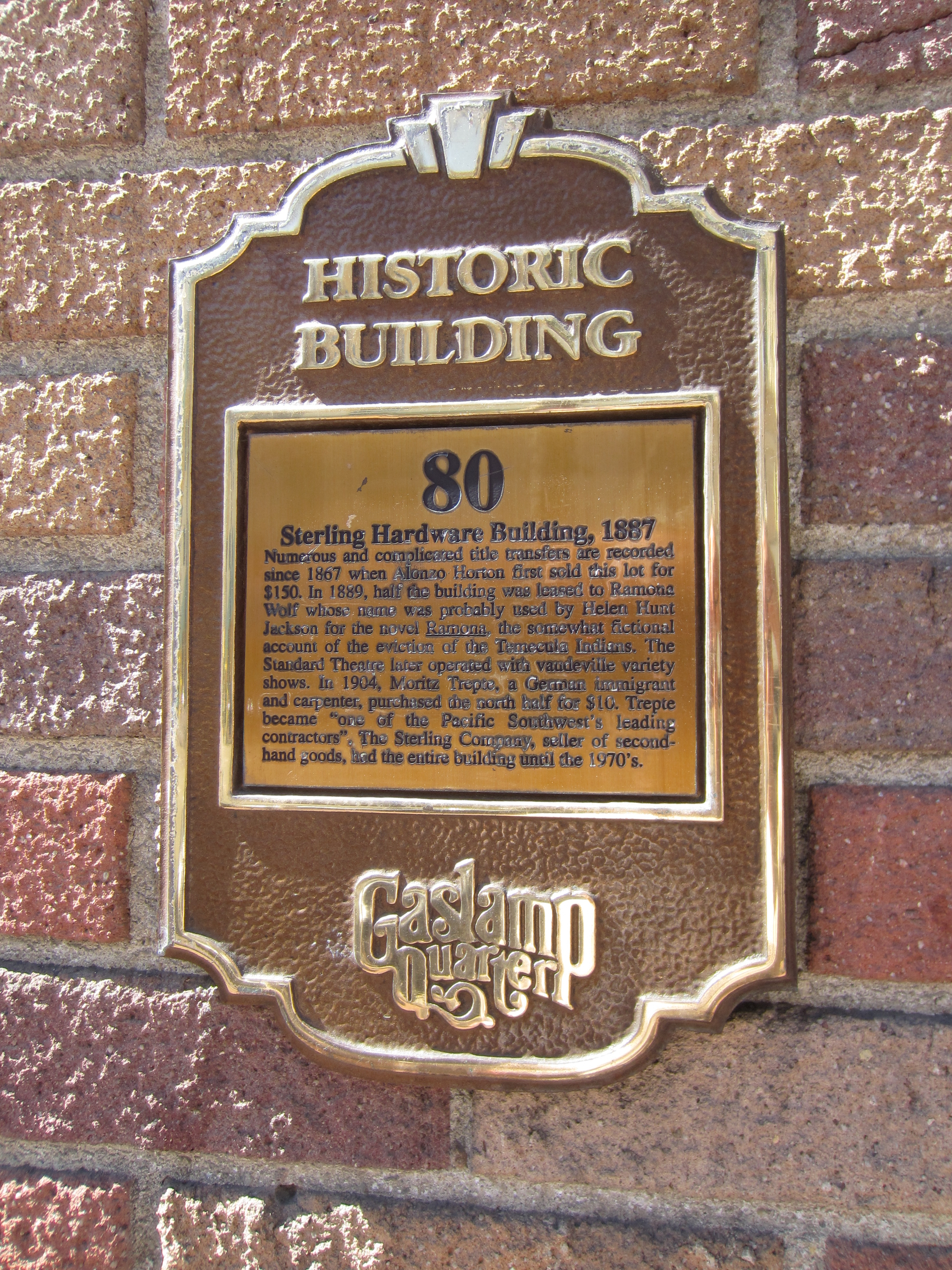
Plaque for the building, 2016

== See also ==
- List of Gaslamp Quarter historic buildings
