= Pat's Little Theater =

Historic building in San Diego, California, U.S.

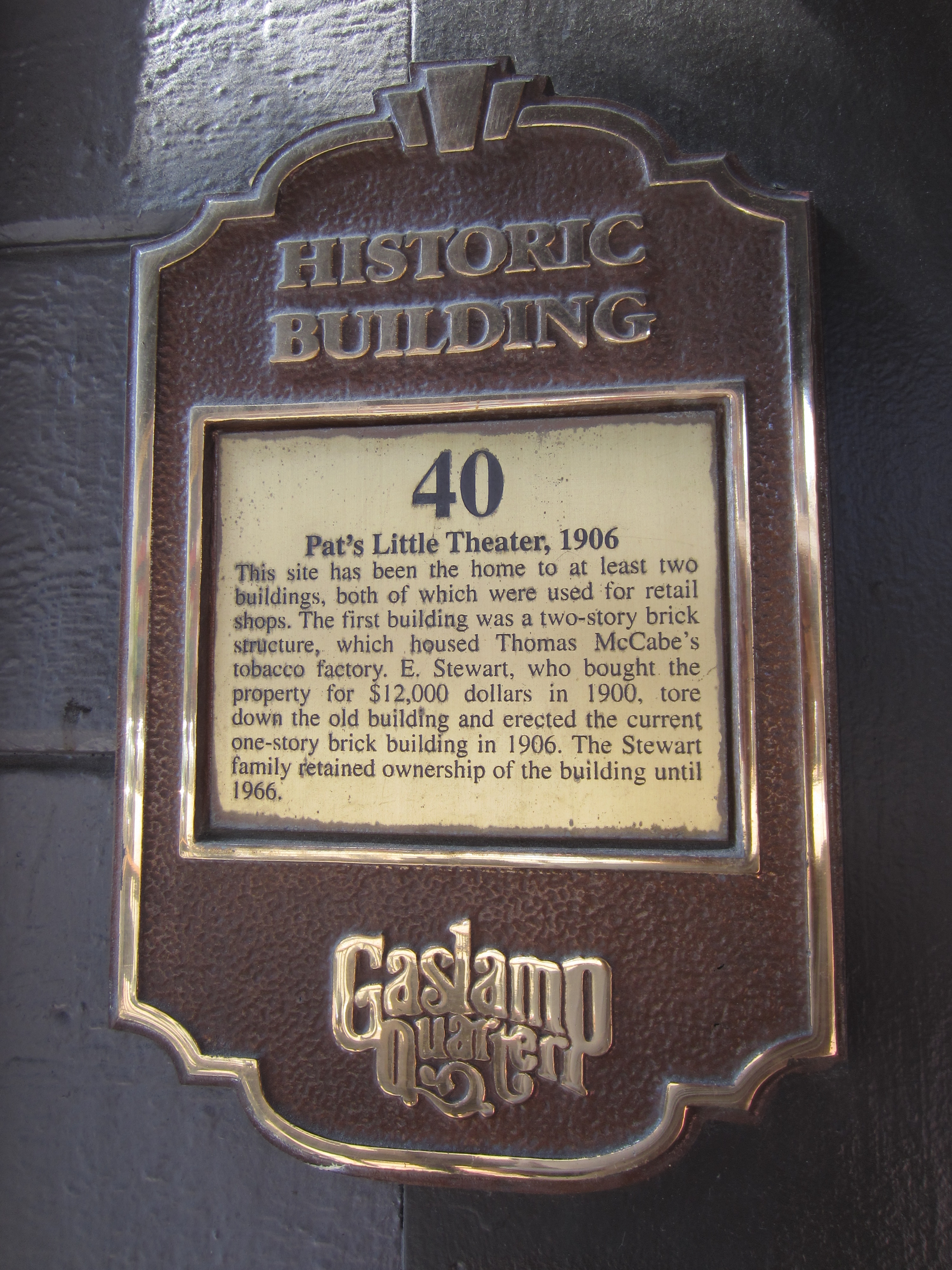
- Plaque for the building, 2016
- Interactive map of Pat's Little Theater
- Address: 748 5th Avenue
- Location: San Diego
- Coordinates: 32°42′47.6″N 117°9′37.2″W
- Type: Theater

Construction
- Built: 1906

The Pat's Little Theater is an historic structure located at 748 5th Avenue in San Diego's Gaslamp Quarter, in the U.S. state of California. In 1906 the current building was erected.

== See also ==
- List of Gaslamp Quarter historic buildings
