= List of Gaslamp Quarter historic buildings =

List of historic buildings in the Gaslamp Quarter, San Diego, California, U.S.

This table includes buildings in the Gaslamp Quarter Historic District in San Diego, California. The order of entries in the table is taken from a brochure printed by the Gaslamp Quarter Historical Foundation titled Architectural Guide and Walking Tour Map. This order also corresponds to numbers listed at the top of historic building survey plaques on many Gaslamp Quarter buildings.

== Buildings ==
No.	Name	Year	Location	Image	Notes
1	William Heath Davis House	1850	410 Island Avenue; 32.710543°N 117.160695°W		The oldest surviving structure in New Town.
2	Chinese Laundry	1923	527 4th Avenue; 32.710889°N 117.160907°W		
3	Tai Sing Building	1923	539 4th Avenue; 32.710979°N 117.160907°W		
4	Pacifica Hotel	1910	547 4th Avenue; 32.71109°N 117.160899°W		
5	Lester Hotel	1905	417 Market Street; 32.711372°N 117.160811°W		
6	Quin Building	1930	500 4th Avenue; 32.710552°N 117.161157°W		
7	Quin Building Addition	1930	520 4th Avenue; 32.710758°N 117.16117°W		
8	Cotheret Building	1903	536 4th Avenue; 32.710904°N 117.16117°W		Also known as the Gaslamp Hotel
9	Royal Pie Bakery	1884	554 4th Avenue; 32.711035°N 117.161175°W		
10	Frey Block	1911	345 Market Street; 32.71136°N 117.161167°W		
11	Broker's Building	1889	404 Market Street; 32.711667°N 117.160892°W		Also known as the Klauber-Wangenheim Building
12	Carriage Works	1890	655 4th Avenue; 32.712173°N 117.160924°W		
13	Labor Temple Building	1907	743 4th Avenue; 32.713184°N 117.160918°W		Also known as Horton Parsons Hall
14	Paris Hotel	1910	409 F Street; 32.713509°N 117.160905°W		
15	Ingle Building	1906	801 4th Avenue; 32.71373°N 117.160921°W		Housed the Golden Lion Tavern
16	Exchange Club	1905	815 4th Avenue; 32.713938°N 117.160924°W		
17	Panama Cafe	1907	827 4th Avenue; 32.714066°N 117.160931°W		
18	Windsor Hotel	1887	843 4th Avenue; 32.714208°N 117.160931°W		
19	Lawyer's Block	1889	901 4th Avenue; 32.714804°N 117.160929°W		
20	Schmitt Building	1888	951 4th Avenue; 32.715366°N 117.160934°W		
21	Granger Building	1904	964 5th Avenue; 32.715562°N 117.160285°W		
22	First National Bank Building	1884	904 5th Avenue; 32.714854°N 117.160301°W		San Diego Historic Landmark
23	Woolworth Building	1922	953 5th Avenue; 32.715395°N 117.160027°W		
24	Dalton Building	1911	939 5th Avenue; 32.715247°N 117.160033°W		Also known as the Universal Boot Shop
25	Howard Building	1887	933 5th Avenue; 32.715174°N 117.160022°W		Also known as Flagg Brothers Building
26	Watts–Robinson Building	1913	903 5th Avenue; 32.714797°N 117.160025°W		
27	Onyx Hotel	1910	852 5th Avenue; 32.714353°N 117.160314°W		
28	San Diego Hardware Building	1910	840 5th Avenue; 32.71424°N 117.160285°W		
29	Ingersoll–Tutton Building	1894	832 5th Avenue; 32.714073°N 117.160293°W		
30	Mercantile Building	1894	822 5th Avenue; 32.713962°N 117.160285°W		
31	Keating Building	1890	432 F Street; 32.713762°N 117.160426°W		San Diego Historic Landmark
32	Louis Bank of Commerce	1888	835 5th Avenue; 32.71424°N 117.160039°W		San Diego Historic Landmark
33	Nesmith–Greely Building	1888	825 5th Avenue; 32.714087°N 117.160007°W		San Diego Historic Landmark
34	Hubbell Building	1887	813-823 5th Avenue; 32.713933°N 117.160029°W		San Diego Historic Landmark
35	Marston Building	1881	809 5th Avenue; 32.713807°N 117.160023°W		San Diego Historic Landmark
36	Spencer Ogden Building	1874	770 5th Avenue; 32.713484°N 117.160293°W		
37	Loring Building	1873	764 5th Avenue; 32.713416°N 117.160277°W		
38	Fritz Building	1909	760 5th Avenue; 32.713378°N 117.16028°W		
39	Dunham Building	1888	750 5th Avenue; 32.713272°N 117.16028°W		
40	Pat's Little Theater	1906	746 5th Avenue; 32.7132°N 117.160277°W		
41	Llewelyn Building	1887	722 5th Avenue; 32.712965°N 117.160285°W		San Diego Historic Landmark
42	Cole Block Building	1892	702 5th Avenue; 32.712714°N 117.160286°W		San Diego Historic Landmark
43	William Penn Hotel	1920	511 F Street; 32.713545°N 117.159889°W		Also known as the New Hotel Oxford.
44	Dream Theatre	1885	755 5th Avenue; 32.71334°N 117.160035°W		
45	Pierce-Field Building	1885	753 5th Avenue; 32.713353°N 117.160035°W		
46	Old City Hall	1874	664 5th Avenue; 32.712457°N 117.160282°W		Also known as the Commercial Bank Building
47	Bijou Theater	1875	658 5th Avenue; 32.712308°N 117.16028°W		Also known as the Old City Hall Addition
48	Backesto Building	1873	614 5th Avenue; 32.712107°N 117.160272°W		San Diego Historic Landmark
49	Bancroft Building	1886	665 5th Avenue; 32.712387°N 117.160001°W		
50	Casino Theatre	1912	643 5th Avenue; 32.712189°N 117.160003°W		
51	Yuma Building	1888	631 5th Avenue; 32.711943°N 117.159966°W		San Diego Historic Landmark
52	Combination Store	1880	621 5th Avenue; 32.711943°N 117.159912°W		
53	McGurck Block	1887	611 5th Avenue; 32.711749°N 117.159998°W		San Diego Historic Landmark
54	Young Building	1883	421 Market Street; 32.711374°N 117.160631°W		Also known as the Sun Cafe, a 1920s shooting gallery turned restaurant.
55	Timkin Building	1894	568 5th Avenue; 32.711376°N 117.160269°W		
56	Montijo Building	1895	560 5th Avenue; 32.711209°N 117.160255°W		
57	Marin Hotel	1888	552 5th Avenue; 32.711132°N 117.160253°W		San Diego Historic Landmark
58	Lowenstein Building	1887	544 5th Avenue; 32.71106°N 117.160255°W		Alternate spelling: Loewenstein
59	Lewis Brick Block, also known as the Stingaree Hotel	1887	538 5th Avenue; 32.710995°N 117.160253°W		
60	Lincoln Hotel	1913	536 5th Avenue; 32.710927°N 117.16025°W		
61	Yamada Building	1869	516 5th Avenue; 32.710728°N 117.160264°W		
62	Callan Hotel	1878	502 5th Avenue; 32.710568°N 117.160258°W		
63	Higgins–Begole Building	1887	527 5th Avenue; 32.710816°N 117.159985°W		
64	Manila Cafe	1930	515 5th Avenue; 32.71071°N 117.159878°W		
65	Nanking Building	1912	467 5th Avenue; 32.710259°N 117.159993°W		
66	Island Hotel	1877	449 5th Avenue; 32.710069°N 117.159985°W		
67	Grand Pacific Hotel	1887	366 5th Avenue; 32.709216°N 117.160245°W		
68	Pioneer Warehouse	1918	301 4th Avenue; 32.708483°N 117.160883°W		A 1925 adjoining addition to the warehouse is at 310 5th Avenue.
69	Brunswig Drug Company Building	1900	383 5th Avenue; 32.709196°N 117.159971°W		
70	Buel–Town Building	1898	278 5th Avenue; 32.708219°N 117.159979°W		
71	Samuel I. Fox Building	1929	531 Broadway; 32.715653°N 117.159378°W		
72	St. James Hotel	1912	844 6th Avenue; 32.714138°N 117.159373°W		
73	Sheldon Block	1888	822 6th Avenue; 32.713958°N 117.159365°W		
74	George Hill Building	1897	527 F Street; 32.713527°N 117.159534°W		
75	Snyder Building	1923	748 6th Avenue; 32.713317°N 117.159378°W		
76	I.O.O.F. Building	1882	526 Market Street; 32.711665°N 117.159526°W		San Diego Historic Landmark, NRHP listing: #78000751
77	Alan John Factory	1908	568 6th Avenue; 32.711268°N 117.159341°W		
78	Simmons Hotel	1906	540 6th Avenue; 32.711033°N 117.159352°W		
79	Sterling Hardware Building	1924	530 6th Avenue; 32.710895°N 117.159349°W		
80	New York Hotel	1887	520 6th Avenue; 32.710776°N 117.159338°W		
81	Produce Market Building	1918	454 6th Avenue; 32.710311°N 117.159343°W		
82	Manos Market	1896	444 6th Avenue; 32.709875°N 117.159335°W		A parking lot is all that remains.
83	Greenbaum Market Building	1915	528 J Street; 32.709487°N 117.159596°W		A parking lot is all that remains.
84	San Diego Lumber Co. Building	1926	170 6th Avenue; 32.707104°N 117.15933°W		
85	Chinese Mission	1927	400 3rd Avenue; 32.709537°N 117.162066°W		
86	Quong Building	1913	416 3rd Avenue; 32.709659°N 117.162063°W		
87	Chinese Consolidated Benevolent Association	1911	428 3rd Avenue; 32.709808°N 117.162069°W		San Diego Historic Landmark
88	Quin Residence	1888	429 3rd Avenue; 32.709808°N 117.161816°W		
89	Ying-On Merchants and Labor Benevolent Association	1925	500 3rd Avenue; 32.71057°N 117.162071°W		
90	Plants and Fireproofing Building	1928	540 3rd Avenue; 32.711031°N 117.162079°W		
91	Horton Grand Hotel and Kahle Saddlery	1886	311 Island Avenue; 32.710442°N 117.161213°W		San Diego Historic Landmark, NRHP listing: #80000842, also known as the Brooklyn Hotel
92	Whitney Building	1914	345 4th Avenue; 32.709067°N 117.160886°W		
93	Gaslamp Galleria Building	1924	744 6th Avenue; 32.713215°N 117.159373°W		

== See also ==
- List of San Diego Historic Landmarks
- National Register of Historic Places in San Diego County
