= Yamada Building =

Historic building in San Diego, California, U.S.

Coordinates: 32.710728°N 117.160264°W

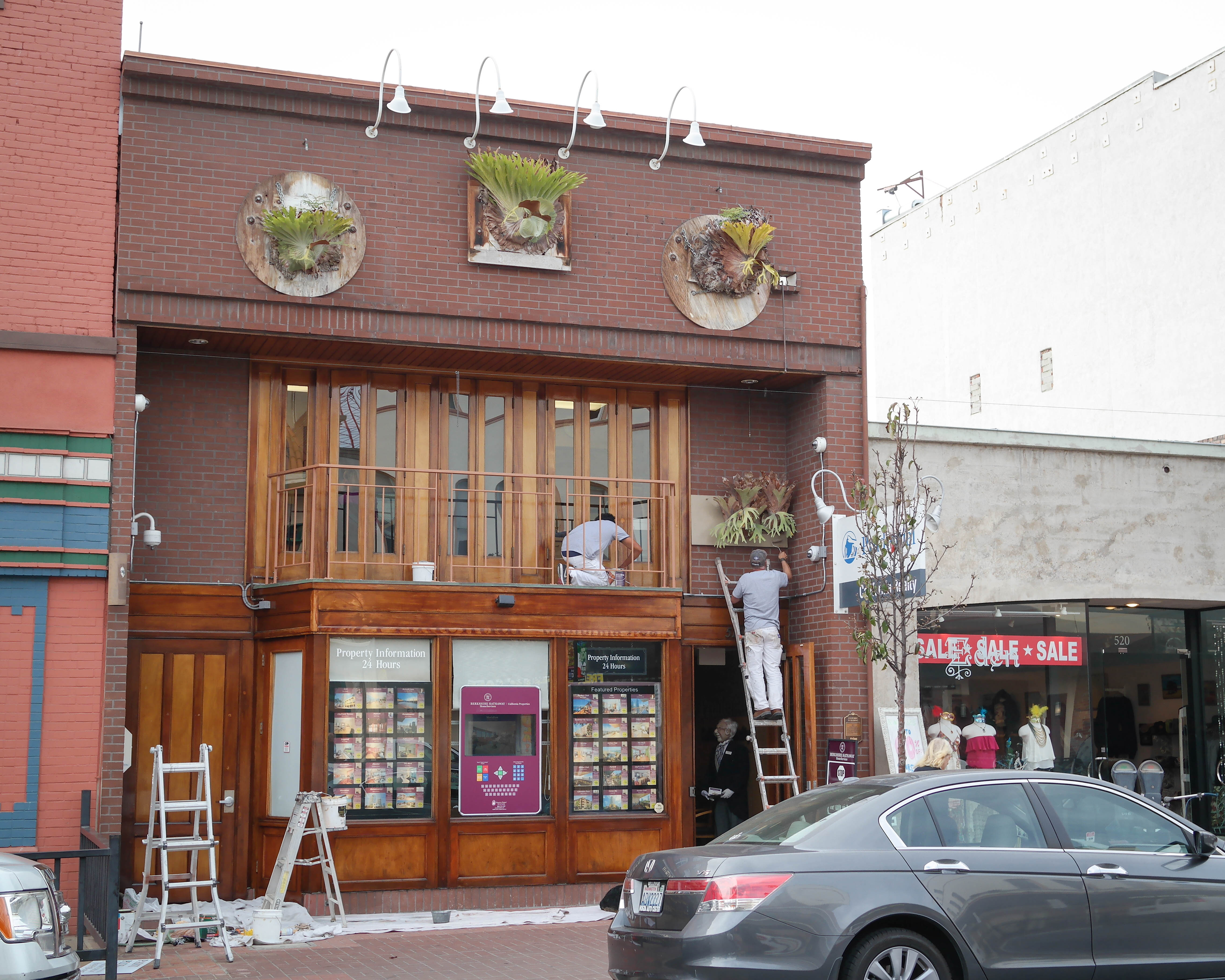
- Interactive map of the Yamada Building area

General information
- Location: California
- Opened: 1869

The Yamada Building is a historic structure located at 516 5th Avenue in San Diego's Gaslamp Quarter, in the U.S. state of California. It was built in 1869.

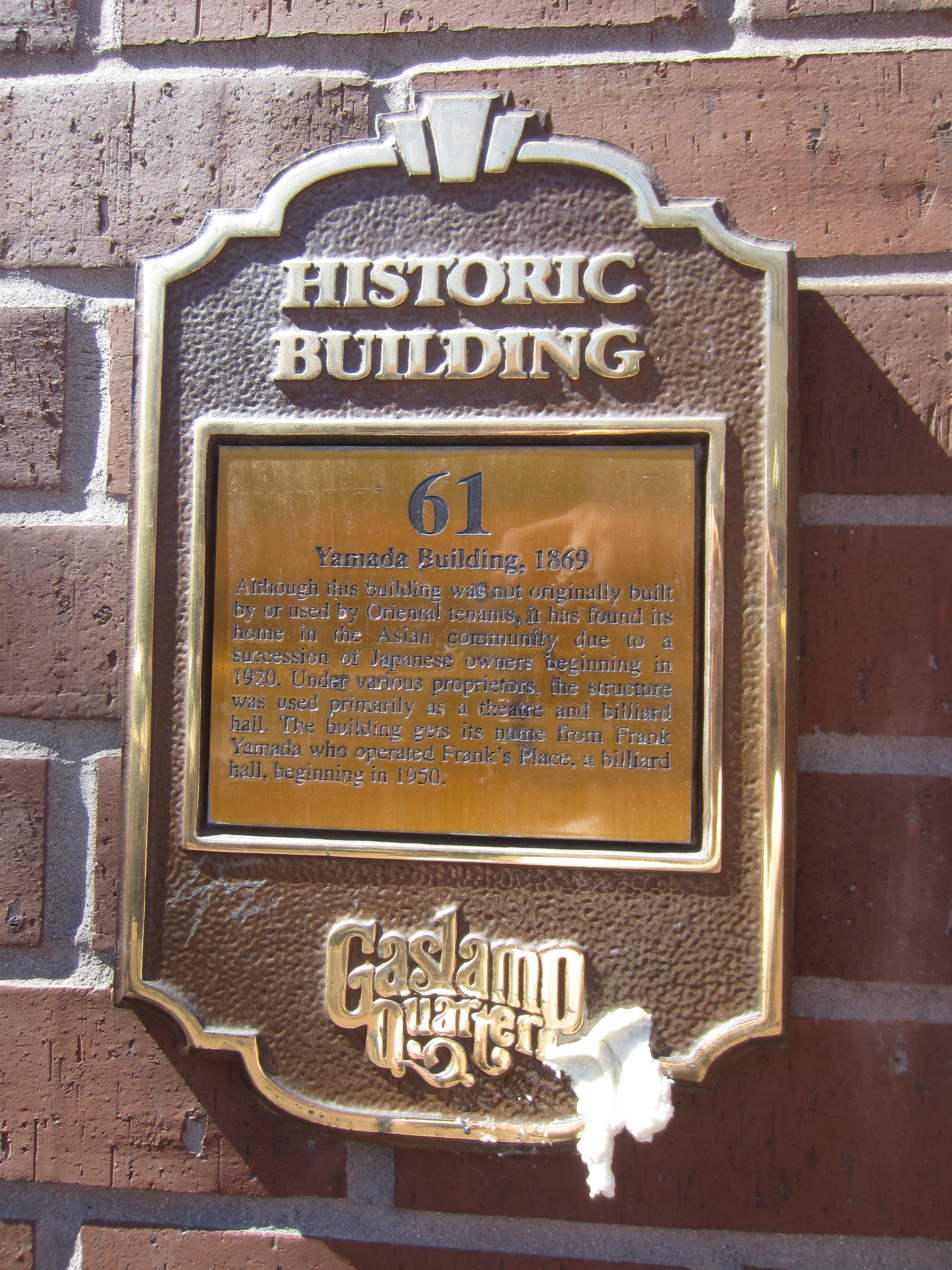
Plaque, 2016

== See also ==
- List of Gaslamp Quarter historic buildings
