= Sheldon Block =

Historic building in San Diego, California, U.S.

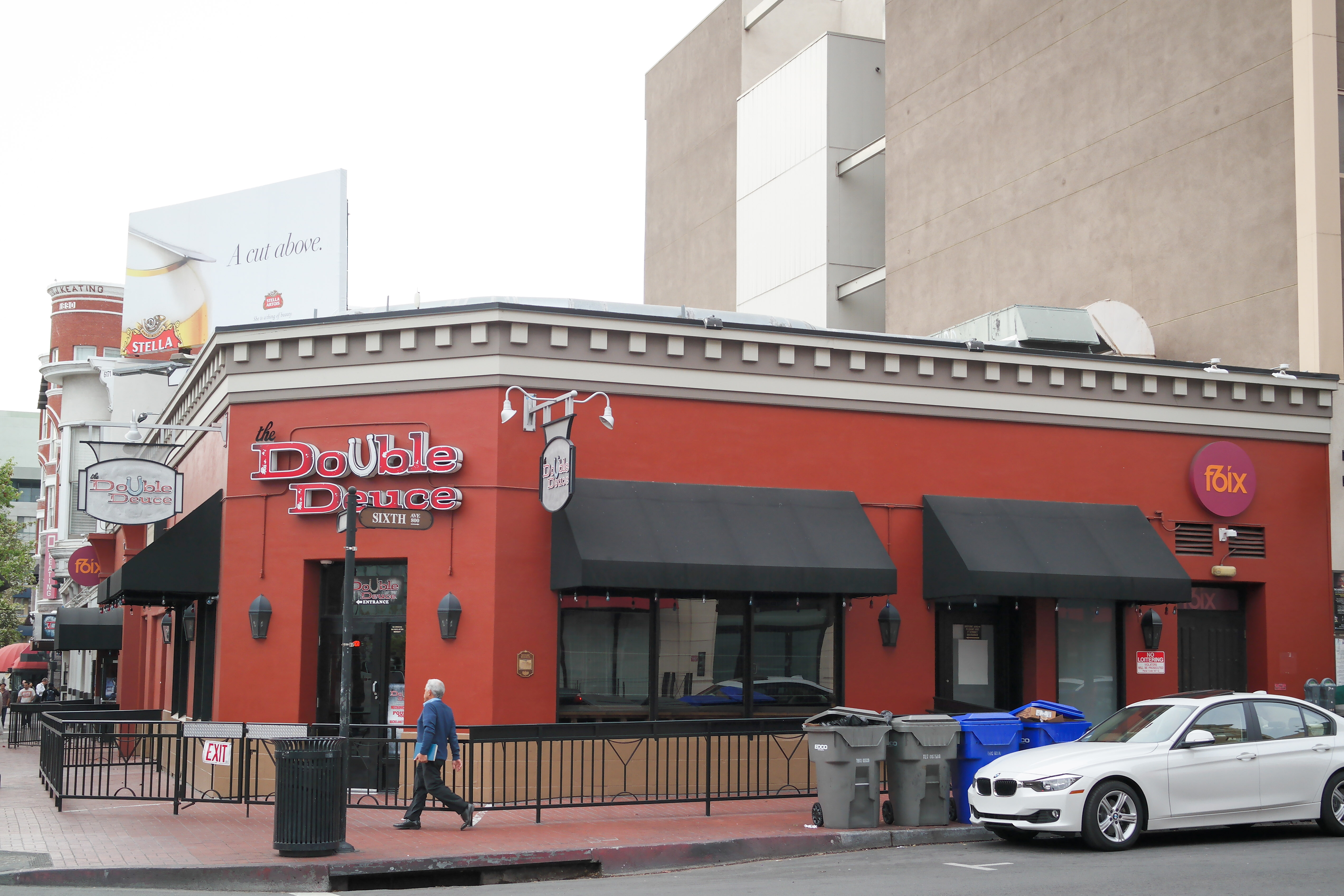
- The building's exterior in 2014
- Interactive map of the Sheldon Block area

General information
- Location: 822 6th Avenue, San Diego, United States
- Coordinates: 32.71382°N 117.15945°W
- Opened: 1888

The Sheldon Block is a historic structure located at 822 6th Avenue in San Diego's Gaslamp Quarter, in the U.S. state of California. It was built in 1888.

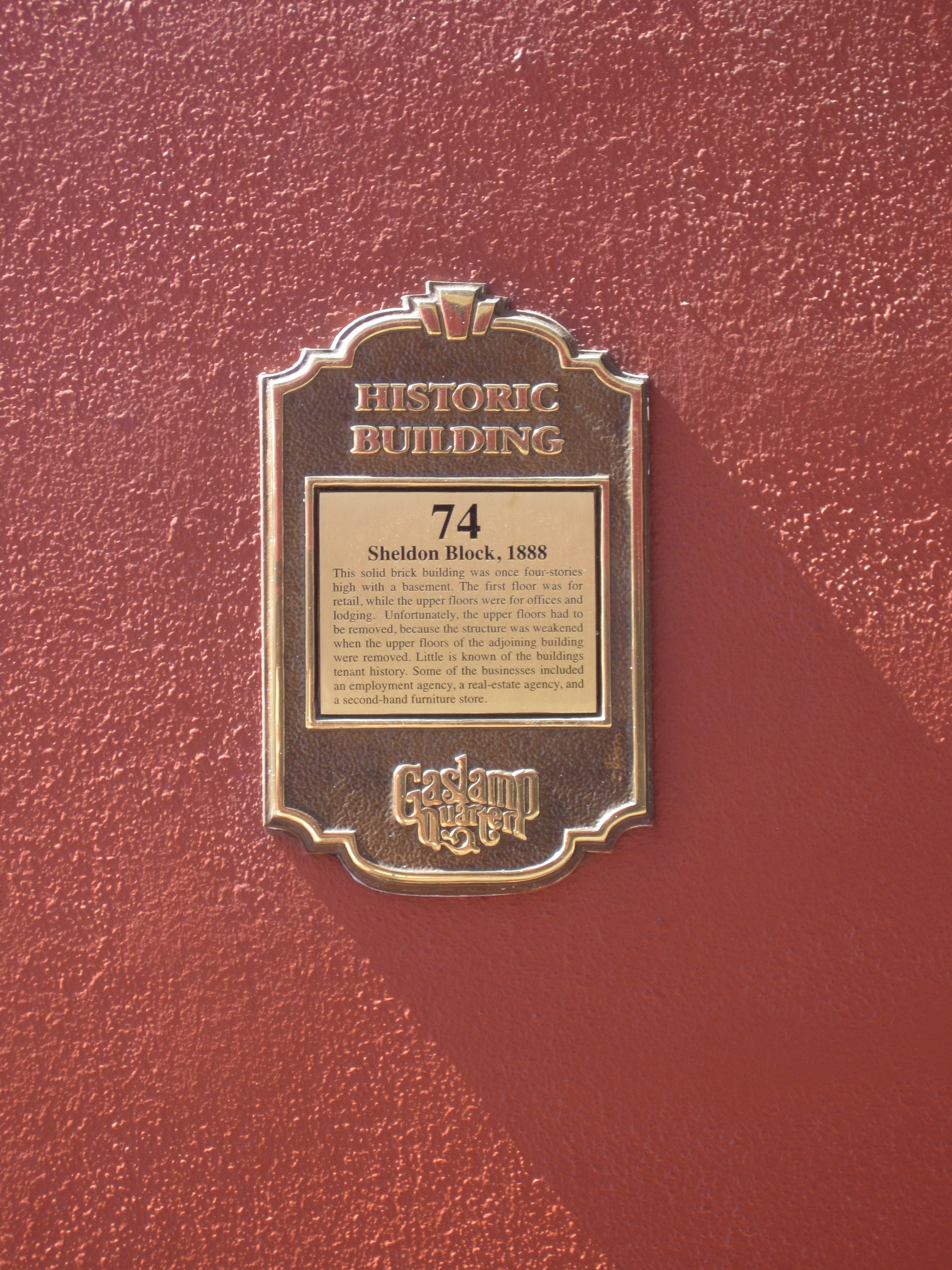
Plaque for the building, 2016

== See also ==
- List of Gaslamp Quarter historic buildings
