= Ingersoll–Tutton Building =

Historic building in San Diego, California, U.S.

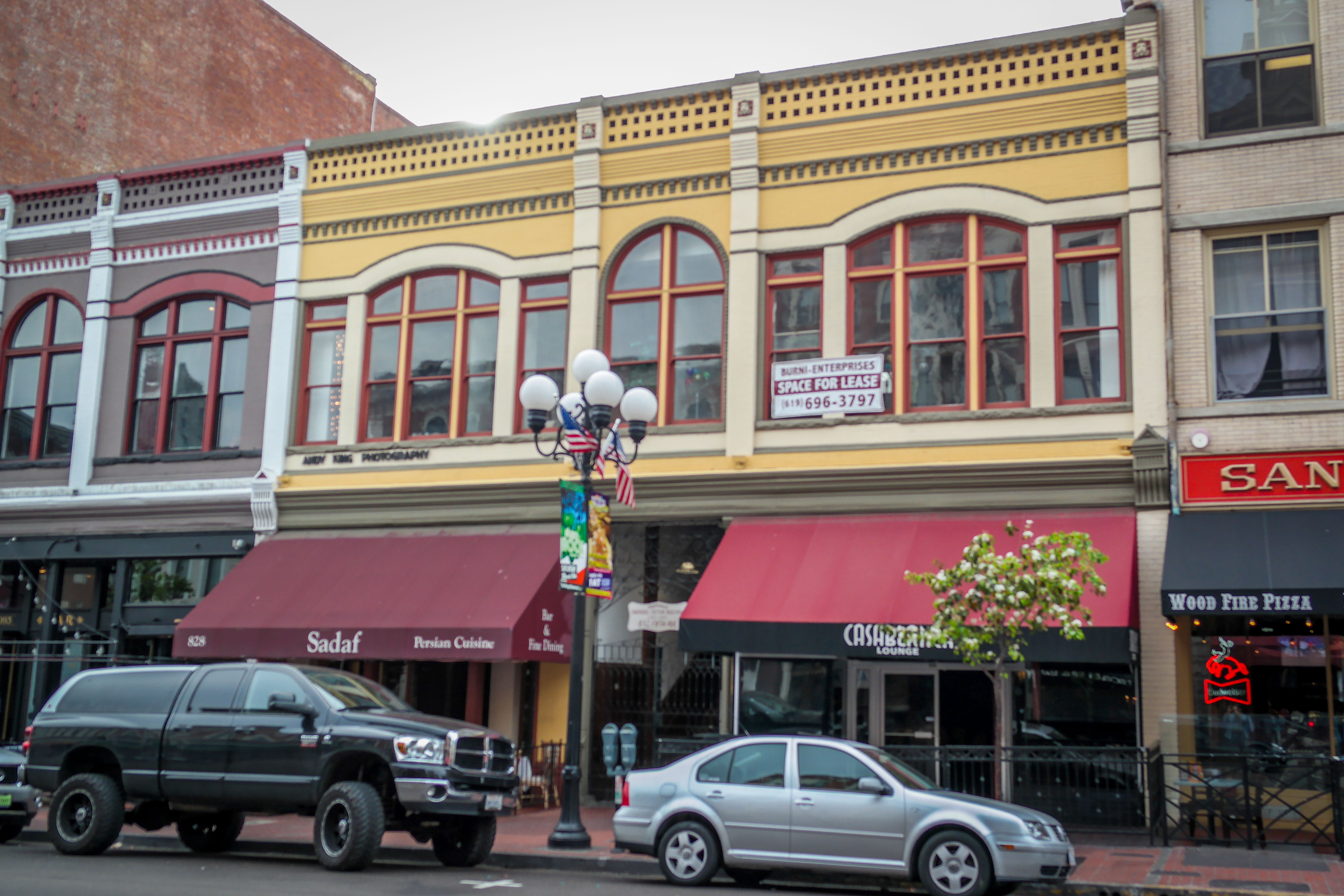
- The building's exterior in 2014
- Interactive map of the Ingersoll–Tutton Building area

General information
- Location: 832 5th Avenue, San Diego, United States
- Coordinates: 32.714073°N 117.160293°W
- Opened: 1894

The Ingersoll–Tutton Building is a historic structure located at 832 5th Avenue in San Diego's Gaslamp Quarter, in the U.S. state of California. It was built in 1894.

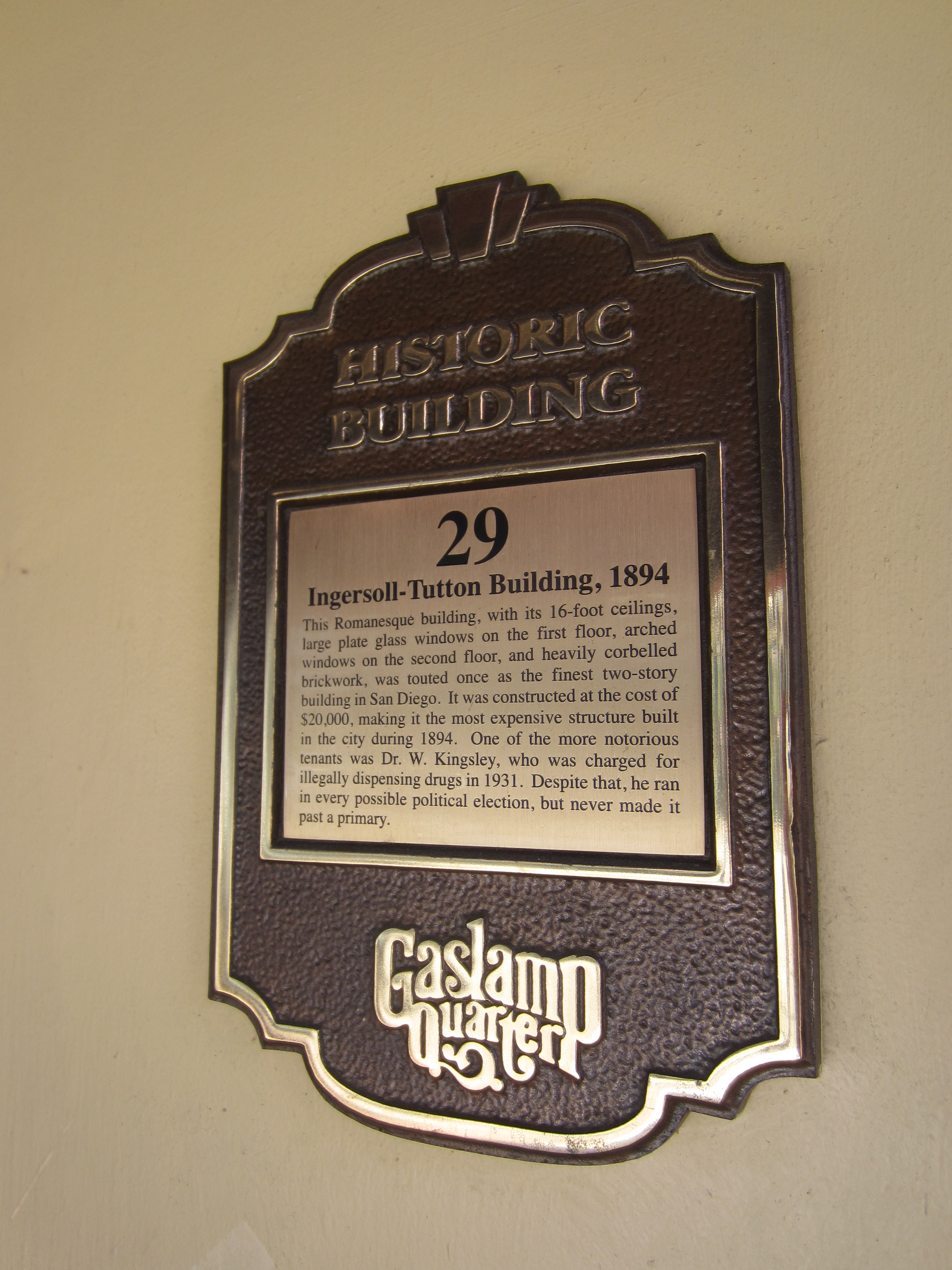
Plaque for the building, 2016

== See also ==
- List of Gaslamp Quarter historic buildings
