= National Register of Historic Places listings in San Diego County, California =

Location of San Diego County in California

This is a list of the National Register of Historic Places listings in San Diego County, California.

This is intended to be a complete list of the properties and districts on the National Register of Historic Places in San Diego County, California, United States. Latitude and longitude coordinates are provided for many National Register properties and districts; these locations may be seen together in an online map.

There are 164 properties and districts listed on the National Register in the county, including 17 National Historic Landmarks. Another 4 properties were once listed but have been removed.

This National Park Service list is complete through NPS recent listings posted October 30, 2026.

== Current listings ==
	Name on the Register	Image	Date listed	Location	City or town	Description
1	Americanization School	Americanization School	April 8, 1994 (#94000311)	1210 Division St. 33°11′46″N 117°22′16″W	Oceanside	
2	Anza Borrego-Palo Verde Site, S-2	Anza Borrego-Palo Verde Site, S-2	October 25, 1985 (#85003431)	Address Restricted	Borrego Springs	
3	Anza Borrego-Sin Nombre, S-4	Anza Borrego-Sin Nombre, S-4	October 25, 1985 (#85003432)	Address Restricted	Borrego Springs	
4	Anza Borrego-Split Mountain Site, S-3	Anza Borrego-Split Mountain Site, S-3	October 25, 1985 (#85003433)	Address Restricted	Borrego Springs	
5	Arnold and Choate's Addition-North Florence Heights Historic District		July 9, 2024 (#100010531)	Roughly bounded by Stephens Street, Eagle Street, Washington Place/Fort Stockton Drive, and Plumosa Way/Barr Avenue; 32°45′09″N 117°10′42″W	San Diego	
6	Russell E. and Virgie R. Babcock House		October 1, 2026 (#100013484)	2694 Bayside Walk; 32°45′41″N 117°14′57″W	San Diego	
7	Pearl Baker Row House	Pearl Baker Row House	September 30, 1993 (#93001018)	6122 Paseo Delicias; 33°01′15″N 117°12′06″W	Rancho Santa Fe	
8	Balboa Park	Balboa Park	December 22, 1977 (#77000331)	CA Quadrangle 41; 32°43′50″N 117°09′03″W	San Diego	
9	Balboa Theatre	Balboa Theatre	October 24, 1996 (#96001177)	868 4th Ave. 32°42′50″N 117°09′38″W	San Diego	
10	Hubert H. Bancroft Ranchhouse	Hubert H. Bancroft Ranchhouse	October 15, 1966 (#66000227)	Bancroft Dr. off CA 94; 32°44′11″N 116°59′18″W	Spring Valley	
11	Bandy House	Bandy House	January 12, 1993 (#92001754)	638 S. Juniper; 33°07′05″N 117°01′13″W	Escondido	
12	A.H. Beach House	A.H. Beach House	December 30, 1993 (#93001462)	700 S. Juniper; 33°07′04″N 117°04′25″W	Escondido	
13	Bear Valley Archeological Site		July 30, 1974 (#74000547)	Address Restricted	Pine Valley	
14	John R. and Florence Porterfield Beardsley House	John R. and Florence Porterfield Beardsley House	December 22, 2011 (#11000943)	3130 Shadowlawn St. 32°44′45″N 117°12′48″W	San Diego	
15	Berkeley (ferryboat)	Berkeley (ferryboat)	December 14, 1990 (#90002220)	B St. Pier; 32°43′07″N 117°10′22″W	San Diego	
16	Samuel Bingham House	Samuel Bingham House	August 5, 1991 (#91000942)	6427 La Plateada; 33°01′32″N 117°11′19″W	Rancho Santa Fe	
17	Ellis Bishop House	Ellis Bishop House	January 5, 1999 (#98001552)	4802 El Arco Iris; 33°00′20″N 117°13′43″W	Rancho Santa Fe	
18	William Black House-SDM-W-12 Locus A (CA-SDI-4669)	William Black House-SDM-W-12 Locus A (CA-SDI-4669)	May 2, 2008 (#08000343)	Address Restricted	La Jolla	
19	Charles A. Braun House	Charles A. Braun House	January 5, 1986 (#86000010)	790 Vale View Dr. 33°11′10″N 117°14′50″W	Vista	
20	Brick Row	Brick Row	July 16, 1973 (#73000431)	A Ave. between 9th and 10th Sts. 32°40′29″N 117°06′19″W	National City	
21	Bumann Ranch	Bumann Ranch	March 6, 2020 (#100004937)	3666 Bumann Rd. 33°03′28″N 117°12′08″W	Encinitas	
22	Burnham-Marston House	Burnham-Marston House	September 22, 1986 (#86002665)	3563 Seventh Ave. 32°44′34″N 117°09′23″W	San Diego	
23	Cabrillo (Ferry)	Cabrillo (Ferry)	April 3, 2025 (#100011611)	Broadway Pier, 990 N. Harbor Drive; 32°42′57″N 117°10′25″W	San Diego	
24	Cabrillo National Monument	Cabrillo National Monument	October 15, 1966 (#66000224)	10 miles (16 km) from San Diego off U.S. 10, near S tip of Point Loma; 32°40′18″N 117°14′26″W	San Diego	
25	California Quadrangle	California Quadrangle	May 17, 1974 (#74000548)	Balboa Park-El Prado Area; 32°43′53″N 117°09′06″W	San Diego	
26	Canfield-Wright House	Canfield-Wright House	May 14, 2004 (#02001747)	420 Avenida Primavera; 32°57′51″N 117°15′47″W	Del Mar	
27	Carlsbad Santa Fe Depot	Carlsbad Santa Fe Depot	September 30, 1993 (#93001016)	400 Carlsbad Village Dr. (Elm Ave.); 33°09′34″N 117°20′55″W	Carlsbad	Now houses Visitor Information Center
28	Norman and Florence B. Carmichael House	Norman and Florence B. Carmichael House	August 5, 1991 (#91000941)	6855 La Valle Plateada; 33°01′31″N 117°11′05″W	Rancho Santa Fe	
29	Case Study House No. 23C		July 24, 2013 (#13000521)	2329 Rue de Anne; 32°50′36″N 117°15′11″W	La Jolla	One of the Case Study Houses. Address 2339 is wrong in NRHP summary.
30	The Castle	The Castle	March 30, 1978 (#78000749)	West of Ramona; 33°00′49″N 116°57′17″W	Ramona	
31	Chaplain's House	Chaplain's House	November 24, 1978 (#78000750)	836 Washington St. 32°45′02″N 117°09′20″W	San Diego	
32	Chicano Park	Chicano Park	January 23, 2013 (#12001192)	Near National Ave. & Dewey St. 32°42′01″N 117°08′35″W	San Diego	
33	George A. C. Christiancy House	George A. C. Christiancy House	August 5, 1991 (#91000943)	17078 El Mirador; 33°01′45″N 117°11′17″W	Rancho Santa Fe	
34	City of San Diego Police Headquarters, Jails and Courts	City of San Diego Police Headquarters, Jails and Courts	July 9, 1998 (#98000833)	801 W. Market St. 32°42′39″N 117°10′09″W	San Diego	
35	Reginald M. and Constance Clotfelter Row House	Reginald M. and Constance Clotfelter Row House	August 5, 1991 (#91000939)	6112 Paseo Delicias; 33°01′14″N 117°12′08″W	Rancho Santa Fe	
36	Coulter House	Coulter House	September 30, 1983 (#83001227)	3162 2nd Ave. 32°44′18″N 117°09′42″W	San Diego	
37	Cuyamaca Village	Cuyamaca Village	April 2, 2008 (#07000935)	Address Restricted	San Diego	
38	Eagles Hall	Eagles Hall	October 4, 1985 (#85002723)	733 Eighth Ave. 32°42′47″N 117°09′21″W	San Diego	
39	Edgemoor Farm Dairy Barn	Edgemoor Farm Dairy Barn	May 16, 1985 (#85001065)	9064 Edgemoor Dr., Edgemoor Geriatric Hospital; 32°50′36″N 116°58′09″W	Santee	
40	El Cantorral Court		July 28, 2026 (#100013252)	2454-2474 Adams Avenue; 32°45′47″N 117°08′16″W	San Diego	
41	El Cortez Apartment Hotel	El Cortez Apartment Hotel	January 17, 2002 (#01001458)	702 Ash St. 32°43′14″N 117°09′25″W	San Diego	
42	El Prado Complex	El Prado Complex	December 12, 1976 (#76000515)	Balboa Park; 32°43′52″N 117°09′07″W	San Diego	
43	Elm Courts		July 28, 2026 (#100013251)	1730-1748 29th Street; 32°43′27″N 117°07′56″W	San Diego	
44	Encinitas Boathouses	Encinitas Boathouses	October 21, 2019 (#100004530)	726 & 732 3rd St. 33°02′33″N 117°17′45″W	Encinitas	
45	Estudillo House	Estudillo House	April 15, 1970 (#70000143)	4000 Mason St. 32°45′14″N 117°11′45″W	San Diego	
46	Fages-De Anza Trail-Southern Emigrant Road		January 29, 1973 (#73002252)	Anza-Borrego State Park	Borrego Springs	
47	Felicita County Park Prehistoric Village Site	Felicita County Park Prehistoric Village Site	January 31, 2008 (#07001470)	Address Restricted	Escondido	
48	Guy and Margaret Fleming House	Guy and Margaret Fleming House	June 18, 1998 (#98000700)	12279 Torrey Pines Park Rd. 32°55′19″N 117°15′18″W	San Diego	
49	Ford Building	Ford Building	April 26, 1973 (#73000433)	Balboa Park, Palisades Area; 32°43′34″N 117°09′13″W	San Diego	
50	Fort Rosecrans National Cemetery	Fort Rosecrans National Cemetery	March 8, 2016 (#16000054)	Cabrillo Memorial Dr. 32°41′12″N 117°14′41″W	San Diego	
51	Gaslamp Quarter Historic District	Gaslamp Quarter Historic District	May 23, 1980 (#80000841)	Bounded by RR tracks, Broadway, 4th, and 6th Sts. 32°42′42″N 117°09′33″W	San Diego	
52	Georgia Street Bridge-Caltrans Bridge	Georgia Street Bridge-Caltrans Bridge	February 12, 1999 (#99000158)	Georgia St. and University Ave., bet. Florida St. and Park Blvd. 32°44′55″N 117°08′40″W	San Diego	
53	John Ginty House	John Ginty House	December 18, 2006 (#06001157)	1568 Ninth Ave. 32°43′24″N 117°09′25″W	San Diego	
54	Grand-Horton Hotel	Grand-Horton Hotel	June 20, 1980 (#80000842)	332, 328 and 334 F St. 32°42′50″N 117°09′38″W	San Diego	
55	Granger Hall	Granger Hall	March 18, 1975 (#75000465)	1700 E. 4th St. 32°41′03″N 117°05′24″W	National City	
56	U.S. Grant Hotel	U.S. Grant Hotel	August 27, 1979 (#79000523)	326 Broadway St; 32°42′57″N 117°09′39″W	San Diego	
57	Guajome Ranch House	Guajome Ranch House	April 15, 1970 (#70000145)	2.5 miles (4.0 km) northeast of Vista; 33°13′45″N 117°15′19″W	Vista	
58	Alfred Haines House	Alfred Haines House	July 30, 1992 (#92000966)	2470 E St. 32°42′54″N 117°08′25″W	San Diego	
59	Hawthorne Inn	Hawthorne Inn	March 30, 1982 (#82002245)	2121 1st Ave. 32°43′38″N 117°09′46″W	San Diego	
60	Heart of Bankers Hill Historic District	Heart of Bankers Hill Historic District	October 17, 2024 (#100010887)	Generally bounded by W. Walnut Ave (north), Redwood Canyon (south), Brant and Curlew Streets (west), and Front Street (east); 32°44′23″N 117°09′57″W	San Diego	
61	Heilman Villas	Heilman Villas	April 8, 1992 (#92000319)	1060, 1070, 1080, 1090 Seventh St. and 706-720 (even nos.) Orange Ave. 32°41′24″N 117°10′37″W	Coronado	
62	Holzwasser-Walker Scott Building and Owl Drug Building	Holzwasser-Walker Scott Building and Owl Drug Building	February 27, 2005 (#05000072)	1014 Fifth ave. and 402-416 Broadway; 32°43′05″N 117°09′39″W	San Diego	
63	Hotel Charlotta	Hotel Charlotta	January 7, 1993 (#92001752)	637 S. Upas; 33°06′36″N 117°05′26″W	Escondido	
64	Hotel Del Coronado	Hotel Del Coronado	October 14, 1971 (#71000181)	1500 Orange Ave. 32°40′51″N 117°10′39″W	Coronado	
65	Howell House	Howell House	November 20, 1992 (#92001612)	103 W. Eighth St. 33°06′54″N 117°04′34″W	Escondido	
66	Independent Order of Odd Fellows Building	Independent Order of Odd Fellows Building	January 31, 1978 (#78000751)	526 Market St. 32°42′42″N 117°09′31″W	San Diego	
67	Initial Point of Boundary Between U.S. and Mexico	Initial Point of Boundary Between U.S. and Mexico	September 6, 1974 (#74000550)	South of Imperial Beach off Monument Rd. 32°32′04″N 117°07′19″W	San Diego	
68	Inspiration Heights Historic District		December 7, 2021 (#100007226)	Generally bounded by Sunset Blvd., Alameda Terr., St. James Pl., and Witherby St. 32°45′01″N 117°10′58″W	San Diego	
69	Institute of Geophysics and Planetary Physics	Institute of Geophysics and Planetary Physics	September 30, 2021 (#100007011)	8800 Biological Grade (Scripps Institution of Oceanography); 32°52′06″N 117°15′09″W	San Diego	
70	Johnson-Taylor Ranch Headquarters	Johnson-Taylor Ranch Headquarters	October 31, 1980 (#80000843)	East of San Diego and Black Mountain Rd. 32°56′18″N 117°08′18″W	San Diego	
71	Martha Kinsey House		August 7, 1992 (#92000968)	1624 Ludington Ln. 32°50′52″N 117°15′53″W	La Jolla	
72	Kuchamaa	Kuchamaa	October 6, 1992 (#92001268)	Southeast of San Diego at the US-Mexico border 32°34′38″N 116°41′28″W	Tecate	
73	Kwaaymii Homeland		August 11, 2015 (#15000506)	Address Restricted	Mount Laguna	
74	La Jolla Park Coastal Historic District	La Jolla Park Coastal Historic District	May 9, 2024 (#100009395)	From intersection of Coast Walk with Torrey Pines Rd. and following Coast Walk, then Coast Blvd. southwest to its southernmost intersection with South Coast Blvd. 32°50′55″N 117°16′05″W	La Jolla	
75	La Jolla Post Office	La Jolla Post Office	January 2, 2013 (#12001109)	1140 Wall St. 32°50′51″N 117°16′21″W	San Diego	
76	La Jolla Woman's Club	La Jolla Woman's Club	November 5, 1974 (#74000546)	715 Silverado St. 32°50′39″N 117°16′36″W	La Jolla	
77	Lafayette Hotel	Lafayette Hotel	July 31, 2012 (#12000443)	2223 El Cajon Blvd. 32°45′18″N 117°08′27″W	San Diego	
78	Las Flores Adobe	Las Flores Adobe	November 24, 1968 (#68000021)	Stuart Mesa Rd., about 7 miles (11 km) north of the junction -with Vandergrift Blvd. 33°17′59″N 117°27′23″W	Camp Pendleton	1865 Monterey Colonial, adjacent to Las Flores Estancia site
79	Las Flores Estancia	Las Flores Estancia	May 20, 1993 (#93000391)	Junction of Pulgas and Stuart Mesa Rds. 33°17′59″N 117°27′38″W	Camp Pendleton	same or different than Las Flores Adobe and Las Flores Site?
80	Las Flores Site	Las Flores Site	August 19, 1975 (#75000464)	Address Restricted	Camp Pendleton	Archaeological Site
81	Robert E. Lee Hotel		May 31, 1980 (#80000844)	815 3rd Ave. and 314 F St. 32°42′50″N 117°09′39″W	San Diego	Demolished during Westfield Horton Plaza construction
82	Charles Libby House	Charles Libby House	July 12, 1978 (#78000748)	636 Rockledge St. 33°11′29″N 117°21′58″W	Oceanside	
83	Lindstrom House	Lindstrom House	February 13, 2001 (#01000027)	4669 E. Talmadge Dr. 32°45′51″N 117°05′54″W	San Diego	
84	Long-Waterman House	Long-Waterman House	June 14, 1976 (#76000516)	2408 1st Ave. 32°43′49″N 117°09′48″W	San Diego	
85	Marine Corps Recruit Depot Historic District	Marine Corps Recruit Depot Historic District	January 31, 1991 (#90001477)	South of the junction of Barnett Ave. and Pacific Hwy. 32°44′31″N 117°11′50″W	San Diego	
86	George W. Marston House	George W. Marston House	December 16, 1974 (#74000552)	3525 7th Ave. 32°44′29″N 117°09′26″W	San Diego	
87	McClintock Storage Warehouse	McClintock Storage Warehouse	October 3, 1980 (#80000845)	1202 Kettner Blvd. 32°43′05″N 117°10′07″W	San Diego	
88	Medico-Dental Building	Medico-Dental Building	September 4, 1979 (#79000524)	233 A St. 32°43′06″N 117°09′41″W	San Diego	
89	Mission Beach Roller Coaster	Mission Beach Roller Coaster	December 27, 1978 (#78000753)	3000 Mission Blvd. 32°46′18″N 117°15′00″W	San Diego	
90	Mission Brewery	Mission Brewery	July 6, 1989 (#89000805)	1715 Hancock St. 32°44′30″N 117°10′59″W	San Diego	
91	Mohnike Adobe	Mohnike Adobe	July 17, 2002 (#02000779)	12115 Black Mountain Rd. 32°56′18″N 117°07′41″W	San Diego	
92	Montecito Ranch House	Montecito Ranch House	July 10, 2017 (#100001284)	1080 Montecito Way; 33°03′05″N 116°54′18″W	Ramona	
93	Maj. Myles Moylan House	Maj. Myles Moylan House	March 22, 1984 (#84001181)	2214-2224 2nd Ave. 32°43′43″N 117°09′44″W	San Diego	
94	Walter and Judith Munk House		July 12, 2021 (#100006710)	9530 La Jolla Shores Dr. 32°52′24″N 117°14′42″W	San Diego	
95	Naval Air Station, San Diego, Historic District	Naval Air Station, San Diego, Historic District	May 21, 1991 (#91000590)	Naval Air Station, North Island, N. shore 32°42′42″N 117°11′39″W	Coronado	
96	Naval Training Center	Naval Training Center	July 5, 2001 (#00000426)	Barnett St. and Rosecrans Blvd. 32°44′08″N 117°12′44″W	San Diego	
97	Oak Grove Butterfield Stage Station	Oak Grove Butterfield Stage Station	October 15, 1966 (#66000222)	13 miles (21 km) northwest of Warner Springs on CA 79; 33°23′23″N 116°47′39″W	Oak Grove	
98	Oceanside City Hall and Fire Station	Oceanside City Hall and Fire Station	June 7, 1989 (#89000257)	704 and 714 Pier View Way (704 and 714 Third St.); 33°11′53″N 117°22′40″W	Oceanside	
99	Old Mission Dam	Old Mission Dam	October 15, 1966 (#66000225)	N side of Mission St.-Gorge Rd. 32°50′24″N 117°02′32″W	San Diego	
100	Old Point Loma Lighthouse	Old Point Loma Lighthouse	June 27, 1974 (#74000350)	Included in Cabrillo National Monument; 32°40′19″N 117°14′25″W	San Diego	
101	Old Town San Diego Historic District	Old Town San Diego Historic District	September 3, 1971 (#71000182)	Junction of US 5 and US 80; 32°45′15″N 117°11′47″W	San Diego	
102	Olivenhain Town Meeting Hall	Olivenhain Town Meeting Hall	December 17, 1993 (#93001395)	423 Rancho Santa Fe Rd. 33°02′36″N 117°14′04″W	Olivenhain	
103	Juan Maria Osuna Adobe	Juan Maria Osuna Adobe	July 10, 2017 (#100001285)	16332 Via de Santa Fe; 33°00′39″N 117°11′57″W	Rancho Santa Fe	
104	PCF 816 (patrol craft fast)	PCF 816 (patrol craft fast)	July 23, 2018 (#100002676)	1492 N. Harbor Dr. 32°43′14″N 117°10′24″W	San Diego	
105	Panama Hotel	Panama Hotel	March 22, 1984 (#84001182)	105 W. F St. 32°42′48″N 117°09′47″W	San Diego	
106	Park Place Methodist Episcopal Church South	Park Place Methodist Episcopal Church South	September 15, 1983 (#83003432)	508 Olive St. 32°44′06″N 117°09′32″W	San Diego	
107	Robert O. Peterson-Russell Forester House	Robert O. Peterson-Russell Forester House	April 11, 2014 (#14000136)	567 Gage Ln. 32°42′50″N 117°14′31″W	San Diego	
108	Pilot (boat)	Pilot (boat)	February 1, 2011 (#10001160)	Maritime Museum of San Diego, 1492 N Harbor Dr. 32°43′15″N 117°10′28″W	San Diego	
109	Portuguese Chapel of San Diego	Portuguese Chapel of San Diego	April 17, 2017 (#100000881)	2818 Avenida de Portugal; 32°43′17″N 117°13′48″W	San Diego	
110	Pythias Lodge Building	Pythias Lodge Building	April 8, 1981 (#81000171)	211 E St. and 870 3rd Ave. 32°42′52″N 117°09′41″W	San Diego	Demolished during Westfield Horton Plaza construction; facade replica within mall shown
111	Ramona Main Street Colonnade	Ramona Main Street Colonnade	October 5, 2018 (#100002995)	CA 67/78 - Main St. 33°02′09″N 116°52′47″W	Ramona	
112	Ramona Town Hall	Ramona Town Hall	September 26, 1994 (#94001161)	729 Main St. 33°02′41″N 116°51′48″W	Ramona	
113	Rancho De Los Kiotes	Rancho De Los Kiotes	March 31, 1992 (#92000261)	6200 Flying L.C. Lane; 33°07′13″N 117°14′08″W	Carlsbad	
114	Rancho Santa Fe Land and Improvement Company Office	Rancho Santa Fe Land and Improvement Company Office	August 5, 1991 (#91000940)	16915 Avenida de Acacias; 33°01′10″N 117°12′11″W	Rancho Santa Fe	
115	Red Rest and Red Roost Cottages	Red Rest and Red Roost Cottages	March 15, 1976 (#76002247)	1187 and 1179 Coast Blvd. 32°50′59″N 117°16′18″W	La Jolla	
116	Renown (yacht)	Renown (yacht)	January 4, 2012 (#11000990)	San Diego Marriott Marina, A Dock, 333 W. Harbor Dr. 32°42′30″N 117°10′07″W	San Diego	Docked at Grape Street marina as of July 2014
117	Lilian Jenette Rice House	Lilian Jenette Rice House	August 5, 1991 (#91000946)	16780 La Gracia; 33°01′03″N 117°12′16″W	Rancho Santa Fe	
118	Robinson Hotel	Robinson Hotel	June 23, 1978 (#78000747)	2032 Main St. 33°04′40″N 116°36′01″W	Julian	
119	Rockwell Field	Rockwell Field	May 21, 1991 (#75002185)	North Island; 32°41′48″N 117°11′49″W	Coronado	
120	Rosecroft	Rosecroft	September 22, 2003 (#03000472)	530 Silvergate Ave. 32°41′51″N 117°14′44″W	San Diego	
121	Rosicrucian Fellowship Temple	Rosicrucian Fellowship Temple	April 7, 1995 (#95000390)	2222 Mission Ave. 33°12′36″N 117°21′30″W	Oceanside	
122	Ruiz-Alvarado Ranch Site	Ruiz-Alvarado Ranch Site	January 22, 1982 (#82002246)	Address Restricted	San Diego	
123	San Antonio de Pala Asistencia	San Antonio de Pala Asistencia	September 10, 2026 (#100013377)	11798 Pala Mission Road; 33°21′56″N 117°04′28″W	Pala	
124	San Diego Armed Services YMCA	San Diego Armed Services YMCA	November 15, 2007 (#07001177)	500 W Broadway; 32°42′58″N 117°10′05″W	San Diego	Now the Guild Hotel
125	San Diego Athletic Club	San Diego Athletic Club	April 3, 2013 (#13000130)	1250 6th Ave. 32°43′07″N 117°09′34″W	San Diego	
126	San Diego Civic Center	San Diego Civic Center	May 16, 1988 (#88000554)	1600 Pacific Hwy. 32°43′52″N 117°10′15″W	San Diego	
127	San Diego Fire Department Shops at Station 6	San Diego Fire Department Shops at Station 6	January 27, 2015 (#14001204)	1572 Columbia St. 32°43′18″N 117°10′03″W	San Diego	
128	San Diego Mission Church	San Diego Mission Church	April 15, 1970 (#70000144)	5 miles (8.0 km) east of Old Town San Diego on Friars Rd. 32°47′04″N 117°06′23″W	San Diego	
129	San Diego Presidio	San Diego Presidio	October 15, 1966 (#66000226)	Presidio Park; 32°45′31″N 117°11′36″W	San Diego	
130	San Diego Rowing Club	San Diego Rowing Club	August 30, 1979 (#79000525)	525 E. Harbor Dr; 32°42′16″N 117°09′44″W	San Diego	
131	San Diego State College	San Diego State College	September 4, 1997 (#97000924)	5300 Campanile Dr. 32°46′33″N 117°04′16″W	San Diego	
132	San Diego Trust and Savings Bank Building	San Diego Trust and Savings Bank Building	December 17, 1999 (#99001565)	530-540 Broadway; 32°42′57″N 117°09′31″W	San Diego	
133	San Diego Veterans' War Memorial Building-Balboa Park	San Diego Veterans' War Memorial Building-Balboa Park	September 28, 2000 (#00001167)	3325 Zoo Dr. 32°44′19″N 117°08′50″W	San Diego	
134	San Luis Rey Mission Church	San Luis Rey Mission Church	April 15, 1970 (#70000142)	4 miles (6.4 km) east of Oceanside on CA 76; 33°13′57″N 117°19′10″W	Oceanside	
135	Santa Fe Depot	Santa Fe Depot	June 26, 1972 (#72000248)	1050 Kettner St. 32°43′01″N 117°10′07″W	San Diego	
136	Santa Margarita Ranchhouse	Santa Margarita Ranchhouse	May 6, 1971 (#71000180)	Off Vandergrift Blvd. 33°18′36″N 117°20′25″W	Camp Pendleton	
137	George H. Scripps Memorial Marine Biological Laboratory	George H. Scripps Memorial Marine Biological Laboratory	November 10, 1977 (#77000330)	8602 La Jolla Shores Dr. 32°51′54″N 117°15′12″W	La Jolla	
138	Charles A. Shaffer House	Charles A. Shaffer House	August 5, 1991 (#91000944)	5610 La Crescenta; 33°02′28″N 117°12′54″W	Rancho Santa Fe	
139	Silvergate (Ferry)	Silvergate (Ferry)	April 3, 2025 (#100011612)	Fifth Avenue Landing, 600 Convention Way; 32°42′19″N 117°09′48″W	San Diego	
140	Sorrento Valley Site		October 21, 1975 (#75000466)	Address Restricted	San Diego	
141	Spreckels Theatre Building	Spreckels Theatre Building	May 28, 1975 (#75000467)	123 W. Broadway; 32°42′55″N 117°09′45″W	San Diego	
142	St. Matthew's Episcopal Church	St. Matthew's Episcopal Church	October 25, 1973 (#73000432)	521 E. 8th St. 32°40′40″N 117°06′02″W	National City	
143	Star of India (ship)	Star of India (ship)	November 13, 1966 (#66000223)	San Diego Embarcadero; 32°42′57″N 117°10′22″W	San Diego	
144	Station and General Office, California Southern Railroad	Station and General Office, California Southern Railroad	April 18, 1996 (#96000424)	900 W. 23rd St. 32°39′36″N 117°06′38″W	National City	
145	Sunnyslope Lodge	Sunnyslope Lodge	September 24, 1999 (#99001180)	3733 Robinson Mews; 32°44′44″N 117°09′52″W	San Diego	
146	A. H. Sweet Residence and Adjacent Small House	A. H. Sweet Residence and Adjacent Small House	April 16, 1987 (#87000621)	435 W. Spruce and 3141 Curlew Sts. 32°44′18″N 117°09′59″W	San Diego	
147	Table Mountain District		October 28, 1983 (#83003593)	Address Restricted	Jacumba	
148	Talmadge Park Estates Historic District		March 25, 2024 (#100010106)	Roughly bounded by 44th and 49th Streets; Norma, Constance and Natalie Drives; Adams and Monroe Avenues; 32°45′44″N 117°05′40″W	San Diego	
149	Teacher Training School Building-San Diego State Normal School	Teacher Training School Building-San Diego State Normal School	September 9, 1998 (#98001193)	4345 Campus Ave. 32°45′20″N 117°08′47″W	San Diego	
150	Claude and Florence Terwilliger House	Claude and Florence Terwilliger House	August 5, 1991 (#91000945)	5880 San Elijo; 33°02′02″N 117°12′20″W	Rancho Santa Fe	
151	Thomas House	Thomas House	December 30, 1992 (#92001684)	208 E. Fifth Ave. 33°07′08″N 117°04′36″W	Escondido	
152	Torrey Pines Gliderport	Torrey Pines Gliderport	July 12, 1993 (#93000578)	West of Torrey Pines Rd., bordering Torrey Pines Scenic Dr. and south and west of Torrey Pines Golf Course; 32°53′23″N 117°14′54″W	San Diego	1930 Glider site, still used today for paragliding and hang gliding.
153	Torrey Pines Lodge	Torrey Pines Lodge	June 18, 1998 (#98000699)	12201 Torrey Pines Park Rd. 32°55′15″N 117°15′03″W	San Diego	
154	Torrey Pines Park Road	Torrey Pines Park Road	October 22, 1998 (#98001248)	Roughly the North/South R. within Torrey Pines State Natural Reserve; 32°55′10″N 117°15′03″W	San Diego	
155	University Heights Water Storage and Pumping Station Historic District	University Heights Water Storage and Pumping Station Historic District	June 24, 2013 (#13000417)	4236 Idaho St. 32°45′16″N 117°08′03″W	San Diego	One building, three sites, and six structures
156	U.S. Courthouse	U.S. Courthouse	January 29, 1975 (#75000468)	325 W. F St. 32°42′48″N 117°09′55″W	San Diego	
157	U.S. Inspection Station/U.S. Custom House	U.S. Inspection Station/U.S. Custom House	February 10, 1983 (#83001228)	Virginia and Tijuana Sts. 32°32′34″N 117°01′41″W	San Ysidro	
158	US Inspection Station-Tecate	US Inspection Station-Tecate	February 14, 1992 (#91001748)	CA 188; 32°34′36″N 116°37′36″W	Tecate	
159	US Post Office-Downtown Station	US Post Office-Downtown Station	January 11, 1985 (#85000137)	815 E St. 32°42′51″N 117°09′22″W	San Diego	
160	Theophile Verlaque House	Theophile Verlaque House	August 7, 1991 (#91000548)	645 Main St. 33°02′43″N 116°51′43″W	Ramona	
161	Villa Montezuma	Villa Montezuma	May 6, 1971 (#71000183)	1925 K St. 32°42′29″N 117°08′46″W	San Diego	
162	Warner's Ranch	Warner's Ranch	October 15, 1966 (#66000228)	4 miles (6.4 km) south of Warner Springs; 33°14′19″N 116°39′03″W	Warner Springs	
163	Watts Building	Watts Building	April 26, 1979 (#79000526)	520 E St. 32°42′53″N 117°09′32″W	San Diego	
164	Wiipuk uun'yaw Trail		January 17, 2017 (#100000463)	Address Restricted	Mount Laguna vicinity	

== Former listings ==
	Name on the Register	Image	Date listed	Date removed	Location	City or town	Description
1	Aztec Bowl	Aztec Bowl	May 19, 1994 (#94000402)	May 30, 2012	Hardy Ave. between 55th St. and Campanile Dr., San Diego State University; 32°46′26″N 117°04′26″W	San Diego	
2	William Heath Davis House	William Heath Davis House	February 15, 1974 (#74000549)	December 16, 1988	227 11th St.	San Diego	Removed from the Register due to relocation to 410 Island Avenue in 1984.
3	Melville Klauber House		November 13, 1974 (#74000551)	June 3, 1980	3060 6th Ave.	San Diego	Demolished in 1979
4	Temple Beth Israel	Temple Beth Israel	May 22, 1978 (#78000752)	September 28, 1983	1502 2nd Ave.	San Diego	Delisted due to relocation to Heritage Park in 1983.

== See also ==
- California Historical Landmarks in San Diego County, California
- List of San Diego Historic Landmarks
  - List of San Diego Historical Landmarks in La Jolla
  - List of San Diego Historic Landmarks in the Point Loma and Ocean Beach areas
- List of National Historic Landmarks in California
- Lists of National Register of Historic Places in California by county
