= List of museums in San Diego County, California =

This is a list of museums in San Diego County, California, defined for this context as institutions (including nonprofit organizations, government entities, and private businesses) that collect and care for objects of cultural, artistic, scientific, or historical interest and make their collections or related exhibits available for public viewing. Also included are non-profit and university art galleries. Museums that exist only in cyberspace (i.e., virtual museums) are not included.

To use the sortable tables: click on the icons at the top of each column to sort that column in alphabetical order; click again for reverse alphabetical order.

== Museums ==
Name	Image	Town/City	Type	Summary
Antique Gas and Steam Engine Museum		Vista	Open air	Antique gas and steam engines, blacksmith shop, weaving house, farmhouse exhibits
Bancroft Ranch House Museum		Spring Valley	Historic house	Operated by the Spring Valley Historical Society, late 19th-century adobe ranch house
Barona Cultural Center & Museum		Lakeside	Native American	website, Native American culture and history of San Diego County
Bonita Museum & Cultural Center		Bonita	Local history	website, operated by the Bonita Historical Society, history of the Rancho de la Nación, art and culture
Brain Observatory		San Diego	laboratory	https://www.thebrainobservatory.org/ Neuroscience research laboratory that offers immersive science experiences. Designed to complement classroom learning by providing hands-on engagement with real research, data, and actual human brains.
Cabrillo National Monument		San Diego	History	Includes a museum and the Old Point Loma lighthouse
California Center for the Arts Museum		Escondido	Art	https://www.ccaemuseum.org/ Museum serves to foster meaningful engagement with contemporary art and visual culture from the Californias.
California Surf Museum		Oceanside	Sports	
Carrillo Ranch Historic Park		Carlsbad	Historic house	website, also known as Rancho de Los Kiotes, ranch and home of Leo Carrillo
Casa de Estudillo		San Diego	Historic house	Located in Old Town San Diego State Historic Park, 19th century adobe house
Casa de Machado y Stewart		San Diego	Historic house	Located in Old Town San Diego State Historic Park, 19th century adobe house
Centro Cultural de la Raza		San Diego	Cultural	Located in Balboa Park, Mexican-American and Latino cultural arts center
Chicano Park Museum and Cultural Center		San Diego	Cultural	Located in Chicano Park in Barrio Logan
Children's Museum of Discovery		Escondido	Children's Museum	https://visitcmod.org/ Focuses on learning through hands-on play.
Chula Vista Heritage Museum		Chula Vista	Local history	Branch of the Chula Vista Public Library
Comic-Con Museum		Located in Balboa Park		
Coronado Historical Association		Coronado	Local history	https://coronadohistory.org/
Craftsmanship Museum		Carlsbad	Technology	Finely crafted models, engines, technology
Deer Park Winery & Auto Museum		Escondido	Automobile	website, features vintage vehicles and Americana collections, including Barbie dolls, Coca-Cola memorabilia, vintage radios, TVs, bicycles, household appliances
Encinitas Historical Society Schoolhouse		Encinitas	School	website, restored 1883 schoolhouse
Escondido History Center		Escondido	Open air	website, six building museum in Grape Day Park
Fallbrook Art Center		Fallbrook	Art	website
Fallbrook Gem and Mineral Society Museum		Fallbrook	Natural history	website, minerals and gems from around the world
Fallbrook Historical Society		Fallbrook	Local history	website, includes main museum and Pittenger House
Fleet Science Center		San Diego	Science	Located in Balboa Park
Flying Leatherneck Aviation Museum		San Diego	Aviation	Aircraft, memorabilia and history of the United States Marine Corps Aviation
Gaskill Brothers' Stone Store Museum		Campo	Local history	website, operated by the Mountain Empire Historical Society, area Native American, pioneer and military history
Guy B. Woodward Museum		Ramona	Local history	website, operated by the Ramona Pioneer Historical Society, includes the Verlaque House, shops, antique exhibits and artifacts
Gaslamp Museum at the William Heath Davis House		San Diego	Historic house	website, mid 19th-century Victorian period house of William Heath Davis, operated by the Gaslamp Quarter Historical Foundation
Heritage Museum (Poway Historical Society)	Heritage Museum, located in Old Poway Park. Operated by the Poway Historical Society.	Poway	Historical houses	
Heritage County Park		San Diego	Historic house	Park with 7 relocated buildings, Senlis Cottage open as late 19th-century working class cottage, Temple Beth Israel open for tours
Heritage of the Americas Museum		Rancho San Diego	Multiple	website, part of Cuyamaca College, prehistoric and historic art, culture, and natural history of the Americas
Heritage Park Village Museum		Oceanside	Open air	Historic and replica buildings including a general store, blacksmith shop and livery stables, jail, inn, school and newspaper building
Ilan-Lael Foundation		Julian	Historic house	https://ilanlaelfoundation.org/ Artist James Hubbell's home and studio
J.A. Cooley Automotive Museum		San Diego	Commodity	Antique automobiles, nickelodeons and phonographs, Kodak cameras, clocks, standard gauge electric trains, and 20 other types of collections
John DeWitt Museum and Library		Alpine	Historic house	website, operated by the Alpine Historical Society
Julian Pioneer Museum		Julian	Local history	website, Native American artifacts, antique furniture, tools, clothing, cooking items, farm implements, photos, pioneer items
Junipero Serra Museum		San Diego	History	History of the founding of the city, operated by the San Diego Historical Society in Presidio Park
Knox House Museum		El Cajon	Historic house	Part of Cuyamaca College, operated by the El Cajon Historical Society
Kruglak Art Gallery		Oceanside	Art	website, contemporary art gallery of MiraCosta College
Lakeside Museum		Lakeside	Local history	website, operated by the Lakeside Historical Society
Lawrence Welk Museum		Escondido	Biographical	Part of the Lawrence Welk Resort, tribute to bandleader Lawrence Welk
Lux Art Institute		Encinitas	Art	website
Magee House Museum		Carlsbad	Historic house	website, operated by the Carlsbad Historical Society, Victorian period house, displays of local history, agriculture
Maritime Museum of San Diego		San Diego	Maritime	Several museum ships including the Star of India, an 1863 iron bark
George W Marston House		San Diego	Historic house	Located in Balboa Park, operated by Save Our Heritage Organisation
Mason Street School		San Diego	School	Located in Old Town San Diego State Historic Park, first public schoolhouse in the county
MCRD San Diego Command Museum		San Diego	Military	History of the Marines in the 20th and 21st centuries, the Marines' presence in the Southern California region, and the history of Marine Corps Recruit Depot San Diego
McKinney House and Museum		La Mesa	Historic house	Operated by the La Mesa Historical Society, early 20th-century house
Mingei International Museum		San Diego	Art	Located in Balboa Park, folk art, craft and design from all eras and cultures of the world
Mission San Diego de Alcalá		San Diego	Religious	1769 Franciscan mission church
Mission San Luis Rey de Francia		Oceanside	History	Historic Spanish mission and church, cemetery, lavandaria, and museum.
Mormon Battalion Historic Site		San Diego	Military	website, located in Old Town San Diego State Historic Park, history of the Mormon Battalion
Motor Transport Museum		Campo	Transportation	website, trucks, engines, quarry equipment and other equipment
Museum of American Treasures		National City	Local history	
Museum of Contemporary Art San Diego		San Diego	Art	Collection includes more than 4,000 works created after 1950 in all media and genres
Museum of Coronado History and Art		Coronado	Multiple	website, island history and art, operated by the Coronado Historical Association
Museum of Creation and Earth History		Santee	Religious	
Museum of Making Music		Carlsbad	Music	History of American popular music, the manufacture and retail of musical instruments and the history of the music products industry
Museum of Photographic Arts		San Diego	Art	Located in Balboa Park, photography, film and video
Museum of Us		San Diego	Anthropology	Located in Balboa Park, pre-Columbian history of the western Americas and Native American art and culture
National City Depot		National City	Railroad	Operated by the San Diego Electric Railway Association in a restored 1880s Santa Fe depot
Oceanside Historical Museum		Oceanside	Local history	website, operated by the Oceanside Historical Society
Oceanside Museum of Art		Oceanside	Art	website, contemporary art from Southern California
Olaf Wieghorst Museum and Western Heritage Center		El Cajon	Local History	https://wieghorstmuseum.org/ Celebrates heritage of the American West and features the historic home, art, gardens, and history of longtime local resident and Danish-American artist Olaf Wieghorst
Old Town San Diego State Historic Park		San Diego	Open air	Includes five original adobes and museums with exhibits including law enforcement, carriages and horse-drawn vehicles, a newspaper print shop, schoolhouse, general store, blacksmith shop
Pacific Southwest Railway Museum		Campo	Railroad	Includes 1916 railroad depot, historic railroad cars and steam and diesel locomotives on display, railroad equipment
Parsonage Museum		Lemon Grove	Historic house	website, operated by the Lemon Grove Historical Society, displays include the general store, fruit packing, period rooms
Poway Historical Society Museum		Poway	Local history	website, operated by the Poway Historical and Memorial Society
Rancho Buena Vista Adobe		Vista	Historic house	website, mid 19th-century adobe house, history of Rancho Buena Vista (Felipe)
Rancho Guajome Adobe		Vista	Historic house	Mid 19th century 20-room adobe house
Rancho Santa Maria de Los Peñasquitos		San Diego	Historic house	Located in Los Peñasquitos Canyon Preserve, historic 1823 adobe ranch home
Roynon Museum of Earth Science & Paleontology		Escondido	Science and natural history	website, established in 2000 to educate students, scouts, and the general public in paleontology and earth sciences
San Diego Air & Space Museum		San Diego	Aviation	Located in Balboa Park, aviation and space history
San Diego Archaeological Center		Escondido	Archaeology	website, archaeology of the San Diego region from 10,000 years ago to present day
San Diego Art Institute Museum of the Living Artist		San Diego	Art	Located in Balboa Park
San Diego Automotive Museum		San Diego	Transport	In Balboa Park
San Diego Children's Discovery Museum		Escondido	Children's	website
San Diego Chinese Historical Museum		San Diego	Ethnic	website, Chinese American experience and Chinese history, culture and art
San Diego Firehouse Museum		San Diego	Firefighting	website, firefighting memorabilia dating back 100 years, located in Little Italy
San Diego Hall of Champions Sports Museum		San Diego	Sports	Located in Balboa Park
San Diego History Center		San Diego	Local history	website, located in Balboa Park, operated by the San Diego Historical Society
San Diego Model Railroad Museum		San Diego	Railway	Indoor model railroad exhibits, located in Balboa Park
San Diego Museum of Art		San Diego	Art	Located in Balboa Park
San Diego Natural History Museum		San Diego	Natural history	Located in Balboa Park
San Diego Sheriff's Museum and Educational Center		San Diego	Law enforcement	website
San Dieguito Heritage Museum		Encinitas	Local history	Covers the history of the San Dieguto area
San Marcos Historical Museum		San Marcos	Local history	website, operated by the San Marcos Historical Society
San Pasqual Battlefield State Historic Park		Escondido	History	History of the 1846 Battle of San Pasqual, the bloodiest battle in California during the Mexican–American War
Santa Ysabel Asistencia		Santa Ysabel	History	19th century Spanish mission and church
Santee Historical Society Museum		Santee	Local history	Located in a historic former dairy barn
Stein Family Farm		National City	Historic house	website, also known as the National City Living History Farm Preserve
Stuart Collection		San Diego	Art	Part of University of California, San Diego
Timken Museum of Art		San Diego	Art	Located in Balboa Park, includes collection of European old master paintings, sculptures, and tapestries, American art and Russian icons
The New Children's Museum		San Diego	Children's Museum	Located in downtown San Diego, includes permanent and temporary interactive art installations for children and families.
University of California, San Diego Art Galleries		San Diego	Art	University Art Gallery, Visual Arts Gallery, Gallery@Calit2
USS Midway Museum		San Diego	Aviation	Aircraft carrier and restored aircraft
Valley Center History Museum		Valley Center	Local history	Operated by the Valley Center Historical Society
Veterans Museum and Memorial Center		San Diego	Military	Located in historic Balboa Park, San Diego and U.S. military history of the Armed Forces
Vista Historical Society Museum		Vista	Local history	website
Wells Fargo History Museum		San Diego	History	Located in Colorado House in Old Town San Diego State Historic Park, 1850s stage stop and telegraph office
Whaley House		San Diego	Historic house	Mid 19th century period house
WNDR Museum San Diego		San Diego	Art	Multi-sensory interactive art experience
Women's Museum of California		San Diego	Women's	website, formerly the Women's History Museum
WWII/Korea LVT Museum		Marine Corps Base Camp Pendleton	Military	Exhibits on Landing Vehicles Tracked (LVT)s from World War II and the Korean War

== Defunct museums ==
- Villa Montezuma, San Diego, Friends site, closed in 2006, late 19th-century Queen Anne mansion in Sherman Heights

== See also ==
- National Register of Historic Places listings in Imperial County, California
- National Register of Historic Places listings in San Diego County, California
