= Olivenhain Town Meeting Hall =

- U.S. National Register of Historic Places
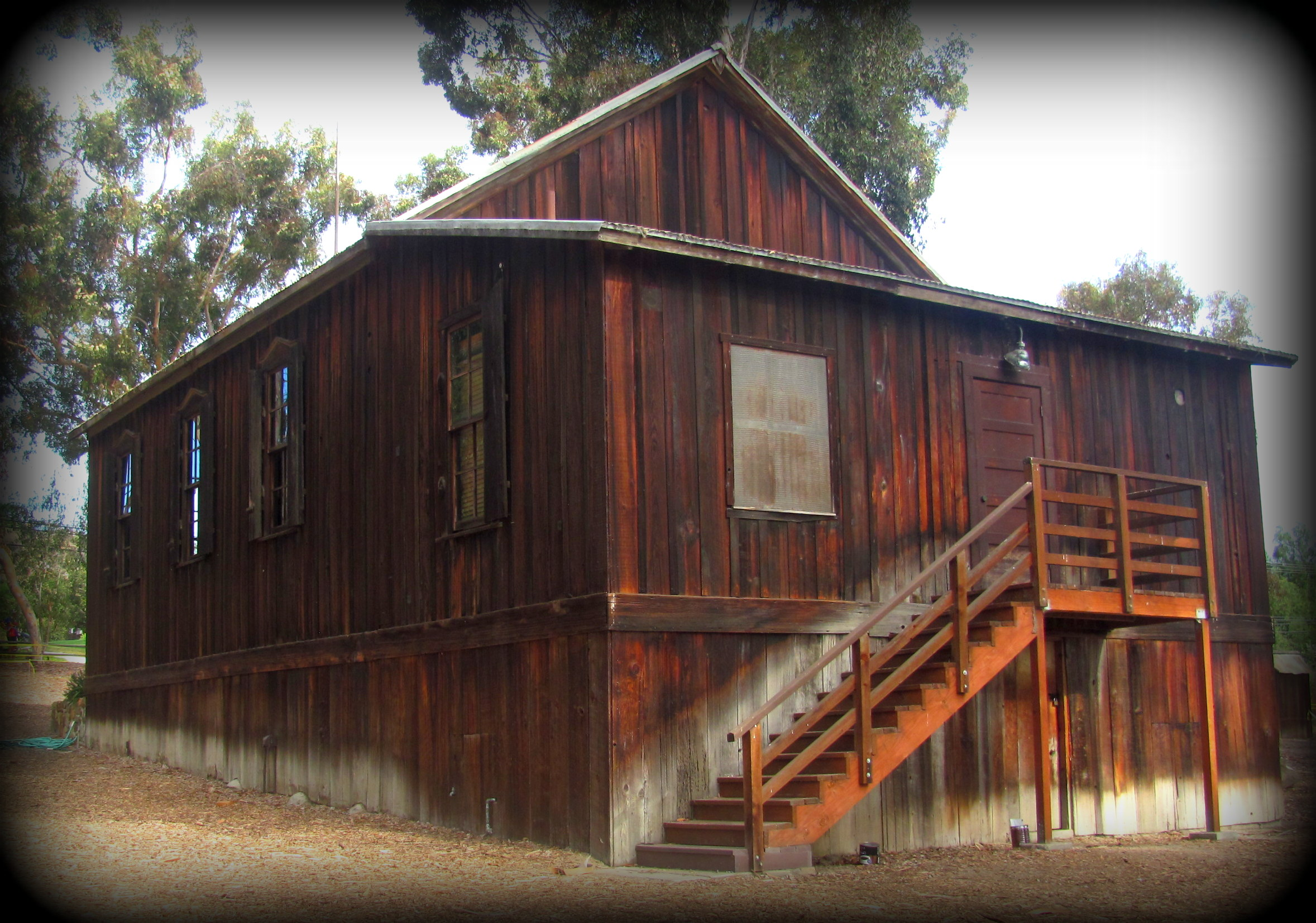

- Location within San Diego County, California Location within California Location within the United States
- Location: 423 Rancho Santa Fe Rd., Olivenhain, California
- Coordinates: 33°2′36″N 117°14′4″W
- Area: Less than one acre
- Built: 1894–95
- NRHP reference No.: 93001395
- Added to NRHP: December 17, 1993

The Olivenhain Town Meeting Hall is a community meeting house located at 423 Rancho Santa Fe Rd. in Olivenhain, California. The wood frame building was constructed from 1894 to 1895 by the settlers of Olivenhain. The residents of Olivenhain used the building for nearly all community functions, including political meetings, agricultural discussions, weddings, and community dances. Almost every important event in the community's history took place in the hall, and one author called the building "the nerve center of Olivenhain". An annex was added to the hall in 1916, using redwood from a second meeting hall which had fallen into disrepair.

The building was added to the National Register of Historic Places on December 17, 1993.
