= San Diego Athletic Club =

Historic building in San Diego

- U.S. National Register of Historic Places
- U.S. National Historic Landmark
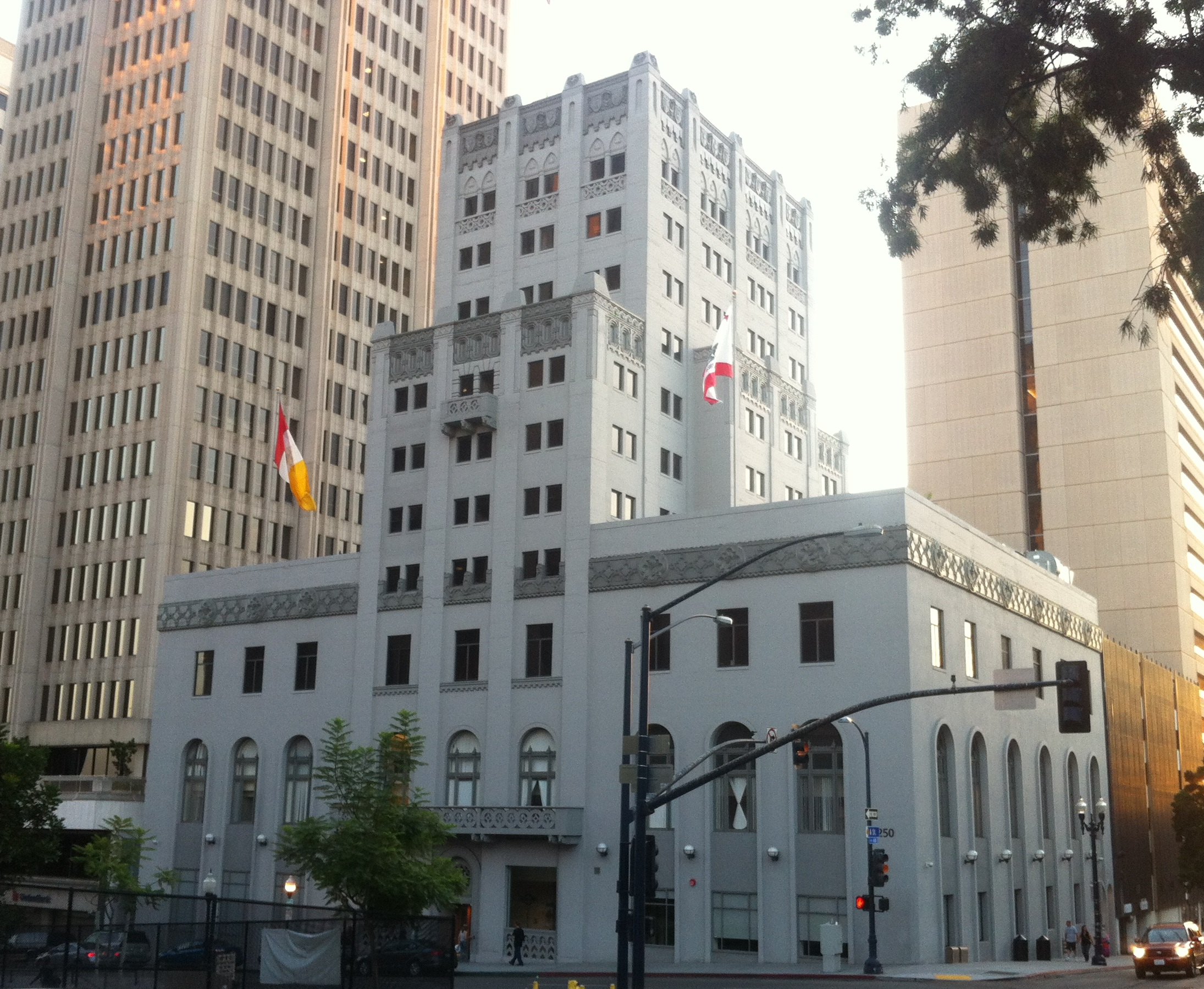
- View from A Street

- Location within San Diego County, California Location within southern California
- Location: 1250 Sixth Avenue, San Diego, California 92101
- Coordinates: 32.718516°N 117.159586°W
- Area: less than 1 acre (0.40 ha); Downtown San Diego
- Built: 1928
- Built by: Jarboe Construction Company
- Architect: Wheeler, William H.; Loveless, Ilton E. et al.
- Architectural style: Late Gothic Revival, Art Deco
- NRHP reference No.: 13000130

Significant dates
- Conversion to city center: 1994
- Added to NRHP: April 3, 2013

The San Diego Athletic Club (also known as the HBJ Building and the World Trade Center San Diego Building) is a historic building in downtown San Diego. It was built in 1928 as a private athletic club, was converted to office buildings in the 1960s, was converted to a city center in 1994, and became a homeless shelter and community medical facility in the 2010s.

== Building ==
In its initial 1928 press coverage, the building touted a 13-story structure made of reinforced concrete with 96 bedrooms, two solariums, four handball courts, a gymnasium, swimming pool, lounge, dining room, grill, a separate dining room and lounge for women, and a separate entrance on A Street for women. The construction cost was billed at US$850,000 (equivalent to $15,940,000 in 2025). However, later news articles reported the building as having 12 stories.

The ziggurat-shaped building includes stenciled ceiling frescoes in the former dining room and a grand staircase that was restored in the latest remodel. Within the building are figures of Paris and Helen of Troy by sculptor Katherine June Stafford that will be restored or reconstructed.

== History ==
In 1924, Colonel Ed Fletcher initiated the foundation of a club and put forth the money to begin its charter. Other members of letters of incorporation include George Marston, Claus Spreckels, Milton A. McRae, Ralph E. Jenney, with Colonel Fletcher presiding as the club's first president. During its inaugural week, there were invitations for dinner-dances and an open house for members and invited guests, drawing more than 10,000 people to the new club.

Beginning with the Great Depression, the renamed San Diego Club ran into financial trouble. In the 1940s, the club's debts created doubt if it would continue, but it persevered into the 1960s.

In the mid-1960s the building was converted to offices for Harcourt Brace Jovanovich after the club folded. After HBJ vacated the building, they donated the property to the city in the fall of 1993. In 1994 the City of San Diego and the Port of San Diego made arrangements with the World Trade Centers Association to establish a San Diego center located in the Athletic Club building, with the former two entities helping to bear the cost. The plan to convert the building into commercial properties was projected to generate nearly half a million dollars per year in revenue for the city. The city also moved some of its own staff, including a portion of the Parks and Recreation Department into the property.

In 2010, the City of San Diego made public its proposed plans to use the San Diego Athletic Club building to provide housing for a portion of its homeless population. The plans called for support and services for up to 225 homeless residents. It also proposed selling the property for up to $10 million to the housing development agency or another government entity to run the program.

In 2012, it was reported that Turner Construction Company spent $24 million to restore the building to its original state and make way for its use as a homeless shelter. The organization managing the project is Affirmed Housing, which paid the city $4 million for the property and arranged financing for the remainder. In addition to housing homeless residents, the center will provide a medical health clinic and a social services center.

== See also ==
- National Register of Historic Places listings in San Diego County, California
