= Save Our Heritage Organisation =

Landmark preservation organization based in California

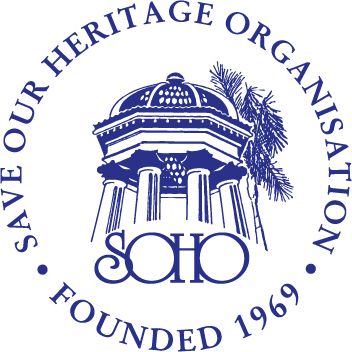
- Founded: San Diego, California (1969)
- Type: Non-profit
- Location: Offices in San Diego, CA
- Services: Preservation and maintenance of historic architecture
- Fields: Protecting historic landmarks
- Website: sohosandiego.org

Save Our Heritage Organisation (SOHO) is a non-profit organization devoted to the preservation of the historic architecture and landmarks around the San Diego, California, area. Founded in 1969, Save Our Heritage Organisation maintains several historic buildings including the George W. Marston House. They are directly partnered with the National Trust for Historic Preservation.

The organization's mission statement is: "Through education, advocacy, and stewardship SOHO's mission is to preserve, promote and support preservation of the architectural, cultural and historical links and landmarks that contribute to the community identity, depth and character of our region."

== History ==
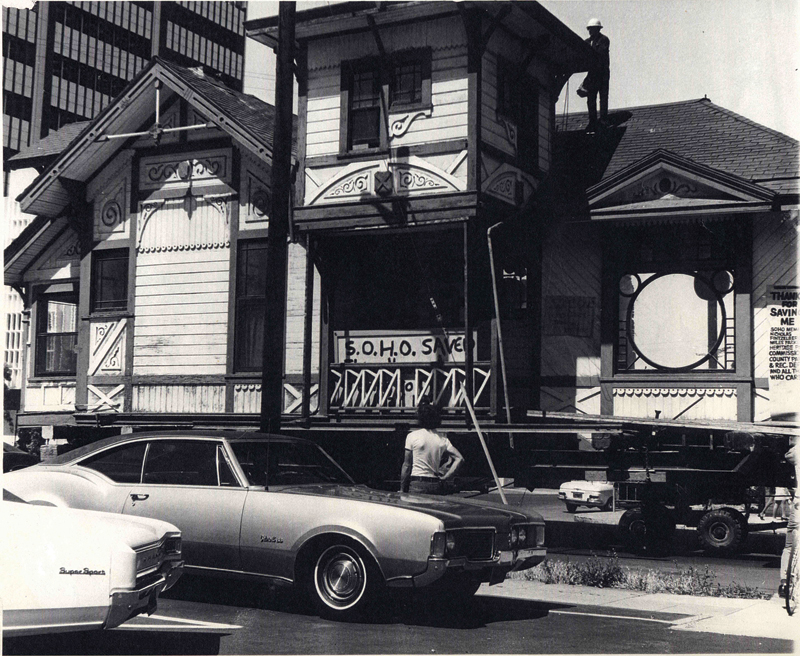
Sherman-Gilbert House ([c] sohosandiego.org)

The organization was founded in 1969 in San Diego, California, by Robert Miles Parker. He and 35 other members the organization wrote its constitution in April of the founding year. The constitution states that, "The general purpose for which this corporation is formed is to purchase, own, move, improve, maintain, repair, display, lease and/or operate, as museums or otherwise, various homes, stores, buildings, and other structures exemplifying different types of architectural styles found in the San Diego area for the education and benefit of the public."

The first project the organization undertook was the restoration and relocation of the Sherman-Gilbert house, a Stick-Eastlake Victorian that was set to be demolished. The house was eventually relocated to the Old Town San Diego State Historic Park area.

In 1970, Save Our Heritage Organisation's Preservation Council was created. This council was instated to notify the organisation of any demolitions or sales of historic buildings going on in the San Diego area. Around the same time, Save Our Heritage Organisation worked with the Historical Site Board, the A.I.A (American Institution of Architects) and the San Diego Historical Society to purchase and restore Villa Montezuma.

In 2009, Save Our Heritage Organisation celebrated its 40th anniversary. This milestone was marked by an award winning hour-long documentary titled Four Decades of Historic Preservation in San Diego County, by San Diego film maker and photographer Dan Soderberg. The film received a California Governor's Award for Historic Preservation. Also in 2009, they added the Marston House, a 1905 Arts and Crafts movement home, to their list of museums.

== Projects ==
- The Sherman-Gilbert House, a Stick-Eastlake Victorian house saved from demolition and relocated to Heritage Park in Old Town San Diego
- Santa Fe Depot, a historic train depot saved from demolition
- The Harfield Timberland Christian House, a Queen Anne Victorian house relocated to Heritage Park in Old Town San Diego State Historic Park
- San Diego Rowing Club building, restored
- Villa Montezuma, restored
- The Burton House, a Classic Revival Victorian house relocated to Heritage Park in Old Town San Diego State Historic Park
- The Bushyhead House, an Italianate Victorian house relocated to Heritage Park in Old Town San Diego State Historic Park
- Granger Music Hall, restored
- Horton Plaza, restored

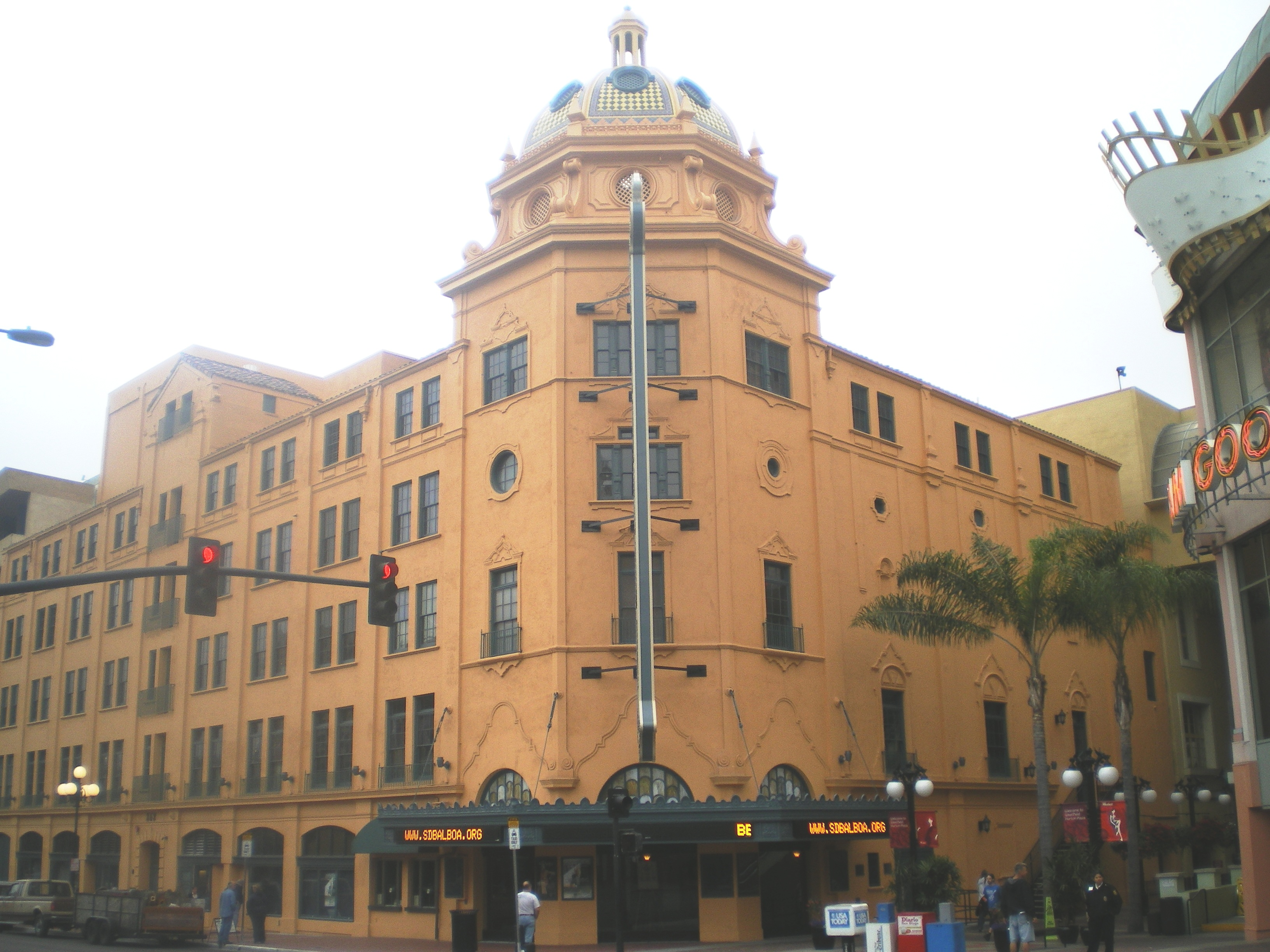
Balboa Theatre

- Senlis Cottage, a 19th-century vernacular Victorian house relocated to Heritage Park in Old Town San Diego
- Cliff House, helped by Save Our Heritage Organisation's Preservation Easement Program**
- The Sherman-Judson residence, helped by Save Our Heritage Organisation's Preservation Easement Program**
- The Wisteria Cottage, once John Cole's Bookstore, helped by Save Our Heritage Organisation's Preservation Easement Program**
- The Senator Hotel, helped by Save Our Heritage Organisation's Preservation Easement Program**
- The Callan Hotel, helped by Save Our Heritage Organisation's Preservation Easement Program**
- The Brunswig Drug Company, helped by Save Our Heritage Organisation's Preservation Easement Program**
- The Mission Brewery, helped by Save Our Heritage Organisation's Preservation Easement Program**
- Greg Rogers House, a house in Chula Vista, California, saved from demolition and restored
- Percival Thompson House, restored
- Green Dragon Colony, restored
- Julia Liffreing House, restored
- Balboa Theatre, restored
- Egyptian Revival Buildings, helped receive historic designation

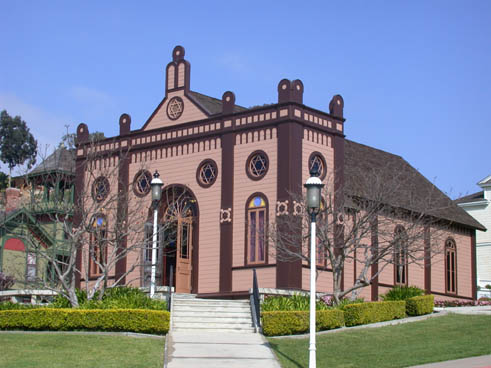
Temple Beth Israel

- Temple Beth Israel, saved from demolition, currently located in Heritage Park
- Warner Ranch, saved from deterioration
- San Diego Veterans war Building, saved
- Canfield-Wright House, saved from demolition
- Western Metal Supply Building, a building in downtown San Diego saved by Save Our Heritage Organisation
- Simon Levi Building, a building in downtown San Diego saved by Save Our Heritage Organisation
- Levi Wholesale Grocery Co., saved
- Showley Bros Candy Company, a building in downtown San Diego saved by Save Our Heritage Organisation
- Schiefer & Sons Aeroplane Co., a building in downtown San Diego saved by Save Our Heritage Organisation
- Station A, a San Diego powerhouse saved by Save Our Heritage Organisation
- Carnation Building, a building in downtown San Diego saved by Save Our Heritage Organisation
- Rosario Hall, a building in downtown San Diego saved and relocated
- Kidd & Krone Auto Parts Building, a building in downtown San Diego saved by Save Our Heritage Organisation
- TR Produce Building, a building in downtown San Diego saved by Save Our Heritage Organisation
- Art Deco Fire Station Building, a building in downtown San Diego saved by Save Our Heritage Organisation
- Bledsoe Company Furniture Warehouse, a building in downtown San Diego saved by Save Our Heritage Organisation
- Western Wholesale Drug Company Warehouse, a building in downtown San Diego saved by Save Our Heritage Organisation
  - The Preservation Easement Program provides protection for historical sites façade

== Museums and other buildings ==
Save Our Heritage Organisation maintains multiple museums and historic buildings including:

- The George and Anna Marston House Museum and Carriage House, an Arts & Crafts movement building built in 1905
- The Warner-Carrillo Ranch House, California's first regular overland stage connection with St. Louis built in 1857.

== Other activities ==
The group, for purposes of public education, has frequently created or sponsored historic home tours, lectures, and workshops. SOHO operates gift/book stores in two locations. The organization assembles an annual Most Endangered List, a local take on the National Trust's Eleven Most Endangered List. The group publishes a bimonthly e-newsletter and has a book publishing wing "Our Heritage Press". SOHO regularly acts as an adviser to smaller neighborhood advocacy groups.
