= A. H. Beach House =

- A.H. Beach House
- U.S. National Register of Historic Places
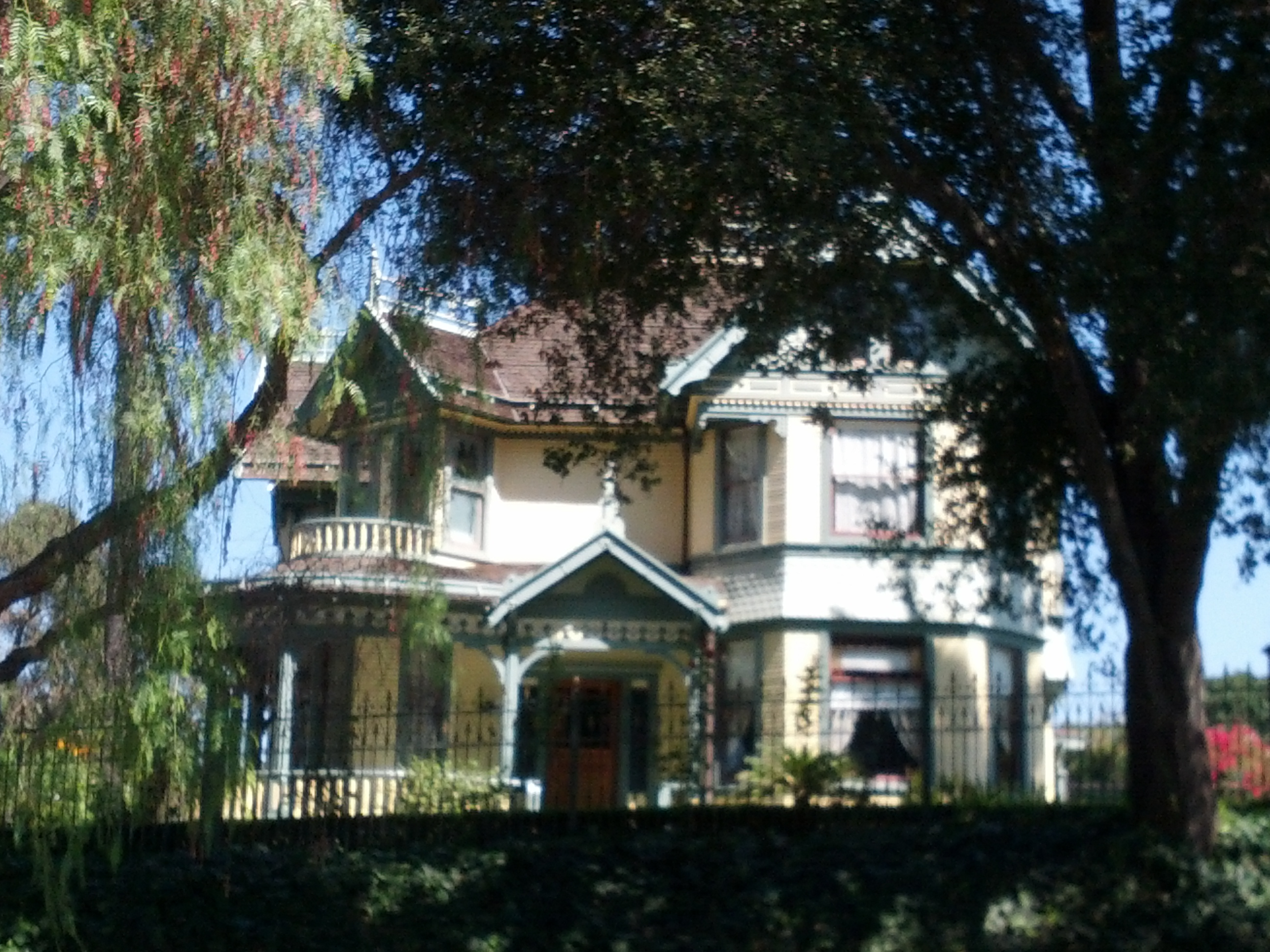

- Location within San Diego County, California Location within California Location within the United States
- Location: 700 South Juniper, Escondido, California 92025
- Coordinates: 33°7′4″N 117°4′25″W
- Built: 1896
- Architectural style: Queen Anne Victorian
- NRHP reference No.: 93001462
- Added to NRHP: December 30, 1993

The A. H. Beach House, also known as the Bergman House, is an historic Queen Anne style mansion, considered late American Queen Anne style, in Escondido in San Diego County, California. The house was listed on the National Register of Historic Places (NRHP) in San Diego County on December 30, 1993.

== History ==
The corner lot, in the Stanley Heights Addition, was owned by the Escondido Land and Town Company before being purchased by A. H. Beach in 1887. The house, built in Queen Anne style architecture, was finished in 1896. Beach did not live there long and the house was purchased by Henry W. Putnam in 1900. Putnam was a businessman, inventor, and manufacturer. He invented a fence wire barbing machine, and improvements, Putnam was from Bennington, Vermont.

Putnam retired to San Diego in 1905 and William Jereslaw lived at the residence with his nieces Suzette and Miriam Kuhn from 1905 until 1909. From 1909 until 1914 Appleton Shaw and Amelia Timken Bridges lived in the mansion. Amelia was the daughter of Henry and Fredericka Timken. Henry was the founder of Timken Roller Bearing Company. W. H. Baldridge, pharmacist and drugstore owner, was a resident of Escondido since 1887. W.H. and his wife Fannie bought the house in 1914 and lived there until 1917. Matthew and Martha Cassou owned the estate from 1917 until 1945. Bernard and Irene Cesmat bought the residence in 1945 and lived there until selling it to Virgil and Natalie Bergman in 1968. The Bergman's restored the home with some modern updates.

=== Recent history ===
Art dealer and collector Harry Parashis and his wife, Letitia, bought the home in 1997, and spent several years bringing it to its "original Victorian ornate grandeur.". In 2016 the house and property sold for $1,200,000.00.

== Architecture ==
The NRHP lists the house as Late Victorian as a sub of Queen Anne. It is a 2 1/2-story multi-gable house with a wood-and-shingle roof and fish scale siding,
