= Bumann Ranch =

Historic ranch in California

- U.S. National Register of Historic Places
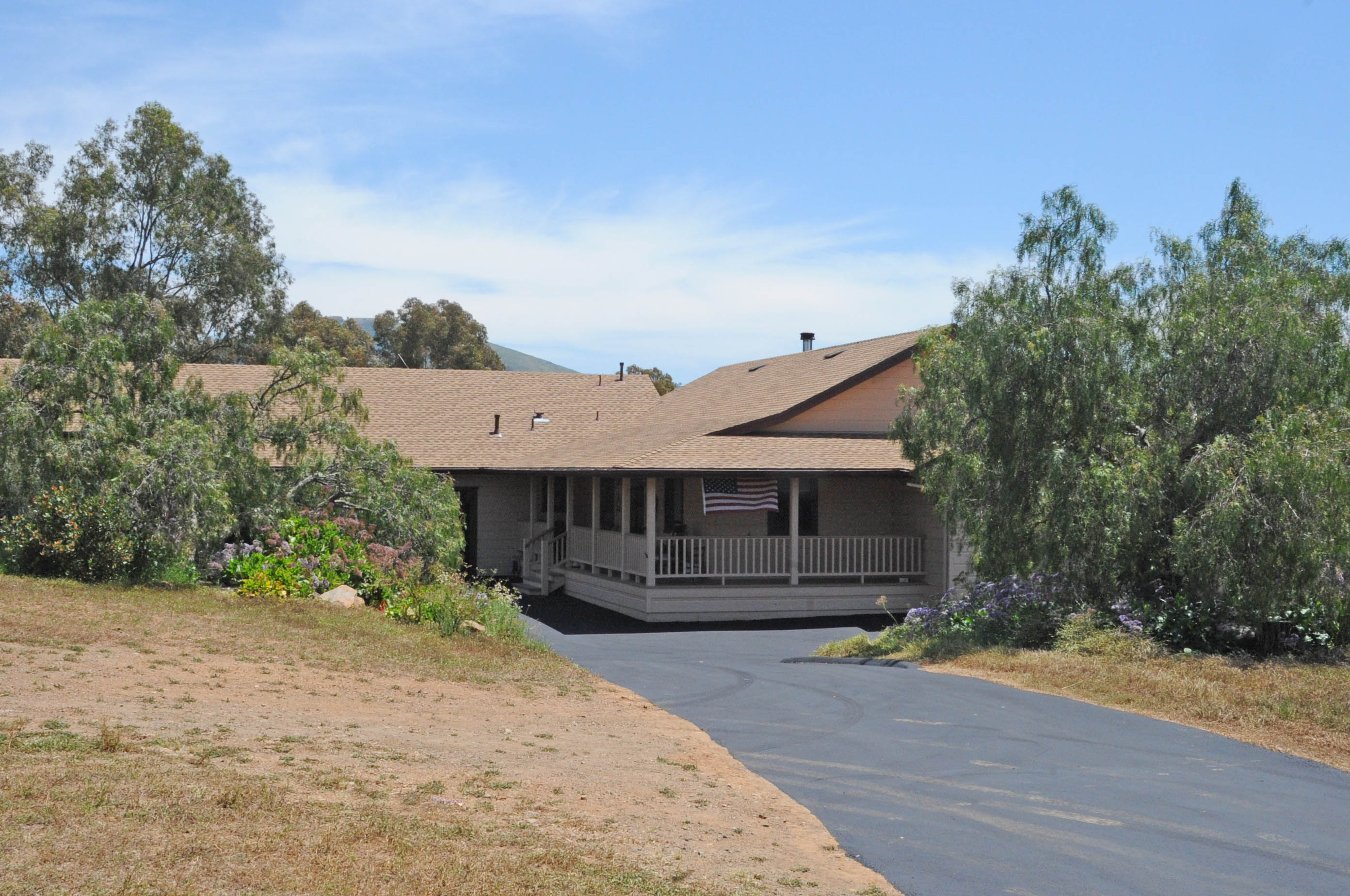
- The Bumann's private modern-day home in 2020; behind it is the ranch

- Location within California
- Location: Encinitas, California
- Coordinates: 33.061476°N 117.202435°W
- Area: 10 acres (4.0 hectares)
- Built: 1886-1926
- Built by: Herman Freidrich Bumman
- NRHP reference No.: 100004937
- Added to NRHP: March 6, 2020

Bumann Ranch is a ranch in Encinitas, California. Previously owned by German colonists, it was added to the National Register of Historic Places on March 6, 2020. Currently, the ranch contains twenty buildings on its 10 acres of land.

== History ==
Herman Freidrich Bumann immigrated with his father from Germany to America in 1884, at age 21. Following his uncle who had moved to Denver, Colorado, twelve years before, he was one of the first German colonists in Southern California, being part of a group that bought Rancho Las Encinitas. When the duo arrived in California, they took shelter at what is now Stagecoach Community Park in Carlsbad.

In 1885, Herman purchased 5 acres (2.0 hectares) near Escondido Creek. During a financial crisis, Herman also purchased a homestead for $50 (equivalent to $1,792 in 2025). Continuing to acquire land, Herman owned 480 acres (190 ha) by his death in 1926. He had twelve children with Emma Marie Junker. His seventh child, Herman Charles, was the sole maintainer of the farm by the 1930s.

The ranch is currently owned by Herman Charles' nephew, Richard Bumann and his wife, Adelina "Twink" Bumann. Although the ranch was added to the NRHP in March 2020, the official plaque was not installed until July 2022.

== Features ==
The Bumann family residence is a one-bedroom house, at 10 ft (3.0 m) by 12 ft (3.7 m). Today, the house is a museum of sorts, as Herman's seventh child, Herman Charles, had a preference for collecting photographs and composing music for his violin. A picture of H. Charles playing with Bing Crosby in a pickup group can be seen on a wall.
