= Medico-Dental Building =

- U.S. National Register of Historic Places
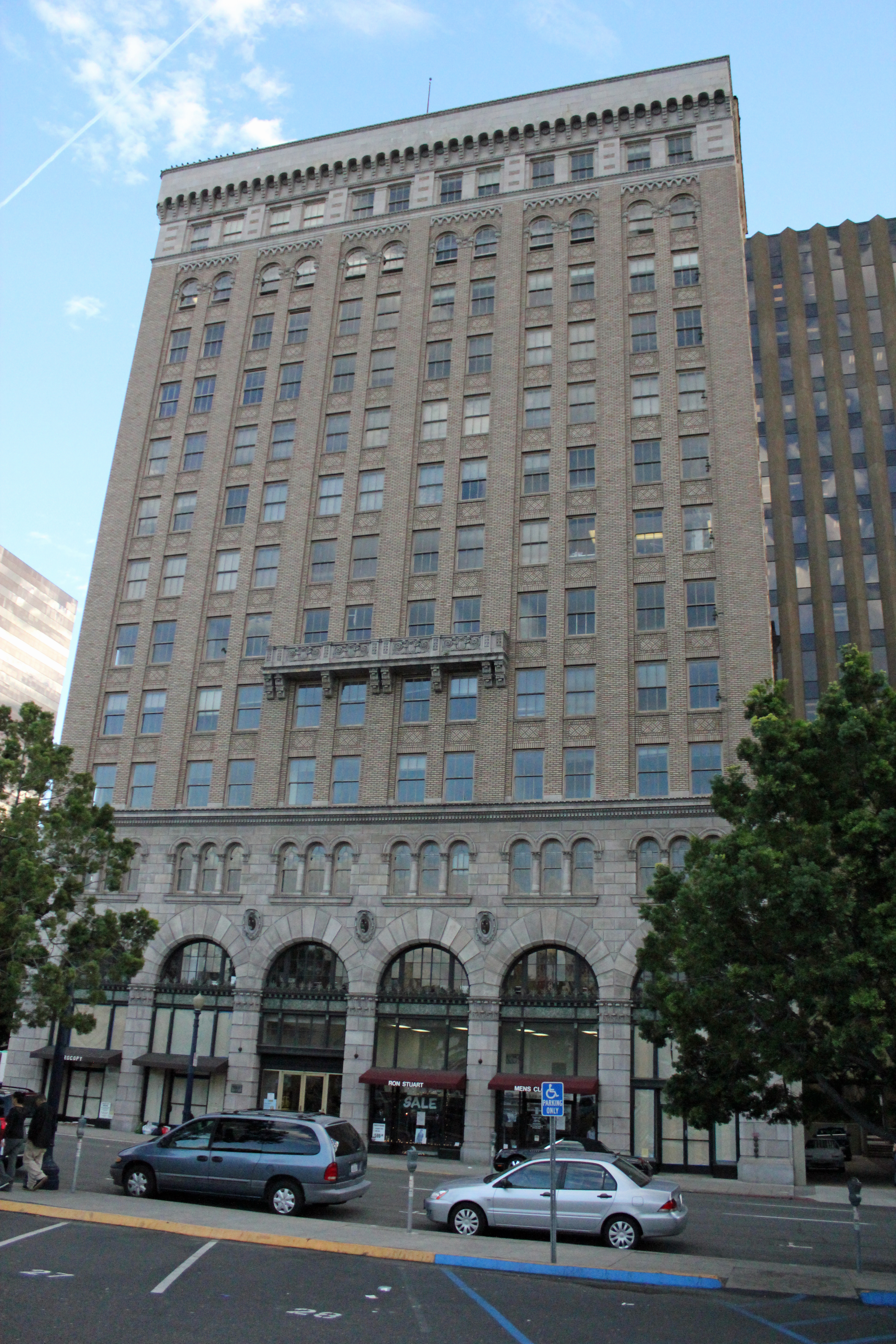
- The building as seen from A Street

- Location within San Diego Location within San Diego County, California Location within California Location within the United States
- Location: 233 A St., San Diego, California
- Coordinates: 32.7187°N 117.1622°W
- Area: 0.2 acres (0.081 ha)
- Built: 1927
- Architect: Stevenson, Frank W.
- NRHP reference No.: 79000524
- Added to NRHP: September 4, 1979

The Medico-Dental Building, now known as the Centre City Building, is a historic 14-story high-rise office building in downtown San Diego, California. It was one of San Diego's first skyscrapers; when it opened in 1927 it was the tallest building in the city. It is San Diego Historical Site # 135 and was added to the National Register of Historic Places in 1979.

== History ==
The 0.23-acre (930 m^{2}) location, 233 A Street on the southwest corner of 3rd Avenue and A Street, was originally the site of a second home and carriage house for Alonzo Horton, the father of Downtown San Diego. The Sisters of St. Joseph purchased the property from Horton in the 1880s and established a girls' school, the Academy of Our Lady of Peace, in the large home, using the carriage house as a convent and offices. The Academy moved to its current location, a larger property in Normal Heights, in 1925. The Horton structures were then razed to build the Medico-Dental Building, which opened in 1927.

As its name suggests, the building was designed to house medical and dental offices, with a ground-floor pharmacy and a medical library on the 14th floor. Its purpose was to cluster medical and dental services in one place, improving San Diego's medical scene as well as providing a profitable business venture; a similar business model had succeeded in a dozen cities across the country. The original owners were a group of professional men headed by Charles Lineaweaver. Tenancy was restricted to licensed physicians and dentists; the rule was enforced by a Board of Directors and Officers.

As time went on the focus of San Diego's medical community shifted uptown toward Hillcrest, where Mercy Hospital and the UCSD Hospital were located. The building was no longer restricted to doctors and dentists but was used more and more for general office tenants, including at various times government offices, the public defender's office, and the San Diego Chamber of Commerce. During the 1980s the name was changed to the Centre City Building.

== Description ==
The building is 14 stories high with a foundation that encloses a concrete subterranean basement. It has a reinforced concrete frame structure, also known as "ductile frame" construction. The exterior walls are concrete clad, faced with granite on the lowest three stories and with brick on the remainder of the building. It is built in an "L" configuration, with the two wings fronting A Street and 3rd Avenue. Its design is neoclassical revival with a decorative facade of brick, quarried granite, and ornamental cast iron trim. It has a gabled rooftop finished with Spanish tile, a gravel-covered lower observation roof over a rolled mineral surface, and rosette-style windows. Interior features include a marble lobby floor and staircase with a restored coffered ceiling.

It has 88,000 square feet (8,200 m^{2}) of office space and 7,000 square feet (650 m^{2}) of ground floor retail space. The building is owned by

== Recognition ==
The building and its architect, Frank W. Stevenson, received the 1933 A.I.A. award in the Commercial/Industrial category.
