= University Heights Water Storage and Pumping Station Historic District =

Historic district in California, United States

Coordinates: 32.75366°N 117.13455°W

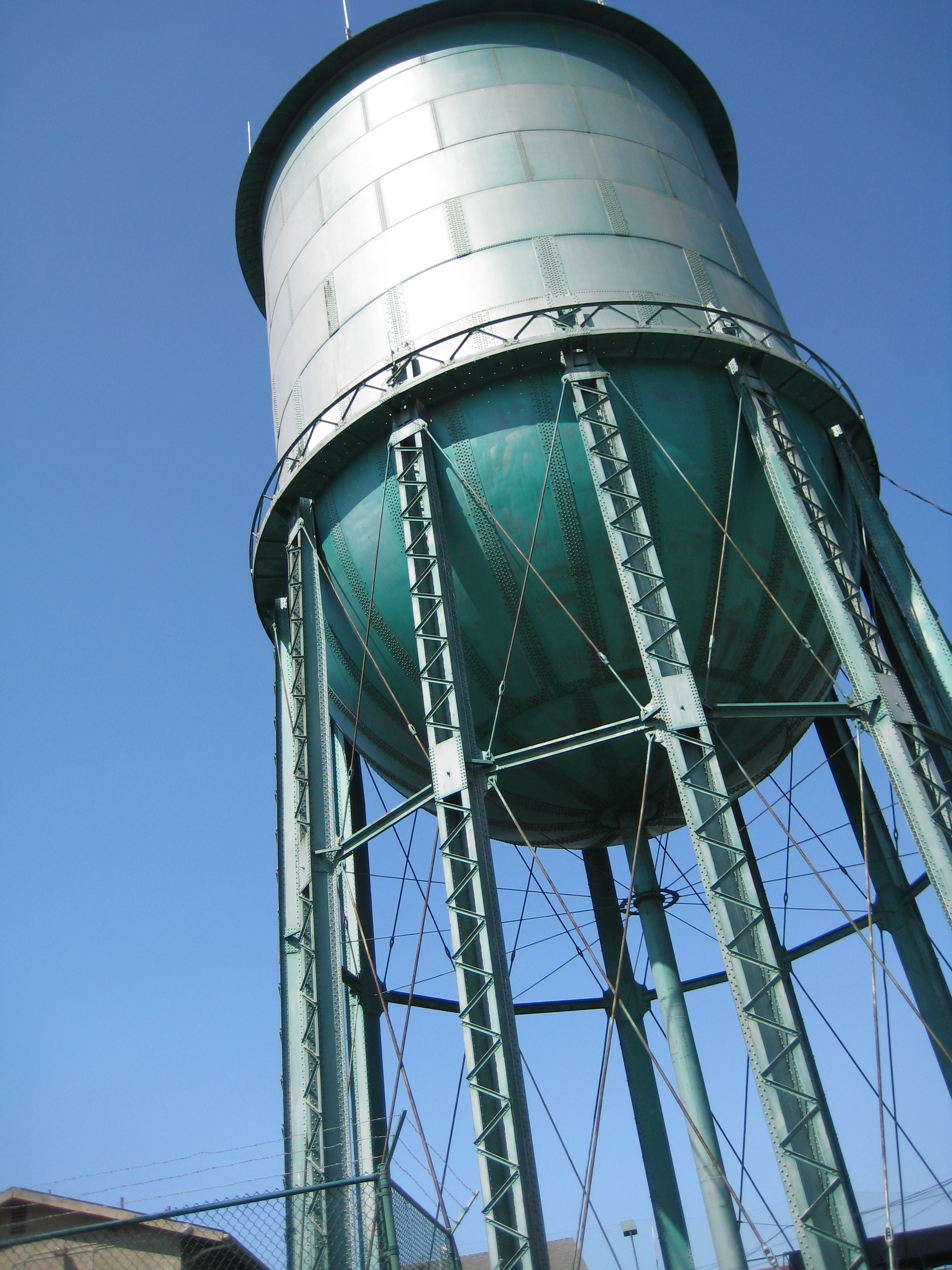
North Park Water Tower, San Diego

The University Heights Water Storage and Pumping Station Historic District is in the University Heights neighborhood of the City of San Diego, California. The historic district includes the North Park Water Tower, located at the intersection of Idaho Street and Howard Avenue in central San Diego.

The water tower was listed on the National Register of Historic Places in 2013 and was designated as a Local Historic Civil Engineering Landmark in 2015.

== See also ==
- National Register of Historic Places listings in San Diego, California
- National Register of Historic Places listings in San Diego County, California
- Historic districts in California
