= Rancho Las Encinitas =

Mexican land grant in present-day California

Coordinates: 33.070°N 117.240°W

Rancho Las Encinitas was a 4,434-acre (17.94 km^{2}) Mexican land grant in present-day San Diego County, California, given in 1842 by Governor Juan Alvarado to Andrés Ybarra. The grant was named “Los Encinitos” which means " little oaks", but was later misspelled as “Las Encinitas”. The grant extended along the Pacific coast north from San Elijo Lagoon to Batiquitos Lagoon, and encompassed present-day Leucadia, Encinitas, Cardiff-by-the-Sea and Olivenhain, California.

== History ==
Andrés Ybarra (1788–) lived in Los Angeles in 1819. He took part in the revolt against Manuel Victoria in 1831, and in 1836 was juez de campo at San Diego. Prior to receiving the one square league Rancho Las Encinitas in 1842 he owned a store in San Diego. Ybarra constructed an adobe house on the northeast corner of his rancho where he and his wife, Francisca Juana Moreno (1790–1883), lived for 18 years.

With the cession of California to the United States following the Mexican-American War, the 1848 Treaty of Guadalupe Hidalgo provided that the land grants would be honored. As required by the Land Act of 1851, a claim for Rancho Las Encinitas was filed with the Public Land Commission in 1852, and the grant was patented to Andrés Ybarra in 1871.

Ybarra sold the Rancho Las Encinitas in 1860 to San Diego merchants, Joseph S. Mannasse and Marcus Schiller. Mannasse and Schiller converted the adobe ranch house into a stage coach station. Mannasse and Schiller ran into financial difficulties and lost the rancho to foreclosure. The rancho was then sold in 1880 to the brothers, Frank and Warren Kimball, who at the time owned Rancho de la Nación. The Kimball brothers hoped to resell the rancho to an immigrant colony, and in 1884 it was purchased by Theodore Pinther and Conrad Stroebel for a German colony that would be named Olivenhain (meaning "olive grove" in German).

== Historic sites of the Rancho ==
- Stagecoach Community Park features the brick remnants of the Andrés Ybarra adobe and former stagecoach stop. The site is protected by a gated enclosure.

== See also ==
- Ranchos of California
- List of Ranchos of California
