= George W. Marston House =

Historic house in California, United States

- U.S. National Register of Historic Places
- San Diego Historic Landmark
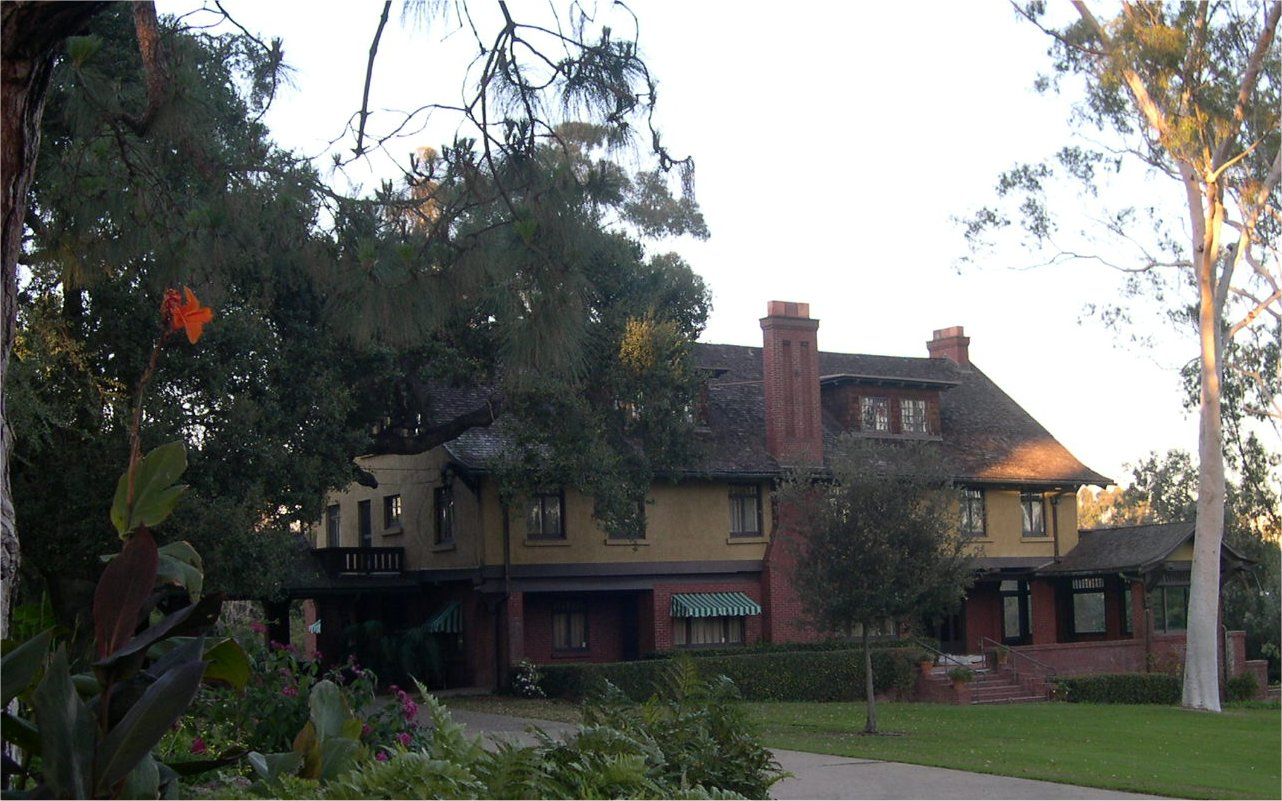
- George Marston House

- Location within San Diego Location within San Diego County, California Location within California Location within the United States
- Location: 3525 7th Avenue; San Diego, California
- Coordinates: 32°44′30″N 117°9′28″W
- Area: 4.6 acres (1.9 ha)
- Built: 1904
- Architect: Irving John Gill
- NRHP reference No.: 74000552
- SDHL No.: 40

Significant dates
- Added to NRHP: December 16, 1974
- Designated SDHL: December 4, 1970

The George W. Marston House (or George Marston House and Gardens, also referred to as the George and Anna Marston House or the Marston House) is a museum and historic landmark in Balboa Park in San Diego, California. It is maintained by Save Our Heritage Organisation (SOHO).

== House ==
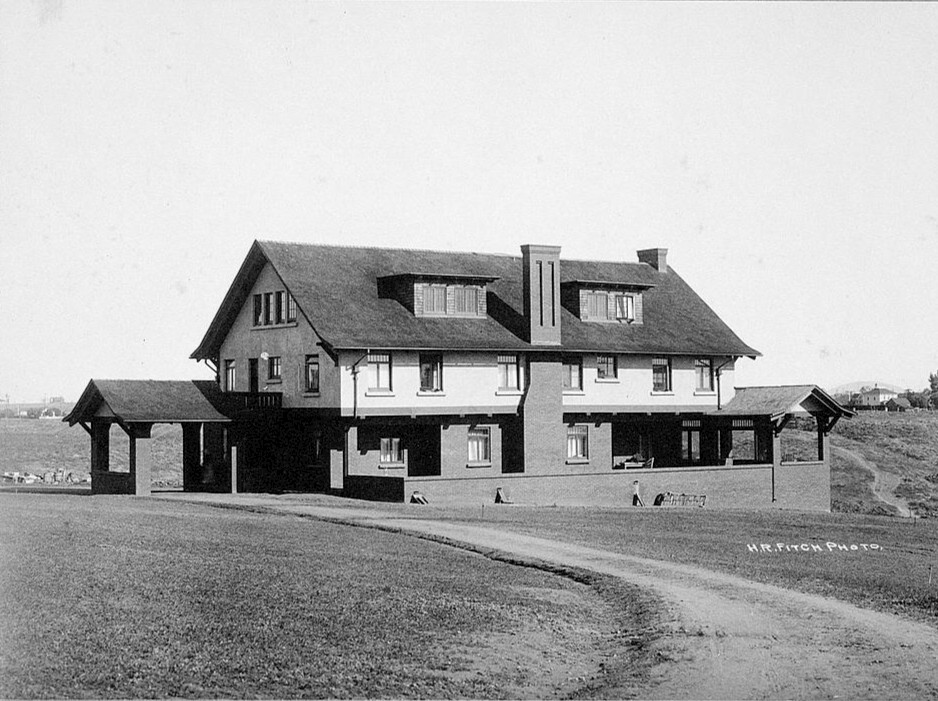
George Marston House (1905)

The George W. Marston House is located in Balboa Park in San Diego, California. The home spans 8,500 square feet (790 m^{2}) and is surrounded by five acres of lawns and gardens. Completed in 1905, the house is considered a prime example of architecture from the Arts and Crafts Movement. Home to George White Marston (1850–1946) and his wife, Anna Gunn Marston (1853–1940), the three-story house and gardens were a lively family home, where two of the five Marston children were married and the eldest lived out her life. The house was designed and built by renowned architects William Sterling Hebbard and Irving Gill. Inside the house, the rooms are furnished with a variety of different pieces designed by renowned Gustav Stickley, L. & J.G. Stickley, and Charles Limbert. Other notable furnishings are the Gill, Mead & Requa furniture and the plein air art exhibit featuring paintings by artists Alfred Mitchell, Maurice Braun and Charles Fries. Many of the family's original items are still on display at the museum.

According to the Marston House general release, "the family lived on two floors plus an attic. On the first floor, redwood-paneled rooms unfold off a wide hallway, which narrows to include a bench built into the staircase. The living room and adjoining oak-paneled dining room open onto the south terrace and overlook the lawn and canyon. Including the second floor’s north wing, the house has six bedrooms, a sleeping porch and four baths."

The Marston House was converted into a museum in 1987 after the Marston family gave the house to the City of San Diego. It is currently maintained by Save Our Heritage Organisation (SOHO), which runs the museum and the shop located in the carriage house on the property.

== Gardens ==
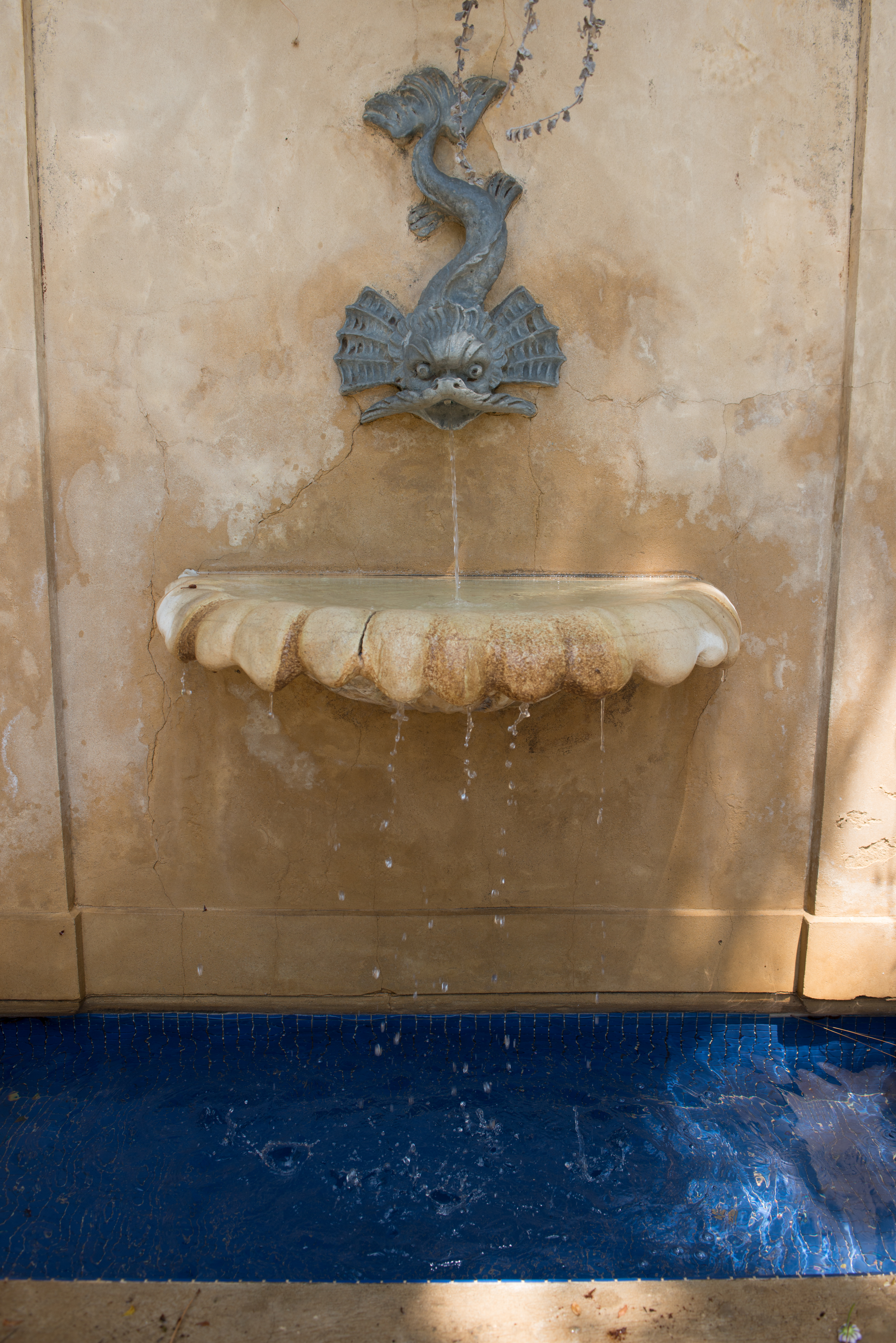
Fountain in the Marston House gardens

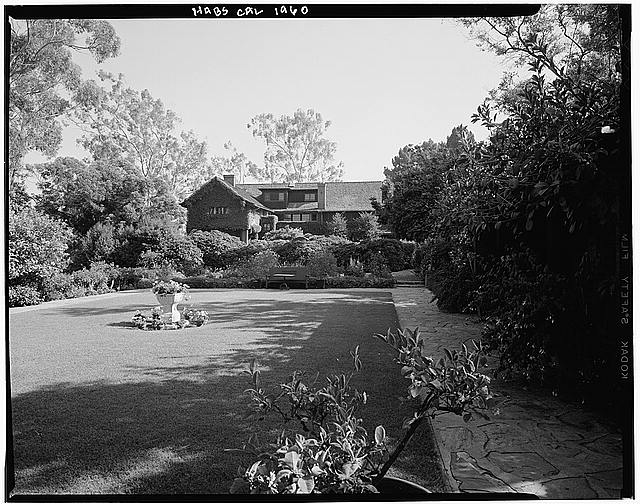
George Marston House (circa 1960)

The Marston house gardens were initially designed in 1905 by landscape gardener George Cooke. The house and gardens were upgraded during the late 1920s. Hale Walker, from the landscape architectural firm of John Nolen Cambridge, Massachusetts, redesigned the grounds and in particular the rear formal garden which coincided with the Marstons’ 50th wedding anniversary. The garden spans over 5 acres with lush exotic and native trees, shrubs, vines and flowers. The Marston's also acquired plants and landscaping ideas from their friend noted pioneer horticulturist Kate O. Sessions, as well as local San Diego nurserymen. Some of the plants found in the garden at its prime and still extant today are: Pinus canariensis Canary Island Pines, Eucalyptus, and Quercus agrifolia California Oaks, Ceanothus leucodermis, wild lilacs, Solandra guttata Mexican Cup of Gold vines and Queen Elizabeth roses, daughter Mary Marston's favorite. Many of the original plants survive and Save Our Heritage Organisation is restoring other features of the garden as well. The geranium, a flower considered to represent the legacy of George Marson and the Marston House, also makes an appearance in the garden. (During Marston's two unsuccessful campaigns for mayor of San Diego, the difference between him and his pro-growth opponent was characterized as "smokestacks vs. geraniums".)

== George Marston ==
George Marston was a department store owner and a prominent civic leader in San Diego. He was a founder of the San Diego Historical Society (now the San Diego History Center). He may be best known for preserving the site of the San Diego Presidio, the first European settlement in present-day California, which had fallen into ruins. He bought the site in 1907, built a private historical park in 1925, and donated it to the city in 1929. Presidio Park is now listed on the National Register of Historic Places.

He owned the Marston department store, created after he split the store business with his partner Hamilton; Hamilton taking the grocery side of the firm and Marston taking the dry goods departments. The Marston Company became the only major department store in San Diego, and was located downtown. Its success was due to exclusive business arrangements Marston made with several suppliers. He became quite wealthy and was a generous philanthropist in the city. He later opened a store in Mission Valley called "Marcie's" named after his daughter. The Marston department store, at 5th Avenue and C Street, was owned by the family until they sold it in 1961 to The Broadway Stores. It has since closed.

== See also ==
- George Marston
- Save Our Heritage Organisation
- George P. Marston House, owned by his father
