= Encinitas Boathouses =

Boat-shaped houses in California

S.S. Encinitas and S.S. Moonlight
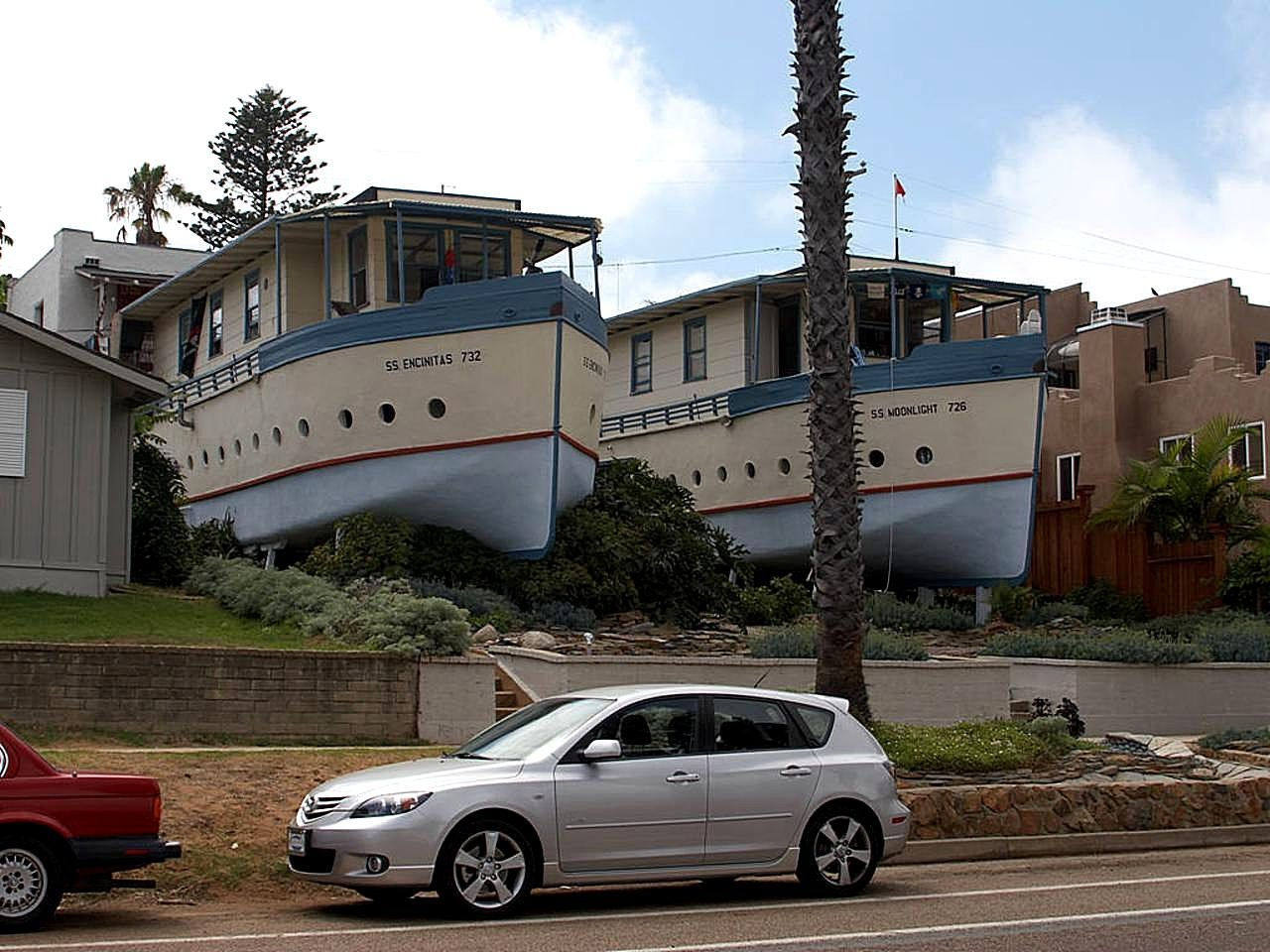
- Interactive map of the S.S. Encinitas and S.S. Moonlight area

General information
- Status: Completed
- Location: 726-32 3rd St, Encinitas, California 92024
- Year built: 1929
- Completed: 1929
- Owner: Encinitas Preservation Association

Height
- Height: 15 ft (4.6 m)

Design and construction
- Architect: Miles Minor Kellogg
- Encinitas Boathouses
- U.S. National Register of Historic Places
- Location within California
- Nearest city: Encinitas, California
- Coordinates: 33.04294°N 117.29541°W
- Area: 1,100 sq ft (100 m^{2})
- NRHP reference No.: 100004530
- Added to NRHP: October 21, 2019

S.S. Encinitas and S.S. Moonlight, designated by the National Register of Historic Places as the Encinitas Boathouses, are two houses made to look like a boat in Encinitas, California. Despite their appearance, they have never been to sea and are purely novelty architecture. The dwellings were added to the register on October 21, 2019. North Coast Current claims that they are the most photographed buildings in the city.

== History ==
The boats were constructed by Miles Minor Kellogg in 1929, salvaging wood from the closed-down Moonlight Beach Dance Parlor and Encinitas Hotel. The dance parlor had closed due to the Prohibition. Kellogg was a maritime engineer from Benton Harbor, Michigan, whose father was a sea captain. Inspired by the city's ocean setting, and without any plans, he also built the four-unit apartment complex behind the boats.

The houses are currently owned by the Encinitas Preservation Association, which purchased it in 2008. It plans to convert it into a museum once it pays off its loan, as the boathouses are currently being rented as private residences. The association had to pay $1.55 million (equivalent to $2,317,813 in 2025) to purchase the buildings and the apartments behind it.

== Architecture and interior ==
Both houses are 15 ft (4.6 m) tall and 20 ft (6.1 m) long, with an area of about 1,100 sq ft (100 m^{2}). Each also has 19 portholes, a galley, a steering wheel, a chart desk, and rudders. The bow also can be used as a patio. Each boat has two floors.
