= Canfield–Wright House =

Historic house in California, United States

- U.S. National Register of Historic Places
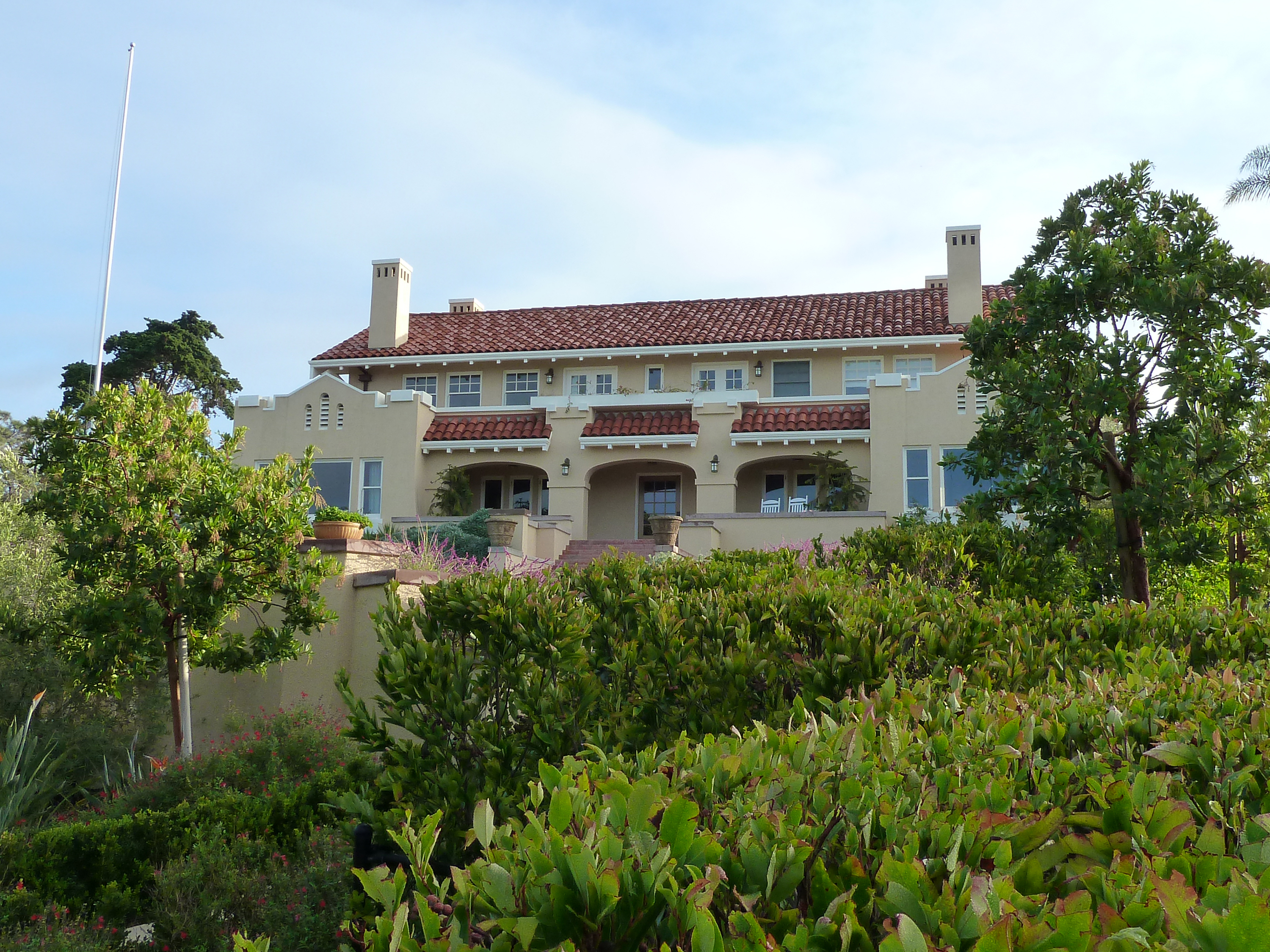

- Location within San Diego County, California Location within California Location within the United States
- Location: 420 Avenida Primavera, Del Mar, California
- Coordinates: 32°57′44.6″N 117°15′46.1″W
- Area: Less than one acre
- Built: 1910
- Architect: Austin, John C.
- Architectural style: Mission/Spanish Revival
- NRHP reference No.: 02001747
- Added to NRHP: May 14, 2004

The Canfield–Wright House, known alternatively as Wrightland and The Pink Lady, is a historic structure in Del Mar, California. The private home was placed on the National Register of Historic Places (NRHP) on May 14, 2004.

The house was built in 1910 for Charles A. Canfield. Canfield, alongside business partner Edward L. Doheny, became an oil tycoon after drilling the first successful oil well in Los Angeles in 1892. The two would go on to also drill the first oil well in Mexico, using the resulting asphalt to pave Mexican roads and standing as a precursor to Pemex. The partners' work became part of the basis of Upton Sinclair's Oil! and related film There Will Be Blood. Canfield convinced the Atchison, Topeka and Santa Fe Railway to switch from coal to oil-burning locomotives. He ultimately invested his wealth in real estate. Forming the Rodeo Land and Water Company in Los Angeles with Burton E. Green and Max Whittier and the South Coast Land Company in Del Mar with Henry E. Huntington and other partners, he helped establish both Beverly Hills, California, and Del Mar.

Intending the house as a second home, Canfield chose architect John C. Austin, who would also design the Southern Land Company's Hotel Del Mar and go on to design major Southern California landmarks such as Los Angeles City Hall and the Griffith Observatory. The house was designed in the Mission and Spanish Revival styles with influences of an Italian villa and sited with a view of the Pacific Ocean.

Canfield died in 1913. The house stayed in the Canfield family until 1923, when it was sold to the Wright family. The structure was only minimally altered: small additions were made to the main residence and outbuildings, and a large retaining wall was added to the property. By the end of the twentieth century, the structure was being rented and had been painted a bright pink. In 2002, a developer requested permission to treat the property as a teardown to replace it with a contemporary structure. The proposal galvanized local residents to try to preserve the structure; their actions included filing a nomination for the building to be placed on the NRHP. Helped by groups such as the Save Our Heritage Organisation, citizens pressured the City of Del Mar, which previously had no preservation ordinances or incentives for preservation, in city council and design review board meetings, delaying the permit. Within six months of the house's being threatened with demolition, a new owner stepped forward to purchase the property and restore it. The new owner, a developer who lived nearby, presented development plans that were judged to be in compliance with historic-preservation guidelines. The home was restored over a four-year period from 2004 to 2008. It remains a private residence, currently owned by Marc and Patty Brutten.
