= Heritage Park (San Diego) =

Coordinates: 32.7538°N 117.1929°W

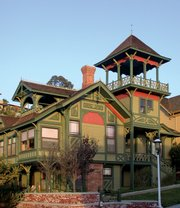
Sherman Gilbert House

Heritage County Park is a county park in San Diego County, California, located near Old Town San Diego State Historic Park and measuring almost eight acres. It was developed to preserve examples of San Diego's historic Victorian architecture including Italianate, Stick-Eastlake, Queen Anne and Classic Revival styles. The properties were all relocated from their original locations with the help of San Diego County and Save Our Heritage Organisation.

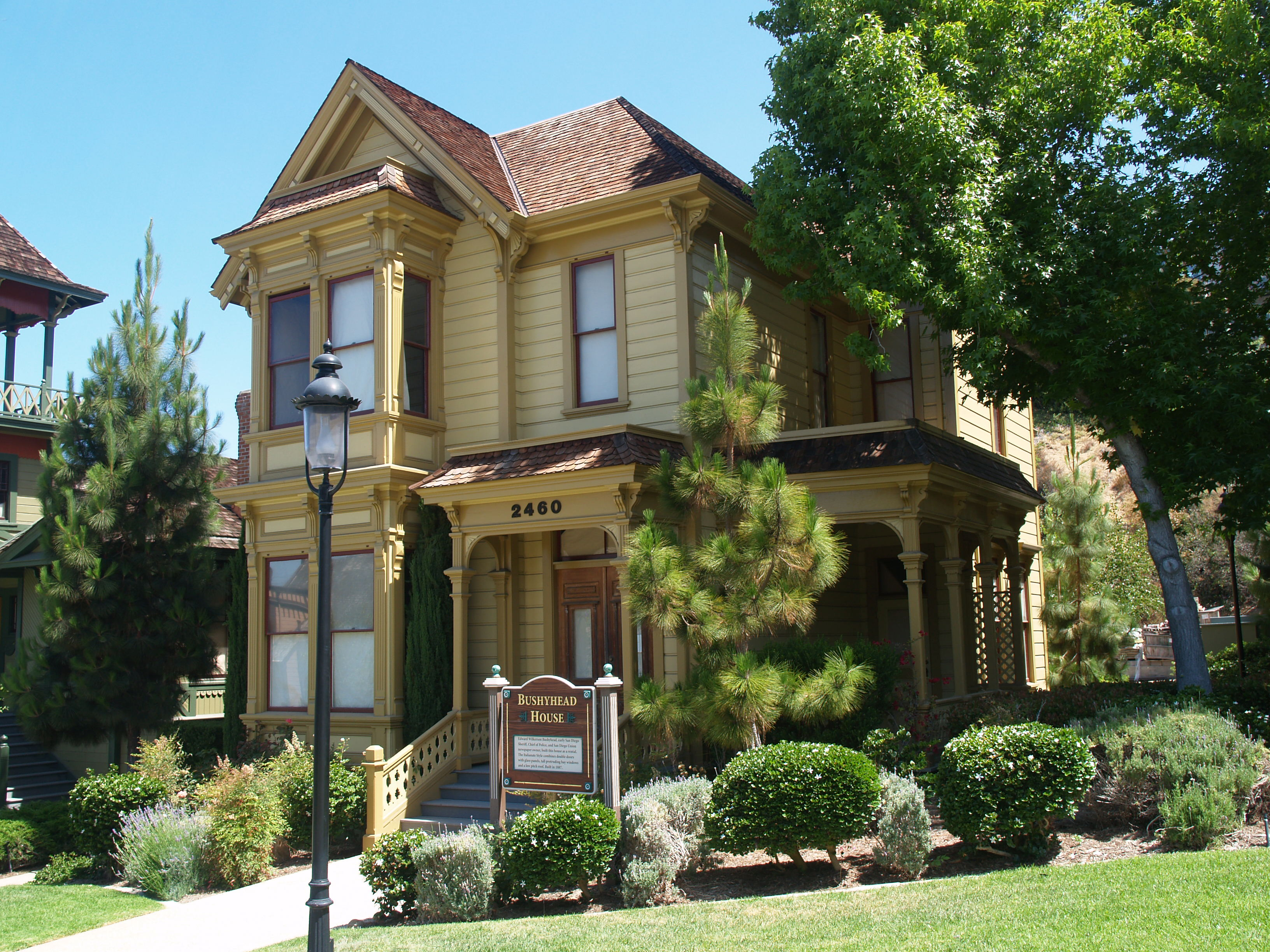
Bushyhead House

== Victorian homes in the park ==
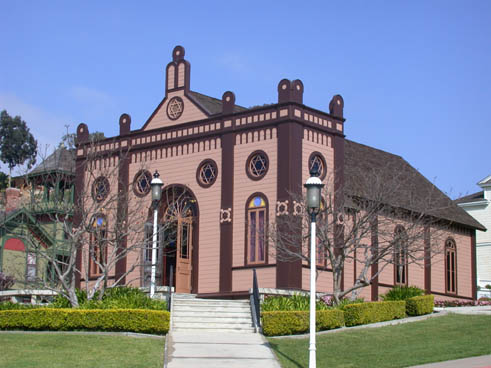
Temple Beth Israel

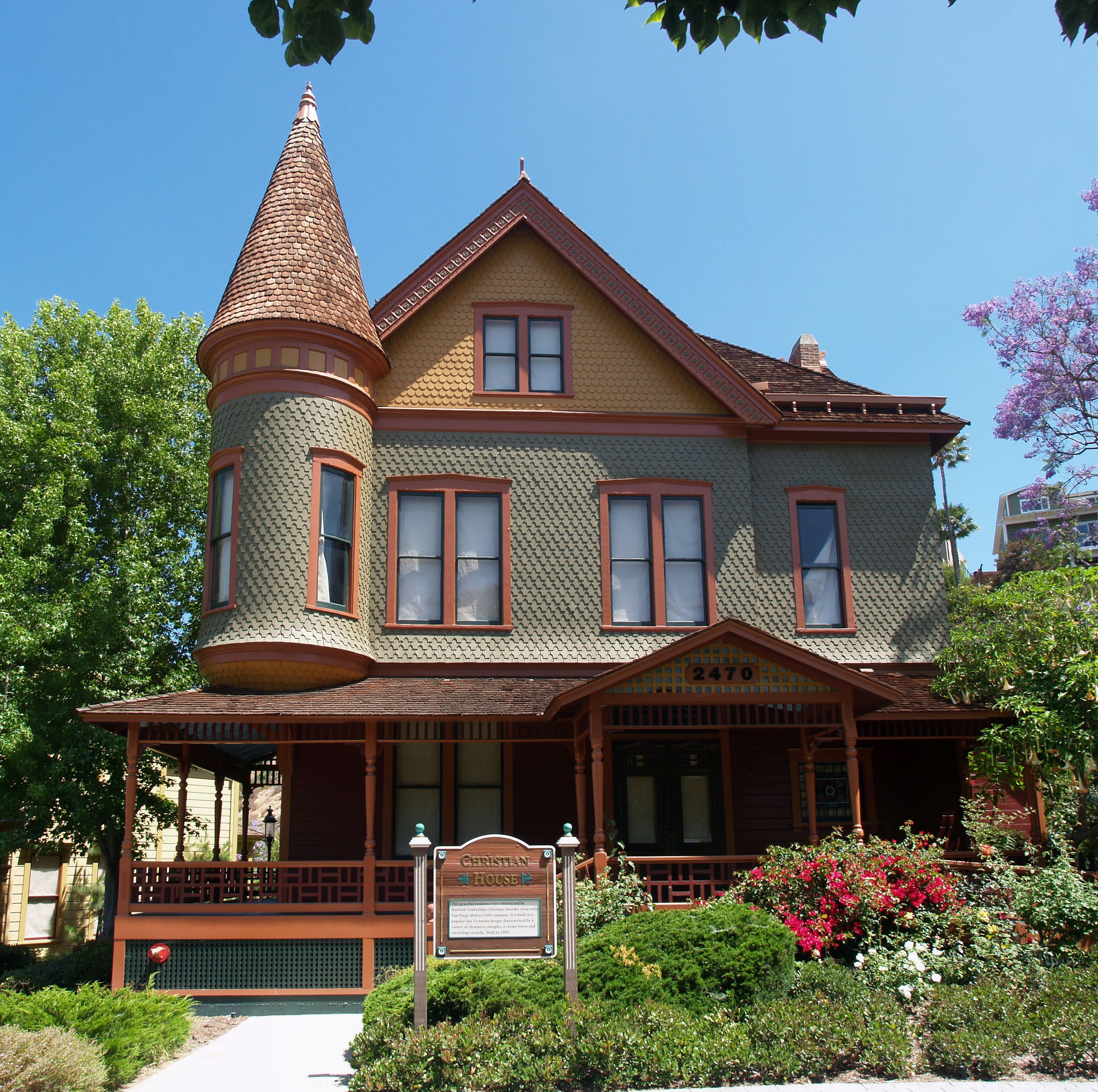
Christian House

- Senlis Cottage - Built in 1896, this 19th-century vernacular-style cottage was built for Eugene Senlis, an employee of San Diego horticulturist Kate Sessions. It is a historic house museum of a late 19th-century working class cottage, and is open daily for viewing.
- Sherman-Gilbert House - John Sherman, cousin of General William Tecumseh Sherman, hired architects Nelson Comstock and Carl Trotsche to build this Stick-Eastlake–style home in 1887. Many internationally famous entertainers were brought to receptions in this house; Anna Pavlova danced in the music room and Artur Rubinstein played piano here. The Sherman-Gilbert House was also the first house Save Our Heritage Organisation restored and relocated to Heritage Park.
- Bushyhead House- Edward Wilkerson Bushyhead, an early San Diego sheriff, chief of police and San Diego Union newspaper owner, built this Italianate residence in 1887.
- Christian House - This Queen Anne–style house was built in 1889 by Harfield Christian, founder of an early San Diego abstract company.
- McConaughy House - This Stick-Eastlake was constructed in 1887. The original owner founded the first scheduled passenger and freight service in San Diego.
- Burton House - A classic revival home built in 1893.

== Historic synagogue ==
- Temple Beth Israel - The first sanctuary of the Congregation Beth Israel, Temple Beth Israel was completed in 1889 at 2nd and Beech Streets in downtown San Diego. This classic revival building was used by many religious sects before it was relocated to Heritage Park. It also contains two reed/pump organs in its choir loft, which are playable; an Estey and a Western Cottage. It is open for viewing.

== See also ==
- Save Our Heritage Organisation
- Old Town San Diego State Historic Park
