= Thomas House (Escondido, California) =

- U.S. National Register of Historic Places
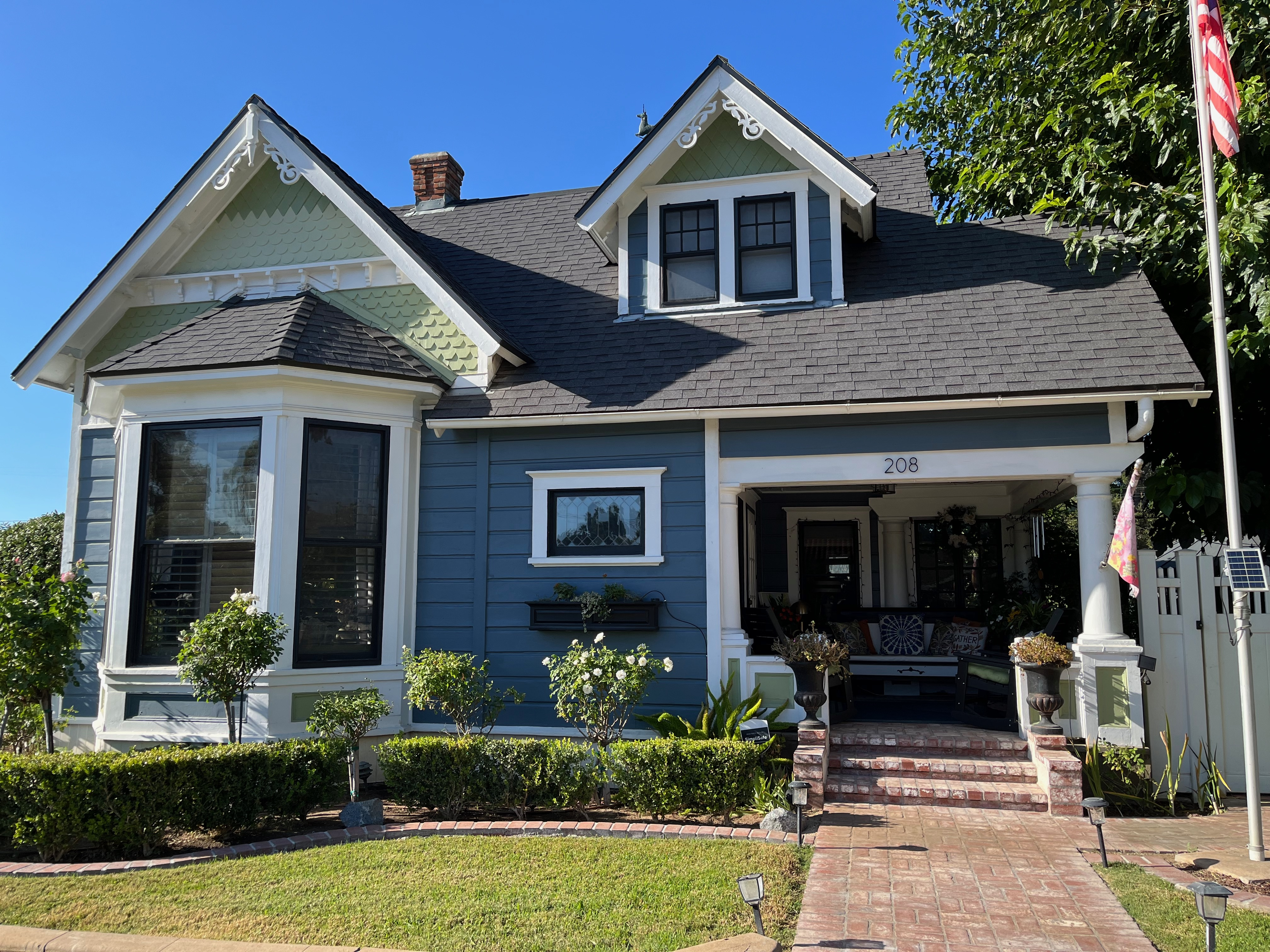

- Location within California Location within the United States
- Location: 208 E. Fifth Ave., Escondido, California
- Coordinates: 33°7′8″N 117°4′36″W
- Area: less than one acre
- Architectural style: Queen Anne, Queen Anne Cottage
- NRHP reference No.: 92001684
- Added to NRHP: December 30, 1992

Thomas House in Escondido, California, also known as Turrentine House, was added to the National Register of Historic Places in 1992.
