= Encinitas Historical Society Schoolhouse =

Restored schoolhouse in California

1883 Schoolhouse
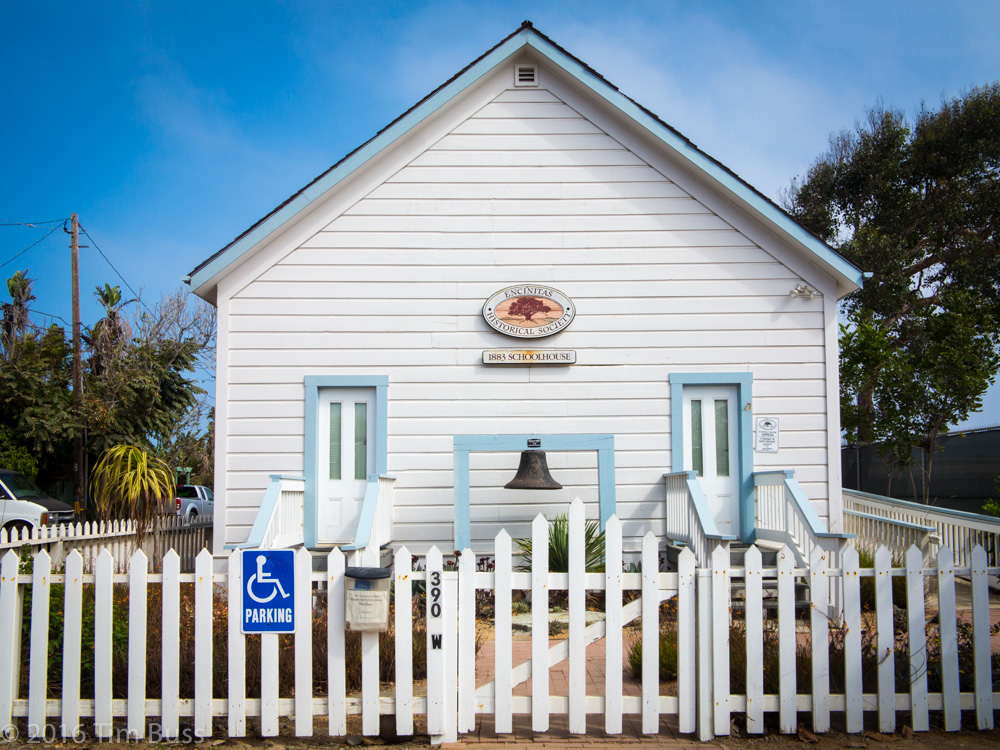
- The schoolhouse in 2016
- Interactive map of the 1883 Schoolhouse area

General information
- Status: Restored
- Location: 390 W F St, Encinitas, CA 92024
- Coordinates: 33.04399°N 117.29628°W
- Year built: 1883
- Cost: $600 (equivalent to $20,732 in 2025)
- Owner: Encinitas Historical Society

Design and construction
- Architects: Edward G. Hammond; Ted Hammond

Website
- encinitashistoricalsociety.org

The 1883 Schoolhouse is a restored one-room school in Encinitas, California. The oldest building in the city, it was built in 1883 to house the town's eight schoolchildren. The building currently functions as a museum.

== Architecture and interior ==
The building is primarily made from redwood. Its wood floors are the same as from when they were originally constructed. The walls of the interior have old photographs which depict the history of Encinitas and the schoolhouse.

== History ==
The arrival of an English couple, Edward and Jane Hammond, and their seven children to the small town of Encinitas boosted its population to 22. Founded in 1842, it still did not have a school, but Edward G. Hammond, a cabinetmaker, and his 17-year-old son Ted were paid $600 to construct a schoolhouse up to the eighth grade.

The school was originally successful, but it eventually fell into a state of neglect as other, larger schools, started propping up in the town. It was relocated in 1928 and became a private residence for over fifty years. However, as real estate prices started rising in the 1980s, the building was set to be demolished. In spite of this, the Encinitas Historical Society, which had recently formed, was able to save it from destruction in 1983 while relocating and restoring it. The schoolhouse was reopened to the public in 1995.

== Encinitas Historical Society ==
The society is a non-profit organization that aims to assist in "preserving and interpreting the City’s rich past though [sic] its research, library, programs, exhibits and publications." Its current president is Carolyn Cope and one of its members, Pam Hammond Walker, is the great-granddaughter of Edward Hammond, the builder of the schoolhouse.
