= Olivenhain, Encinitas, California =

Neighborhood in Encinitas, California, United States

Olivenhain
- Neighborhood of Encinitas
- Location within the state of California
- Coordinates: 33°02′46″N 117°14′05″W
- Country: United States
- State: California
- County: San Diego
- City: Encinitas
- Time zone: UTC-8 (Pacific (PST))
  - Summer (DST): UTC-7 (PDT)
- ZIP codes: 92024
- Area code: 760

Olivenhain is a neighborhood in the city of Encinitas, California, located in the North County area of San Diego County. It is the easternmost community of Encinitas, bordering the western portion of Rancho Santa Fe.

The community of Olivenhain is primarily single family custom homes with relatively large lots. Minimum lot sizes range from 0.5 acres (2,000 m^{2}) to 5 acres (20,000 m^{2}). The topography tends to be rolling, and most streets are small and wind through the hills. Olivenhain has a vast network of recreational trails, used by pedestrians and equestrians. A common sight in the area during late afternoons and dusk are hot air balloons. Olivenhain has a darker sky than coastal San Diego towns due to its "Dark Sky Policy" which restricts lights from street lights, tennis courts, and other forms of light pollution.

== History ==
The area is located on the Rancho Las Encinitas Mexican land grant, and was settled by a German colony in the 1890s. The name Olivenhain is from German and means "olive grove". The German settlers built the meeting hall which still stands. It is used today for community functions such as the annual Oktoberfest, Haunted House, summer movie series, craft fairs and a variety of civic group meetings. Residents of Olivenhain may schedule the Meeting Hall and grounds for private functions; it is a popular wedding site.

Originally an unincorporated community, in 1986 Olivenhain joined with the nearby communities of Leucadia, Cardiff-by-the-Sea, and Encinitas to form the incorporated city of Encinitas.

== Education ==
Olivenhain is located within the Encinitas Union School District and the San Dieguito Union High School District. Elementary students attend Olivenhain Pioneer Elementary, then Diegueño Middle School. Public High School students attend La Costa Canyon High School or San Dieguito Academy. There also are several private schools nearby.

== Photos ==
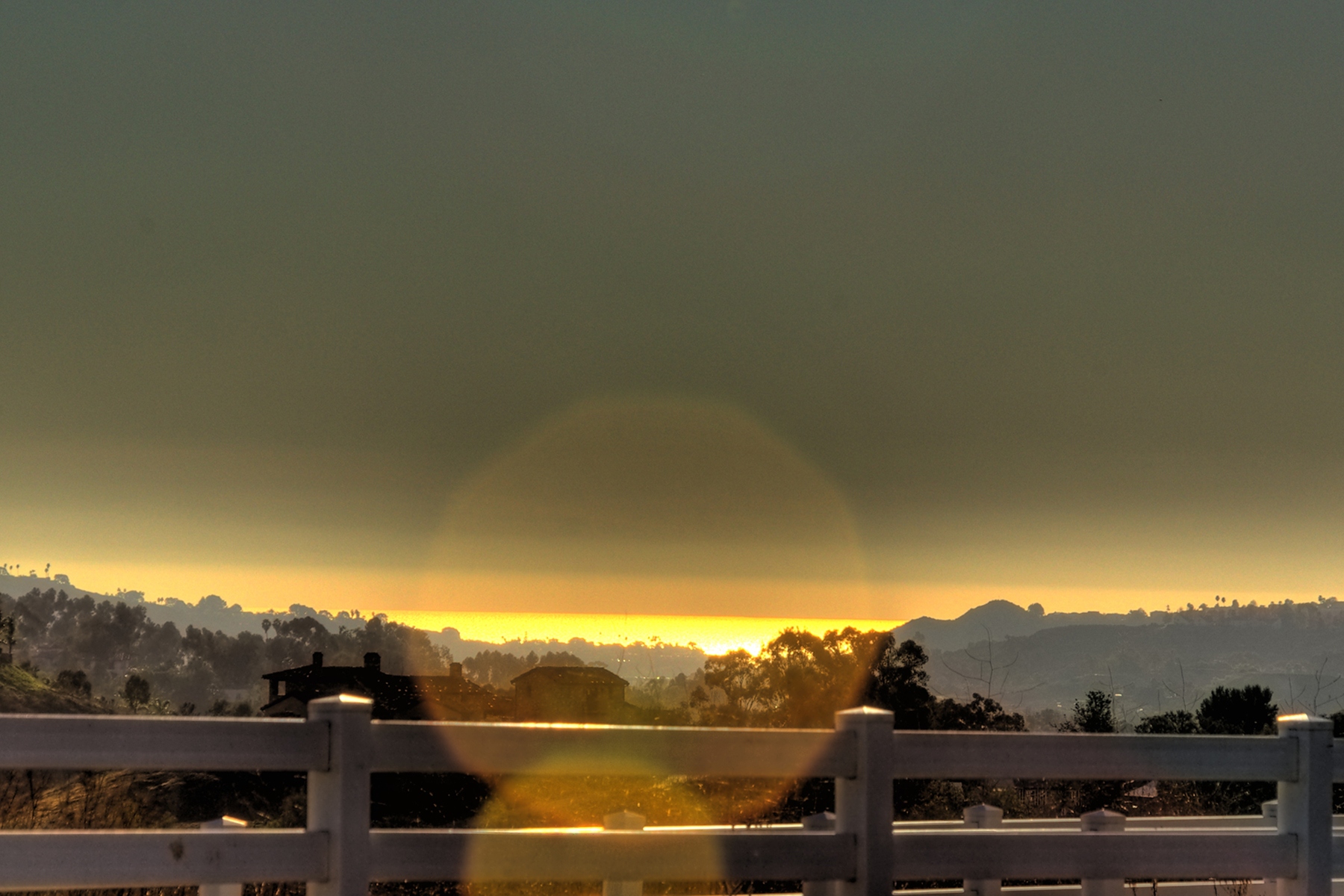
View of the Pacific Ocean from Olivenhain, CA.

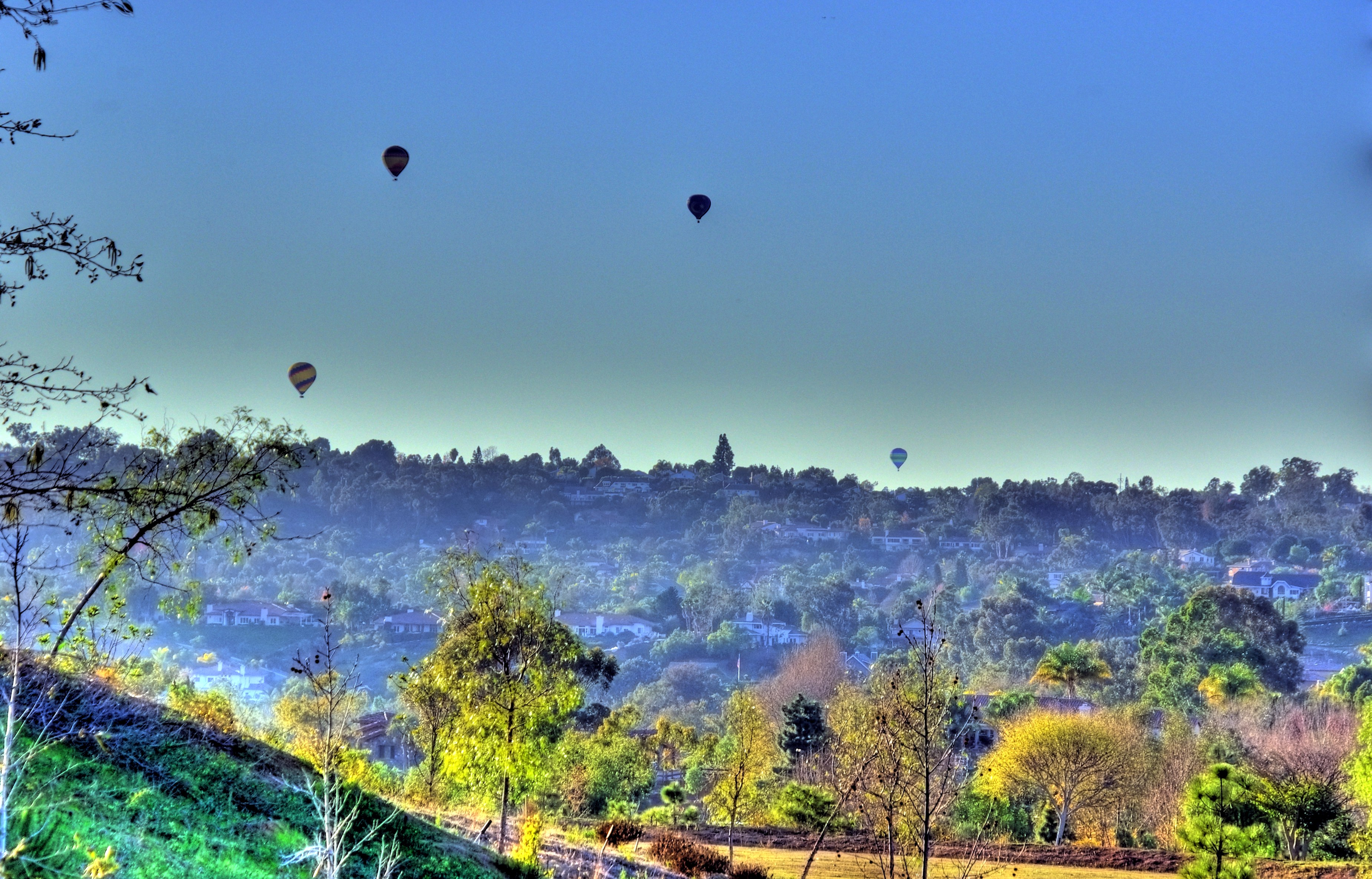
Hot air balloons are a common sight during late afternoons and dusk over Olivenhain, CA.

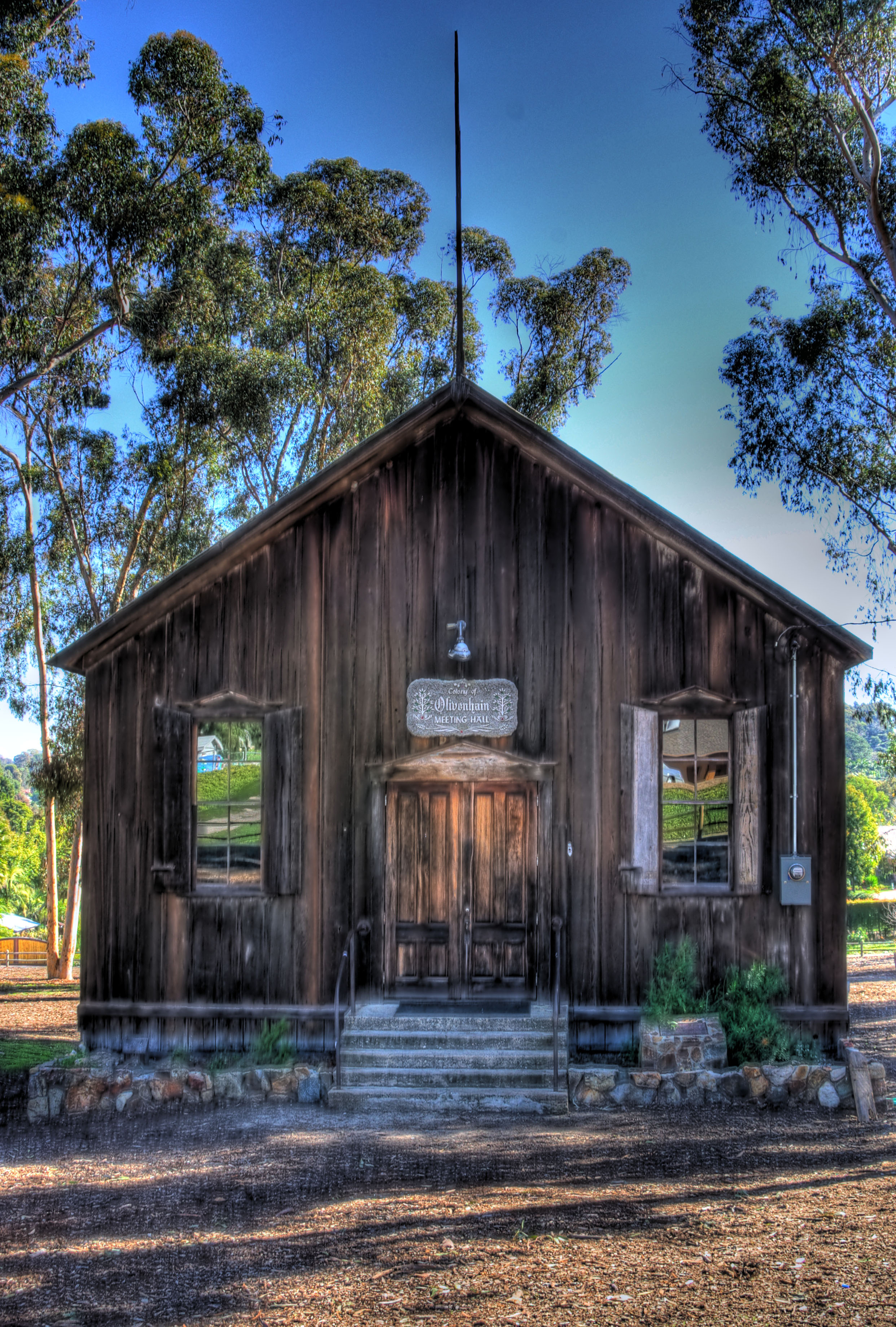
The Olivenhain Meeting Hall.
