= Horton Plaza =

Horton Plaza may refer to two places in San Diego, California:

- Horton Plaza Park, a historic city park
- Horton Plaza (shopping mall)
