= Horton Grand Hotel =

Historic building in San Diego, California, U.S.

- Grand-Horton Hotel
- U.S. National Register of Historic Places
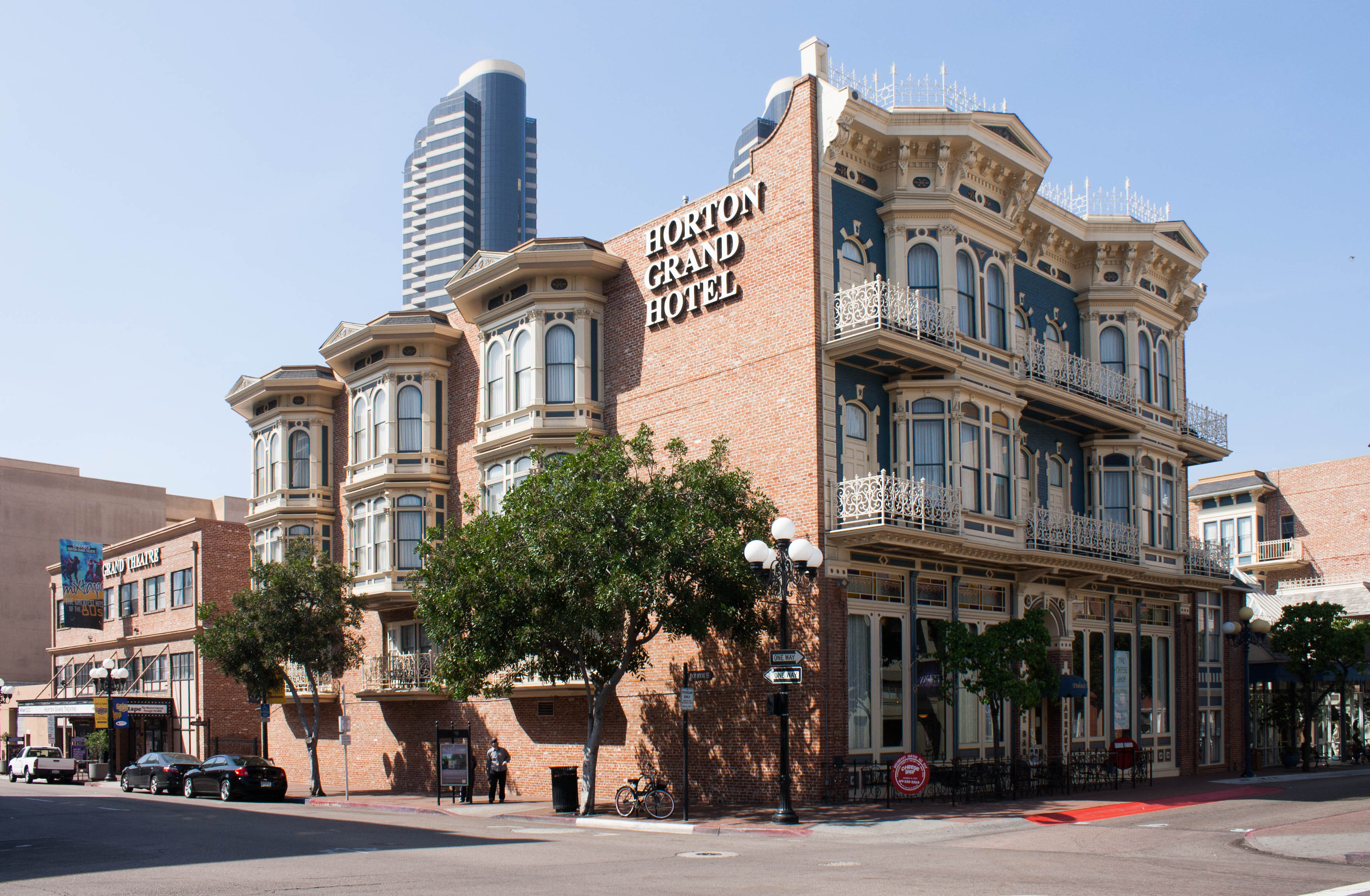
- Horton Grand Hotel

- Location within San Diego Location within San Diego County, California Location within California Location within the United States
- Location: 311 Island Avenue, San Diego, California
- Coordinates: 32°42′37″N 117°09′42″W
- Built: 1887
- Architect: Comstock & Trotsche
- Architectural style: Italianate Victorian
- NRHP reference No.: 80000842
- Added to NRHP: June 20, 1980

Horton Grand Hotel is a restoration of two historic hotels, the Grand Horton and the Brooklyn Kahle Saddlery, in downtown San Diego, California. The Horton-Grand was added to the National Register of Historic Places in 1980.

== History ==
Built in 1887 by Comstock & Trotsche, the Grand Horton was a luxury hotel with a design based on the Innsbruck Inn in Vienna, Austria. The Grand Horton was part of a building boom following the opening of the city's first transcontinental railroad connection in 1885. It is in the Italianate Victorian architecture style.

The Brooklyn-Kahle Saddlery Hotel was a less formal hotel that combined Western/Cowboy and Victorian styles. Built around the same time as the Grand Horton, it was originally known as the Brooklyn Hotel, but was later renamed the Kahle Saddlery due to the presence of a prominent saddle and harness shop on the building's first floor starting in 1912.

=== Demolition ===
Both hotels were scheduled for demolition in the 1970s when the City of San Diego purchased them to build the Horton Plaza shopping center on the site. The hotels were dismantled brick by brick, with each brick numbered, catalogued, and stored. In 1986, the hotels were rebuilt into an entirely new hotel at the present location at Fourth Avenue and Island Avenue.

== See also ==
- National Register of Historic Places listings in San Diego County, California
