= Statue of Ernest W. Hahn =

Statue in San Diego, California, U.S.

Ernest W. Hahn
- The statue in 2016
- Artist: Jesús Ygnacio Dominguez
- Subject: Ernest W. Hahn
- Location: San Diego, California, U.S.; 32°42′53″N 117°09′43″W

Ernest W. Hahn is a sculpture of the founder of shopping center developer Hahn Company, installed outside San Diego's Horton Plaza Park, in the U.S. state of California.

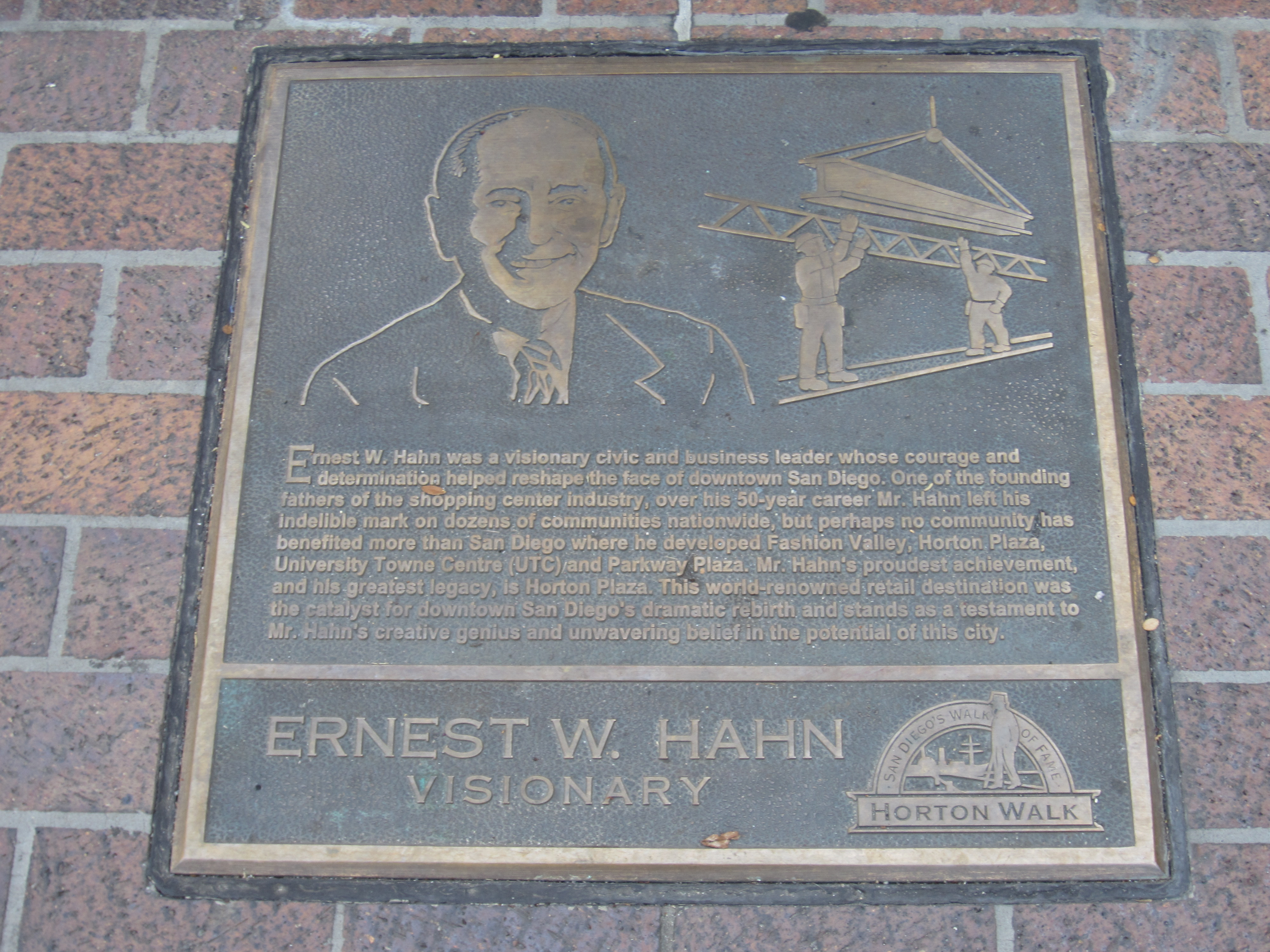
Plaque
