= Jessop's Clock =

Outdoor clock in San Diego, California, U.S.

Coordinates: 32°42′49.31″N 117°9′44.75″W

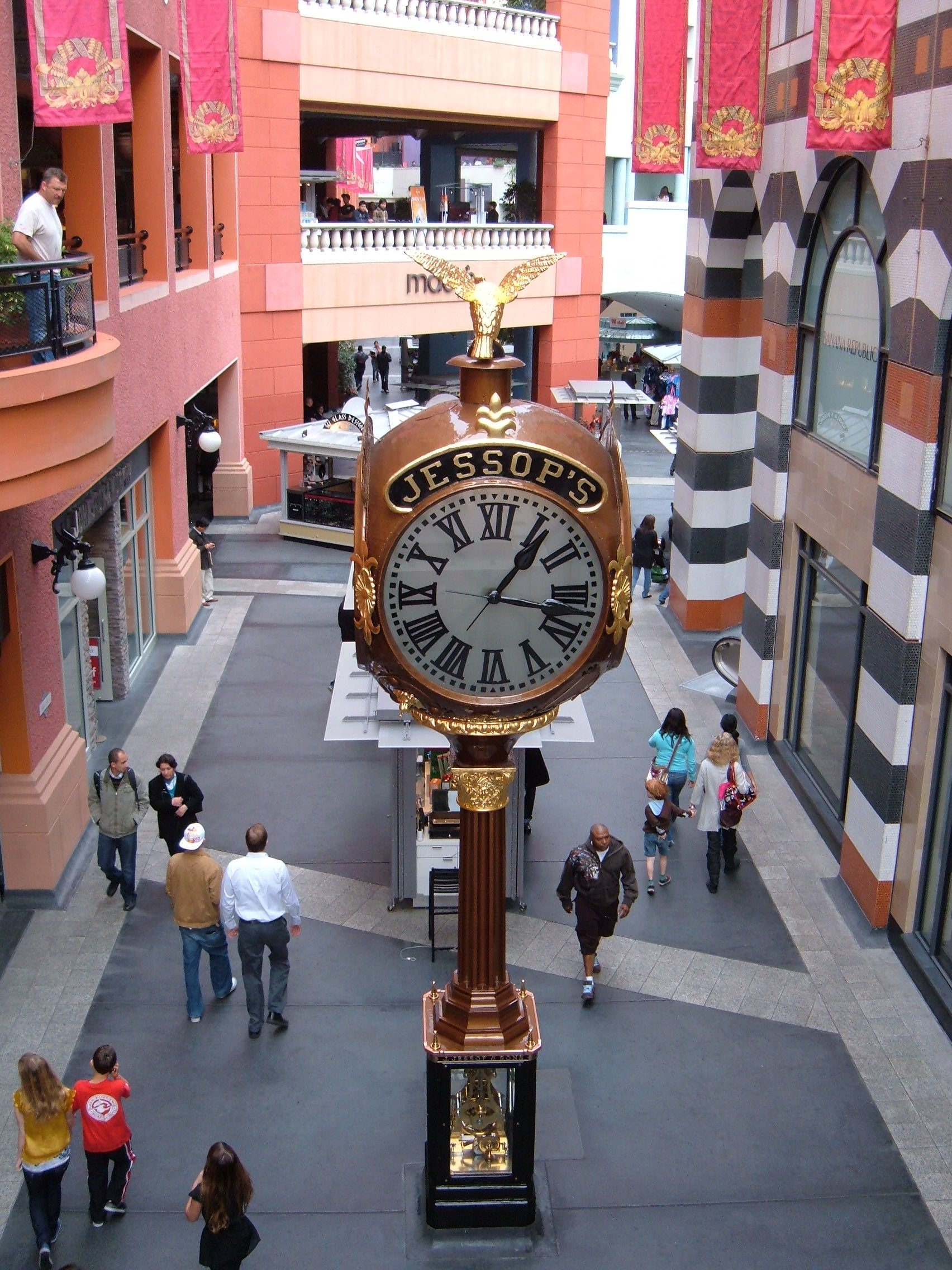
The clock in 2009

Jessop's Clock is a large outdoor pendulum clock in San Diego, California, United States. It was commissioned in 1905 by one of the city's noted jewelers, Joseph Jessop.

The clock has been a San Diego icon for more than 100 years and is designated landmark #372 on the city's list of historic landmarks. For generations of San Diegans, the clock served as both a commercial beacon for the Jessop family's jewelry store and a symbol of continuity in a rapidly changing city.

== History ==
Joseph E. Jessop was a British watchmaker and jewelry store owner from Lytham, near Blackpool, who relocated to San Diego in 1890 with his wife Mary and seven children. Suffering from serious asthma, he sought dry-weather relief and considered New Zealand, Australia, and South Africa before selecting Southern California.

Upon arrival, Jessop initially worked for K.C. Naylor, one of the major downtown jewelers at the time, while his sons did farm labor for E.W. Scripps at Miramar Ranch. To supplement his income, Jessop did freelance work, rowing out to ships anchored in the harbor to check their chronometers--the extremely precise timekeepers sailors used as navigational tools.

Within a few years, Jessop had saved enough to open his own downtown jewelry store. He commissioned his famous clock in 1905, which was built by his employee Claude D. Ledger after fifteen months of work. It won a gold medal at the 1907 Sacramento State Fair.

== Description ==
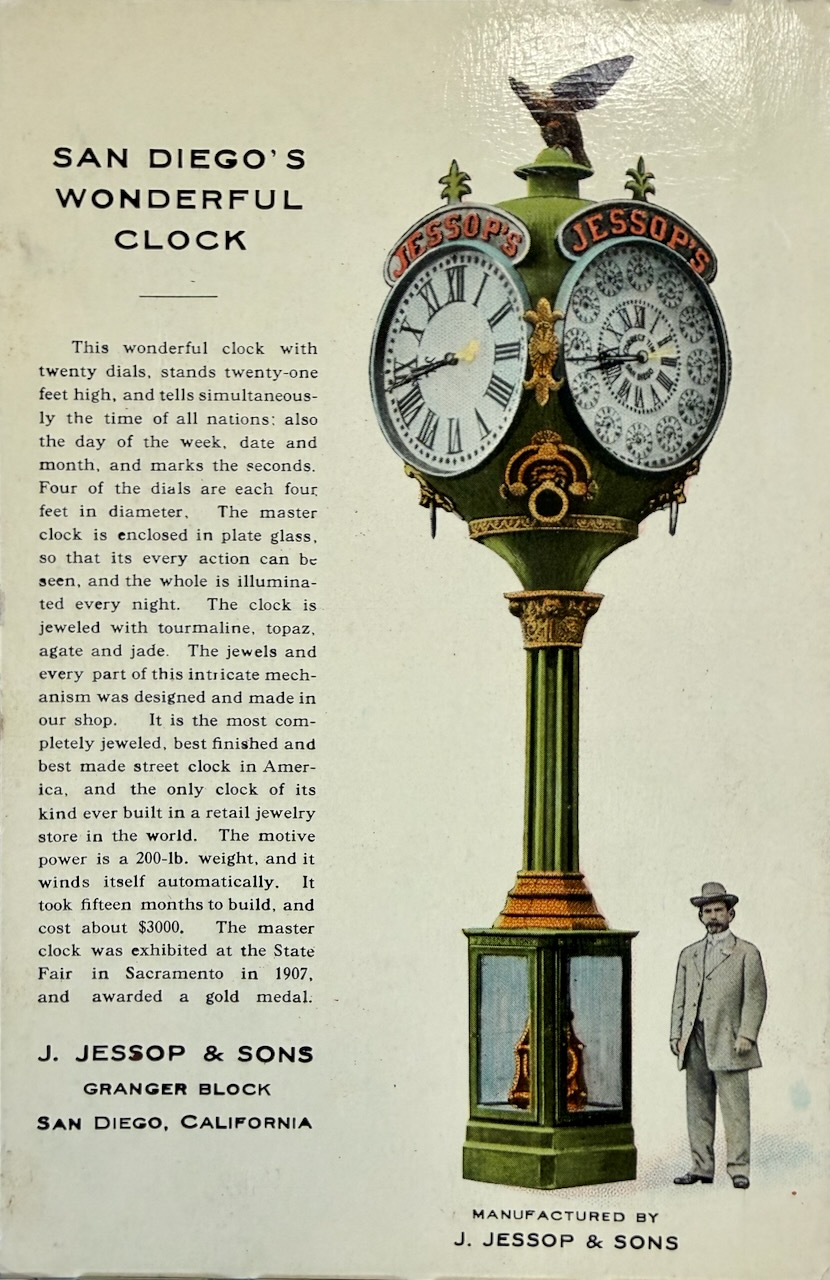
Postcard showing the Jessop Clock, San Diego, CA, ca. 1907

Jessop's clock is 22 feet (6.7 m) high and extends an additional 12 feet (3.7 m) below street level to house the movement. It is wound automatically by an electric motor every eight hours.

The handmade clock has 300 moving parts--17 faces, 17 jewels, gears, an escapement mechanism, and a pendulum--representing an extraordinary feat of craftsmanship in a pre-digital age. It tells the local time in hours, minutes and seconds, as well as the day of the week and the month of the year. It displays not only San Diego time but also the hour in 12 other cities around the world, including New York, London, Paris, Berlin, Tokyo, Hong Kong, and Calcutta. As such, it embodied the era's global interconnection through synchronized timekeeping--a system essential to coordinating railways, international shipping schedules, and the expanding networks of global commerce.

== Location ==
Following its exhibition in Sacramento, the clock was installed on the sidewalk in front of the J. Jessop and Sons jewelry store at 952 Fifth Avenue in San Diego. In 1927, the Jessops relocated their downtown business to 1041 Fifth Avenue and the clock was moved accordingly. It is reported that on the day of Ledger's death, Jessop's clock stopped working for reasons unknown. It was restarted and continued keeping time on the streets of San Diego.

After standing on the sidewalk in front of the Jessop and Sons jewelry store in downtown San Diego for most of the 20th century, it was moved in 1984 to Horton Plaza, a multistory downtown shopping center.

In April 2009 the clock stopped working. A few months later it was given a two-month refurbishing and cleaning paid for by the Jessop family. Joseph Jessop's 98-year-old great-grandson, David Jessop Jr., officially restarted the 102-year-old clock on November 5, 2009.

In 2012, Westfield, the owners of the Horton Plaza shopping center at the time, terminated the rental agreement with the Jessop family. In 2019, the clock was dismantled and moved into storage. It will be reassembled by 2028 to form the centerpiece of a permanent exhibit within the San Diego History Center in the Casa de Balboa building in Balboa Park.
