= Balboa Theatre (San Diego) =

Historic movie theater in San Diego, California

Balboa Theatre - San Diego, CA
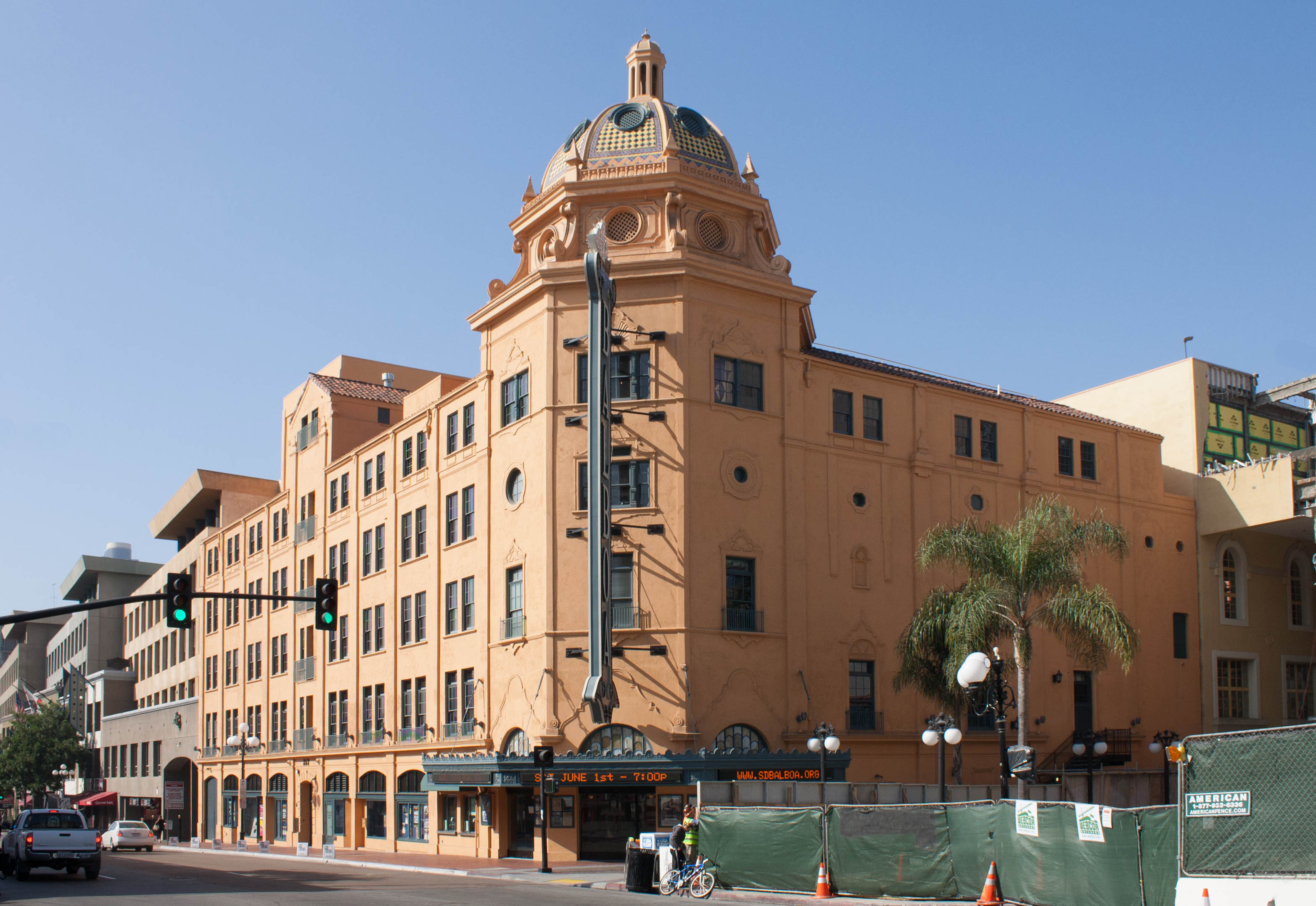
- Interactive map of Balboa Theatre - San Diego, CA
- Address: 868 Fourth Avenue; San Diego, California; United States
- Owner: City of San Diego
- Operator: San Diego Theatres
- Capacity: 1,339
- Current use: Performing arts venue

Construction
- Opened: 1924
- Reopened: 2008
- Architects: Wheeler, William H.; Wurster Construction Co. et al.

Website
- sandiegotheatres.org
- Balboa Theatre
- U.S. National Register of Historic Places
- San Diego Historic Landmark
- Location within San Diego Location within San Diego County, California Location within California Location within the United States
- Coordinates: 32°42′50″N 117°9′38″W
- Architectural style: Mission/Spanish Revival
- NRHP reference No.: 96001177
- SDHL No.: 77

Significant dates
- Added to NRHP: October 24, 1996
- Designated SDHL: August 4, 1972

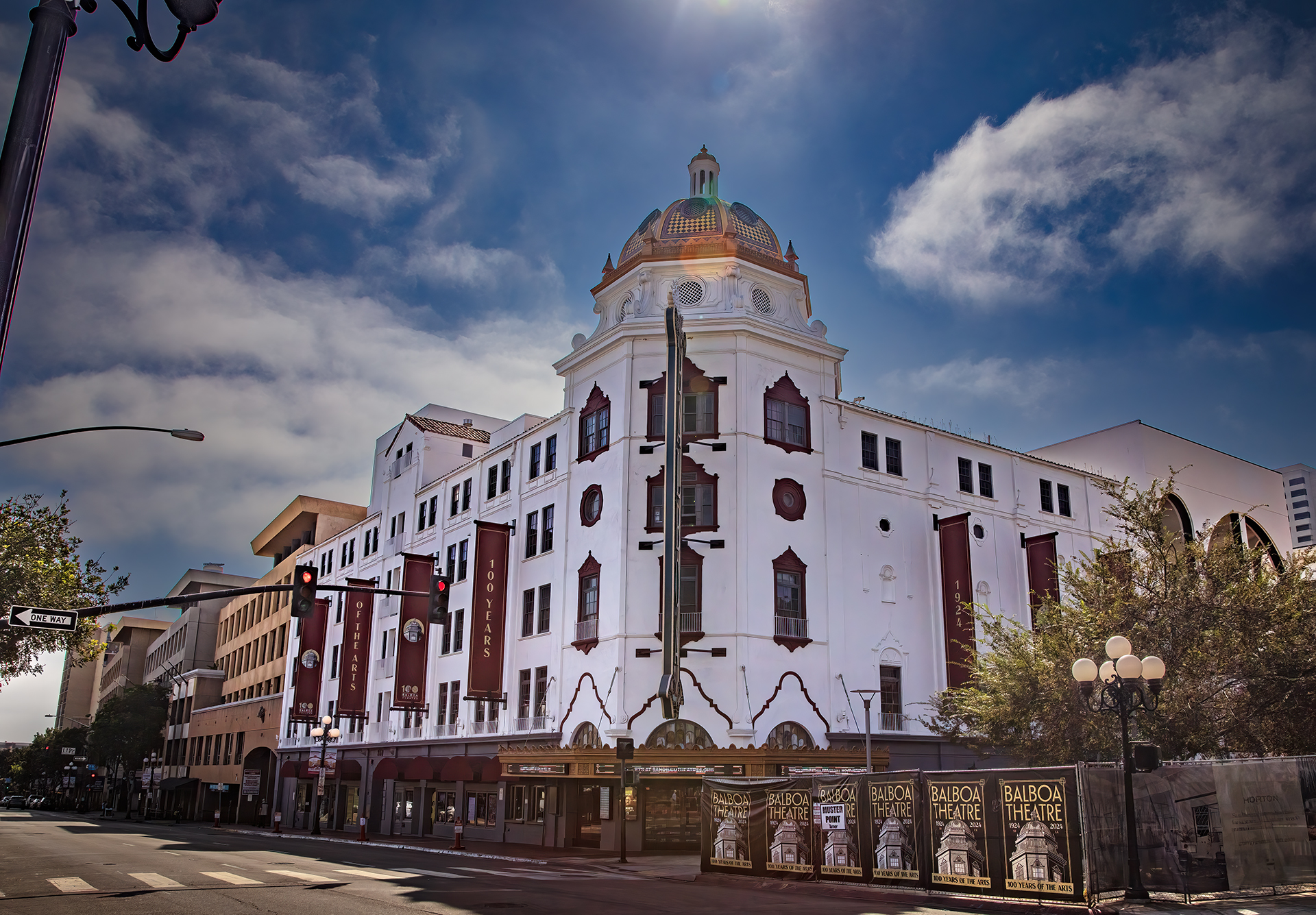
The theater in October 2024 (100th anniversary)

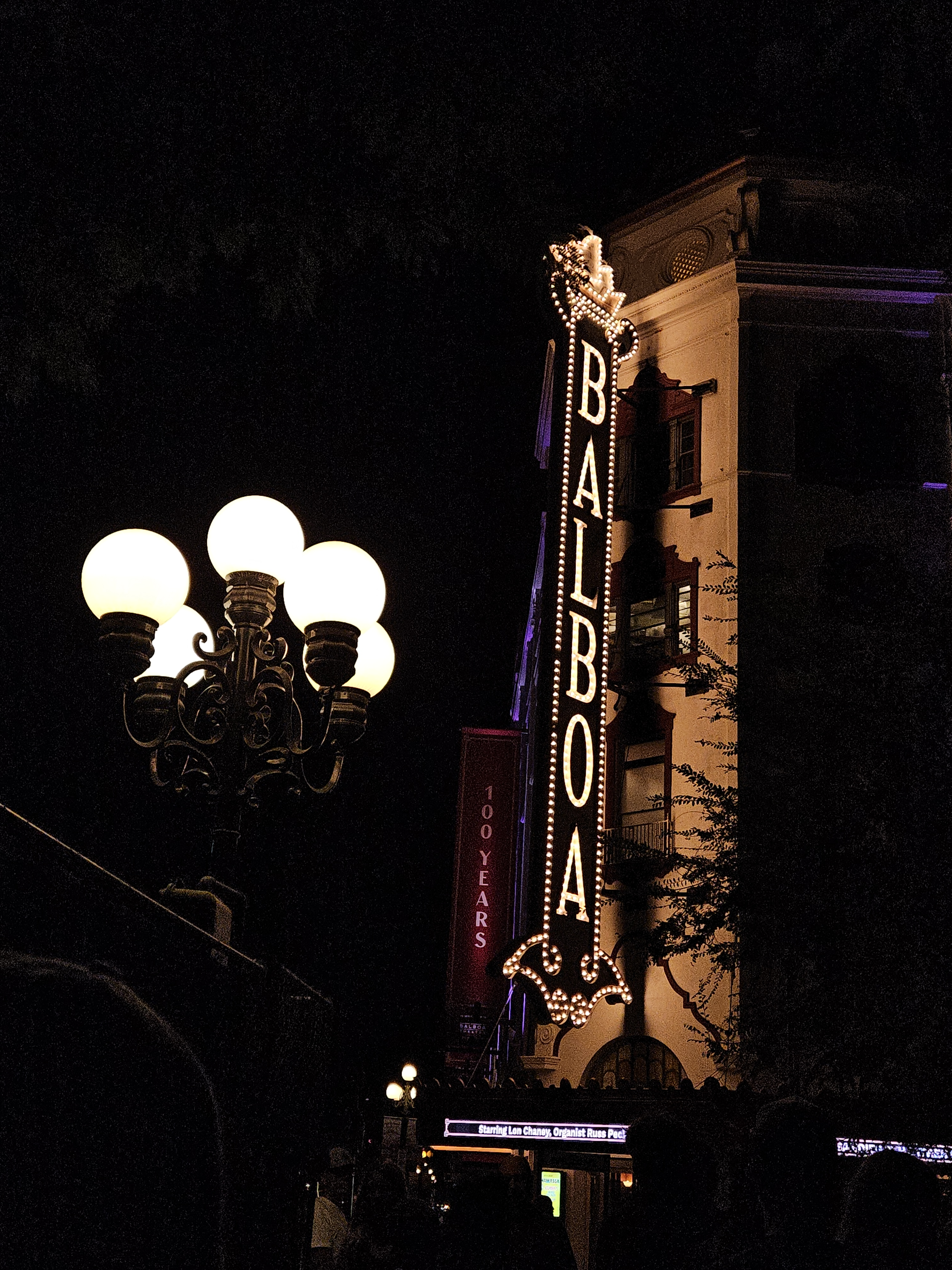
Photo taken of Balboa Theatre in downtown San Diego, Oct 2024.

Balboa Theatre is a historic movie and vaudeville theatre in downtown San Diego, California, United States. It was built in 1924. Listed on the National Register of Historic Places in 1996, Balboa Theatre was refurbished (beginning in 2005) and reopened as a performing arts venue in 2008.

== History ==
Balboa Theatre was built by businessman Robert E. Hicks, architect William H. Wheeler, by the Wurster Construction Company for $800,000 in 1924. A grand vaudeville/movie palace combining Moorish and Spanish Revival styles, the single-balcony theatre originally had a seating capacity of 1,513; waterfalls on either side of the proscenium arch provided air cooling.

As part of the Fox West Coast circuit, Balboa Theatre featured live vaudeville and movies, accompanied by orchestra and organ. An article from the American Theatre Organ Society states that Edward Swan was the organist at Balboa Theatre in 1925-26 and he claims that the original 426 pipe Robert Morton organ was the finest he had ever played. It had an echo organ over the balcony. He “played the features while the small orchestra did the vaudeville segments. Sometimes Ed also played the organ or piano with the orchestra and his playing time lengthened to 10 or 12 hours a day.” In 1930 the theatre was upgraded for sound pictures and a new neon marquee was added. In 1934, it was remodeled, reopening as Teatro Balboa, featuring Spanish-language films. The theatre's office space was converted to housing for the U.S. Navy during World War II.

The theater in 1979

After the war, Balboa languished as a movie house and in 1959 was purchased by the Russo family. Because of its rich history and splendid architecture, Balboa Theatre was designated as a historic site in 1972. Although the 1973 Horton Plaza Redevelopment Plan called for complete restoration of the building as a theatre, the City of San Diego instead condemned it; the Centre City Development Corporation (CCDC) made plans to gut the theatre for commercial space, intending to strip the interior and build four floors of retail space.

== Restoration ==
In 1985, a small group of advocates led by Steve Karo formed the Save Our Balboa Organization to lobby against destruction of the theatre and to support its restoration. The Save Our Balboa group garnered public support and eventually prevailed in a long and hard-fought effort to stop destruction of the theatre. The Save Our Balboa Organization developed into the Balboa Theatre Foundation which continued lobbying for restoration and in 1996, succeeded in listing Balboa Theatre on the National Register of Historic Places. After twenty years, CCDC did a turnaround and decided to fund a complete restoration which began in 2005. They not only funded, at a cost of $26.5 million, but managed the project, working with restoration architects Westlake Reed Leskosky, now DLR Group. The theatre re-opened in 2008 and is now a venue for live theatre and concerts.

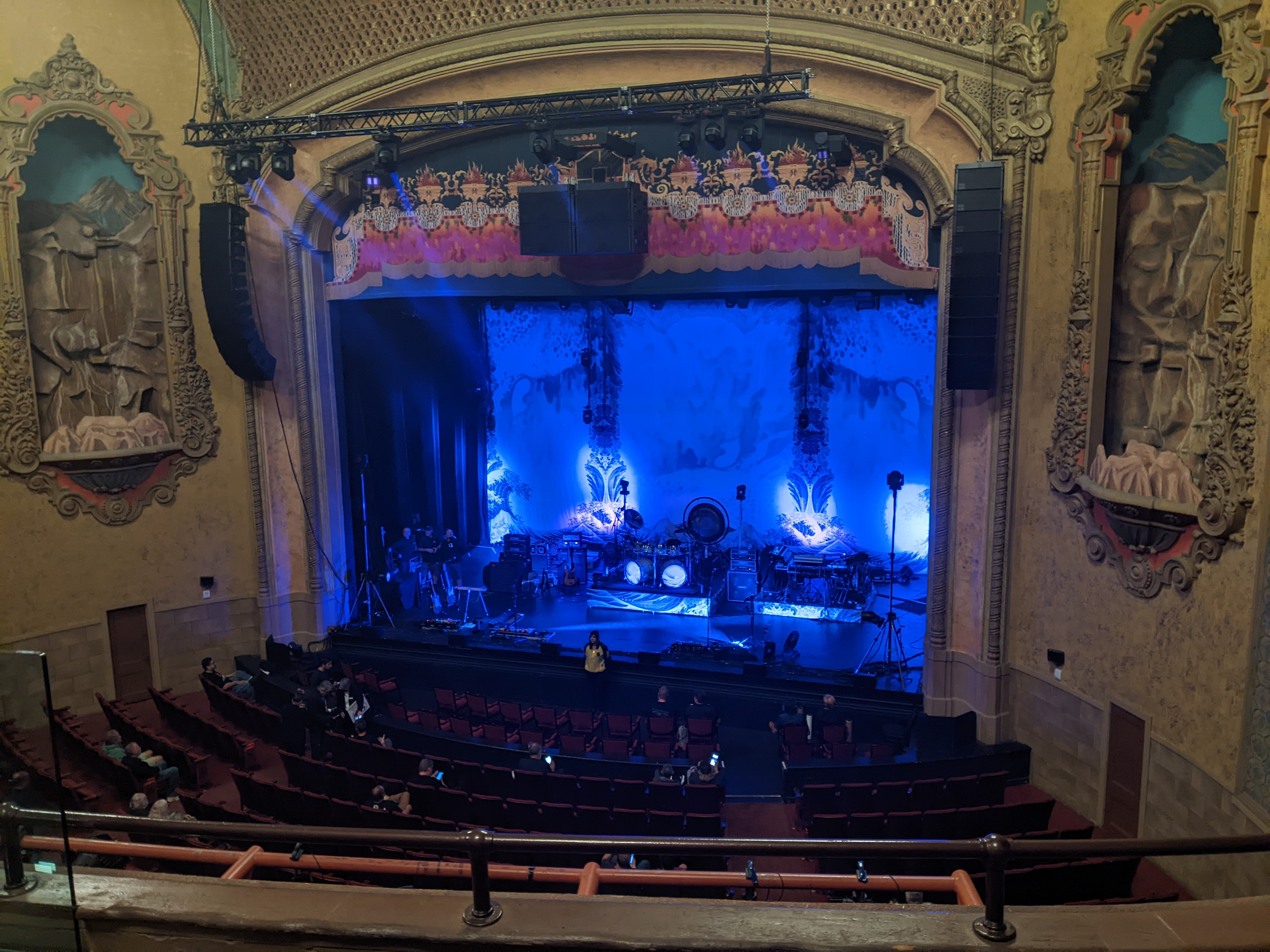
Interior of the Balboa Theatre before a concert in 2022

In 2009, after extensive renovation, the Balboa Theatre Foundation rededicated a 1929 Wonder Morton organ, one of only four such organs in the world. The Foundation purchased, restored and relocated the 4-manual, 23-rank organ from Pennsylvania to Balboa Theatre after a five-year-long restoration. The original Robert Morton organ was moved to the Fox Theatre in 1929, which is now Jacobs Music Center.

== Current use ==
Balboa Theatre now hosts the Mainly Mozart Festival, special events, and touring companies of Broadway productions. The city of San Diego holds the annual "State of the City" address at the theatre.
