= Horton Plaza (shopping mall) =

Shopping mall in San Diego, California

Coordinates: 32°42′49″N 117°9′45″W

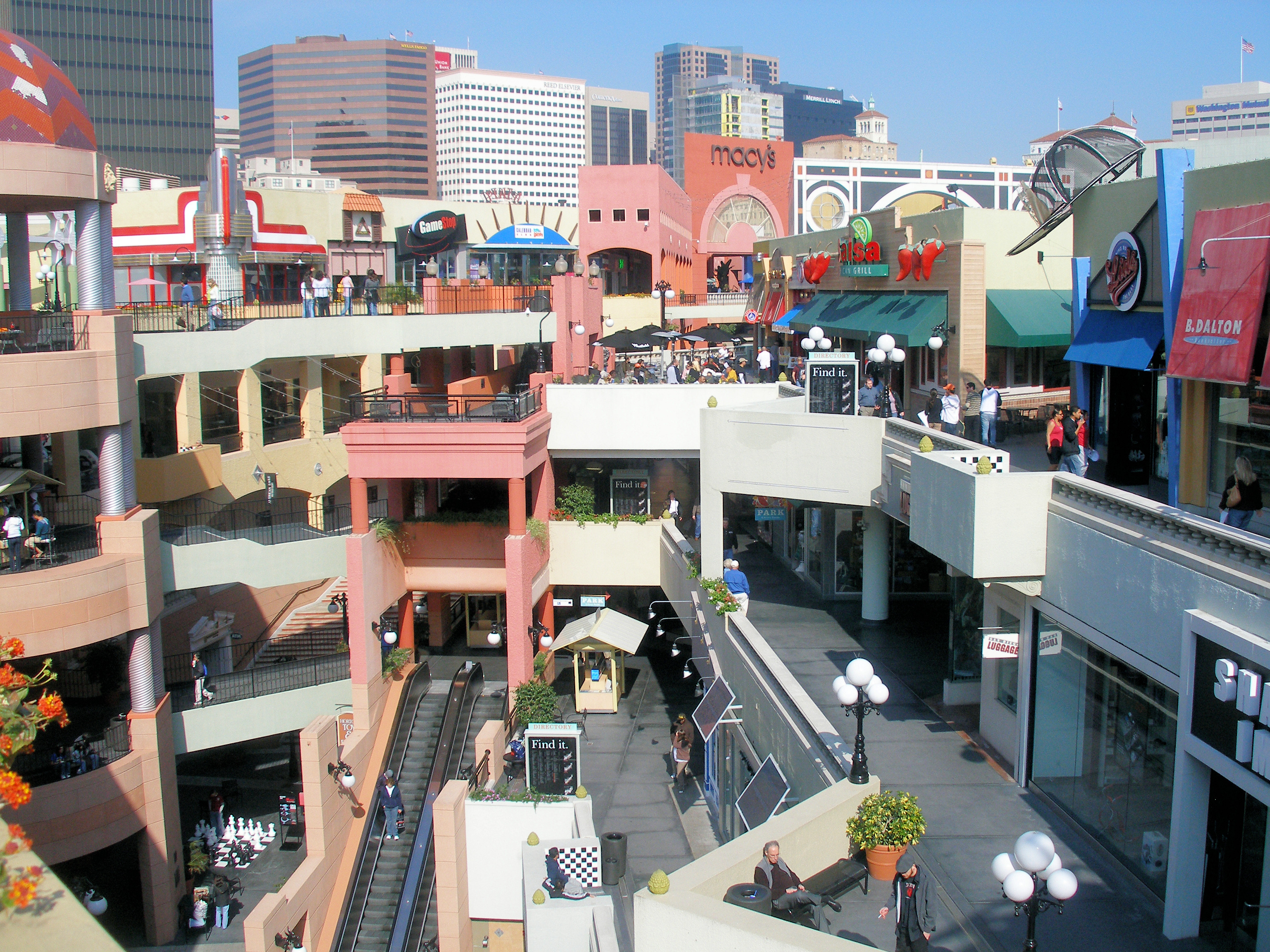
- Westfield Horton Plaza (as it was then called) in 2008.
- Location: San Diego, California, United States
- Address: 324 Horton Plaza
- Opened: August 9, 1985; 41 years ago
- Closed: May 2020
- Developer: The Hahn Company
- Owner: Alliance Bernstein
- Num. of stores: 0
- Num. of anchor tenants: 0
- Floor area: 758,003 sq ft (70,420.8 m^{2})
- Floors: 5
- Parking: 2,189
- Public transit: Civic Center station

Horton Plaza was a five-level outdoor shopping mall in downtown San Diego, California. It was designed by Jon Jerde and was known for its bright colors, architectural tricks, and odd spatial rhythms, occupying 6.5 city blocks adjacent to the city's historic Gaslamp Quarter. Opening in 1985, it was the first successful downtown retail center since the rise of suburban shopping centers decades earlier.

In August 2018, the property was sold to developer Stockdale Capital Partners, which plans to convert it into an office-retail complex. RDC is the architect of record. Nordstrom closed in 2016, leaving a vacant anchor store, and the other major anchor, Macy's, closed in spring 2020. Contrary to some reports the mall was not demolished. Massive renovations of the mall began in June 2020.

== Design ==
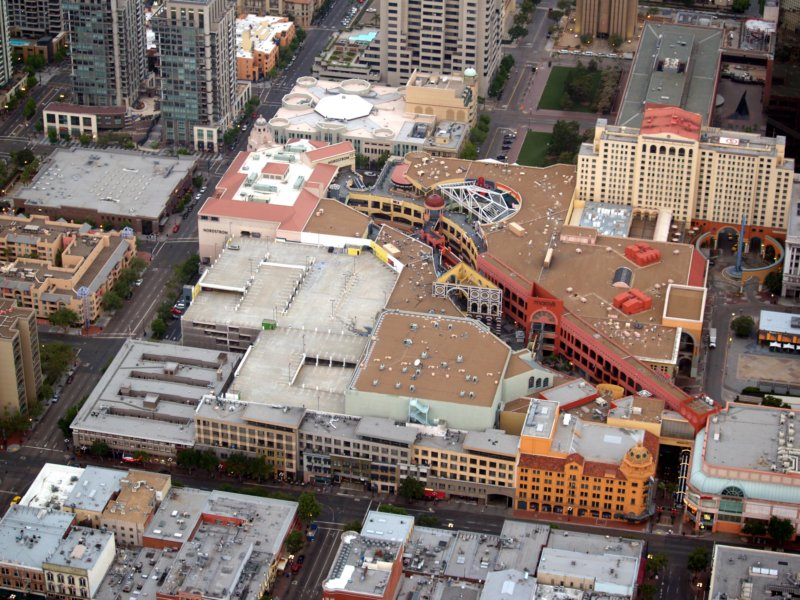
Aerial view facing west from 1,000 feet (300 m) (2011)

=== Site ===
The mall site is approximately rectangular, bounded by E Street / Broadway Circle (to the north), Fourth (on the east), G (south), and First (west).

The three-level central courtyard, which Jerde called an "armature" for pedestrians, runs diagonally between the southwest and northeast corners. The main parking garages are within the southeast corner of the complex, accessible from both G Street and Fourth Avenue. There were four anchor tenants when the mall opened in 1985:

1. The Broadway (later Macy's), in the central northern end of the complex until 2020
2. Mervyn's was an original anchor on the western end of the complex until 2005; the space was later divided with Jimbo's Naturally as the main tenant
3. Nordstrom was one of the original anchor tenants, operating a store at the southwest corner of the complex until 2016
4. J. W. Robinson's department store was in a detached building just north of the northeast corner of the main shopping center; that building was demolished in 2012 to expand Horton Plaza Park

The northeast corner is occupied by the historic Balboa Theatre (completed in 1924); Horton Plaza Park lies north of the mall and Balboa Theatre, between Fourth Avenue and Broadway Circle, facing the U.S. Grant Hotel. The mall's northwest corner adjoins the 450-room Westin San Diego Gaslamp Quarter hotel, completed in 1987 as the Omni San Diego, subsequently acquired by DoubleTree in 1992 and later renamed to the Westin Horton Plaza in 1997 after the property was acquired by Starwood; it was rebranded in 2008 to its current name. The southeast corner of the site is occupied by the Golden West Hotel, which has been converted to single room occupancy apartments, walled off from the mall by the two parking garages; the hotel was built in 1913 by John D. Spreckels and designed by John Lloyd Wright.

The main pedestrian entrance was near Broadway Circle next to the Macy's store, leading into the northeast end of the central courtyard / armature through a pastel colonnade. The underground Lyceum Theatre is marked by an obelisk next to the main entrance at Broadway Circle, next to a statue of mall developer Ernest W. Hahn. Approximately halfway along the central courtyard, a triangular black-and-white striped loggia named the Palazzo Building housed escalators extending the height of the mall, likened to the Siena Cathedral in 1986 by The New York Times.

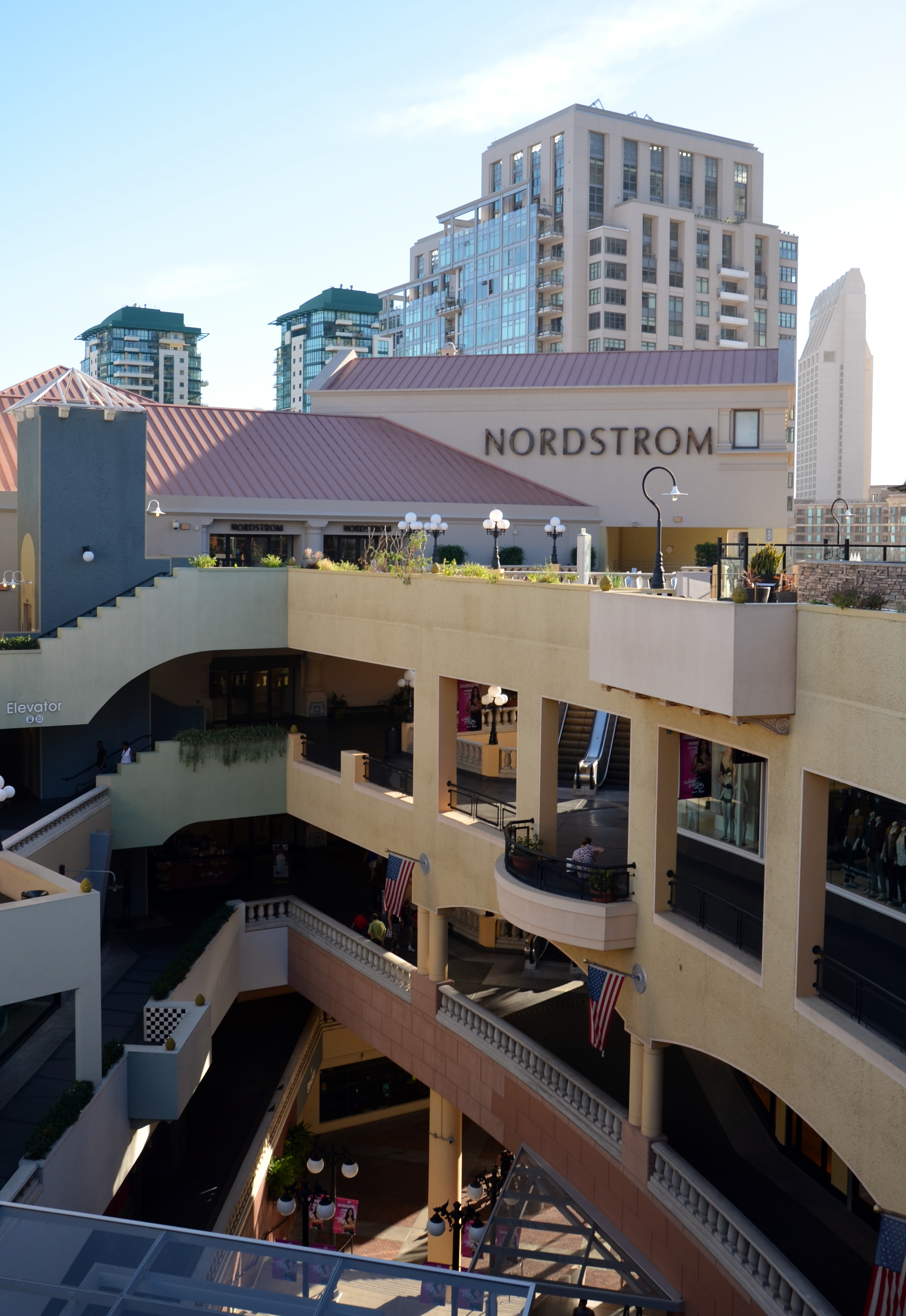
View southwest towards Nordstrom anchor (2015)

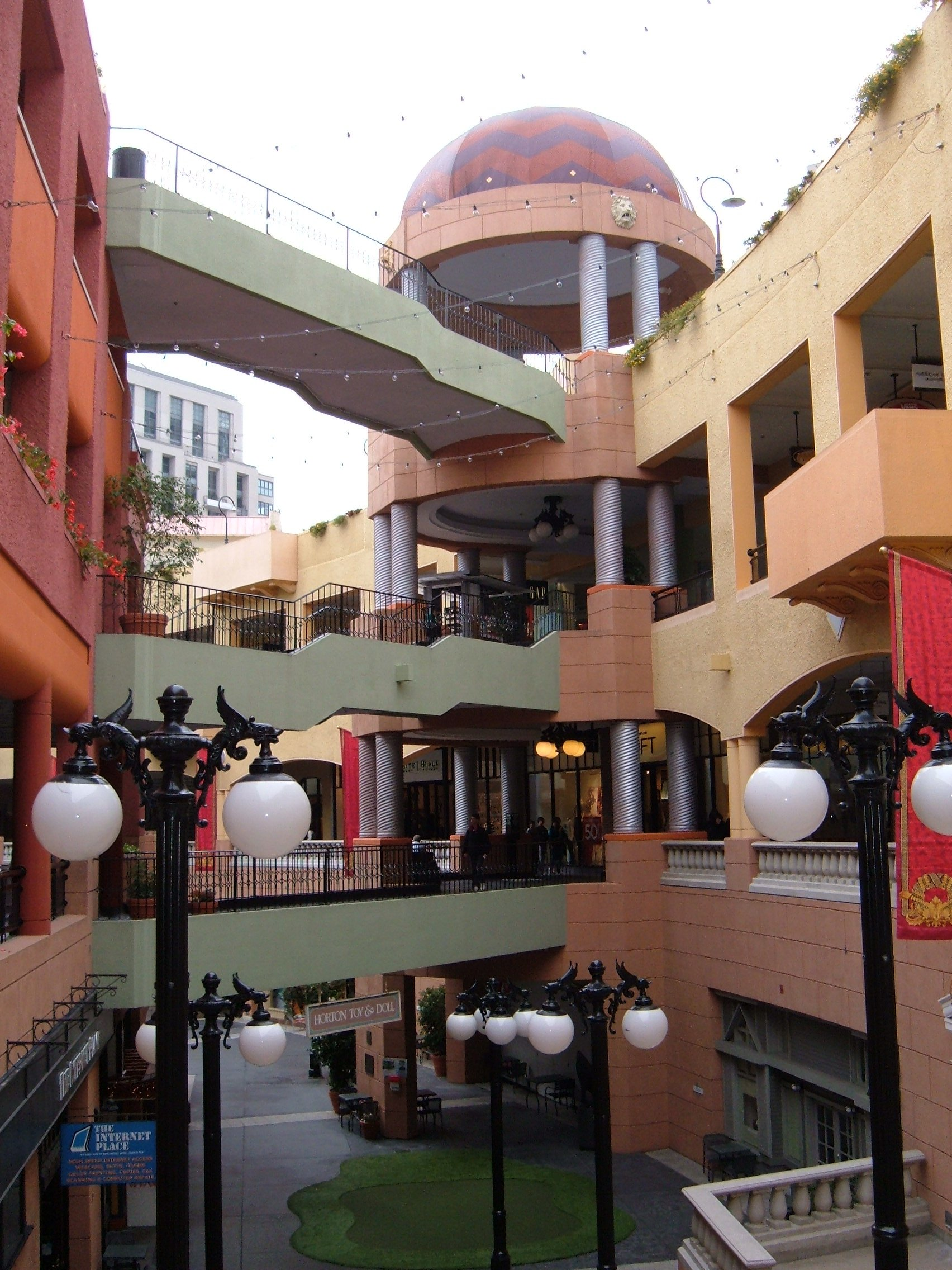
Balconies connecting north and south sides of courtyard (2009)

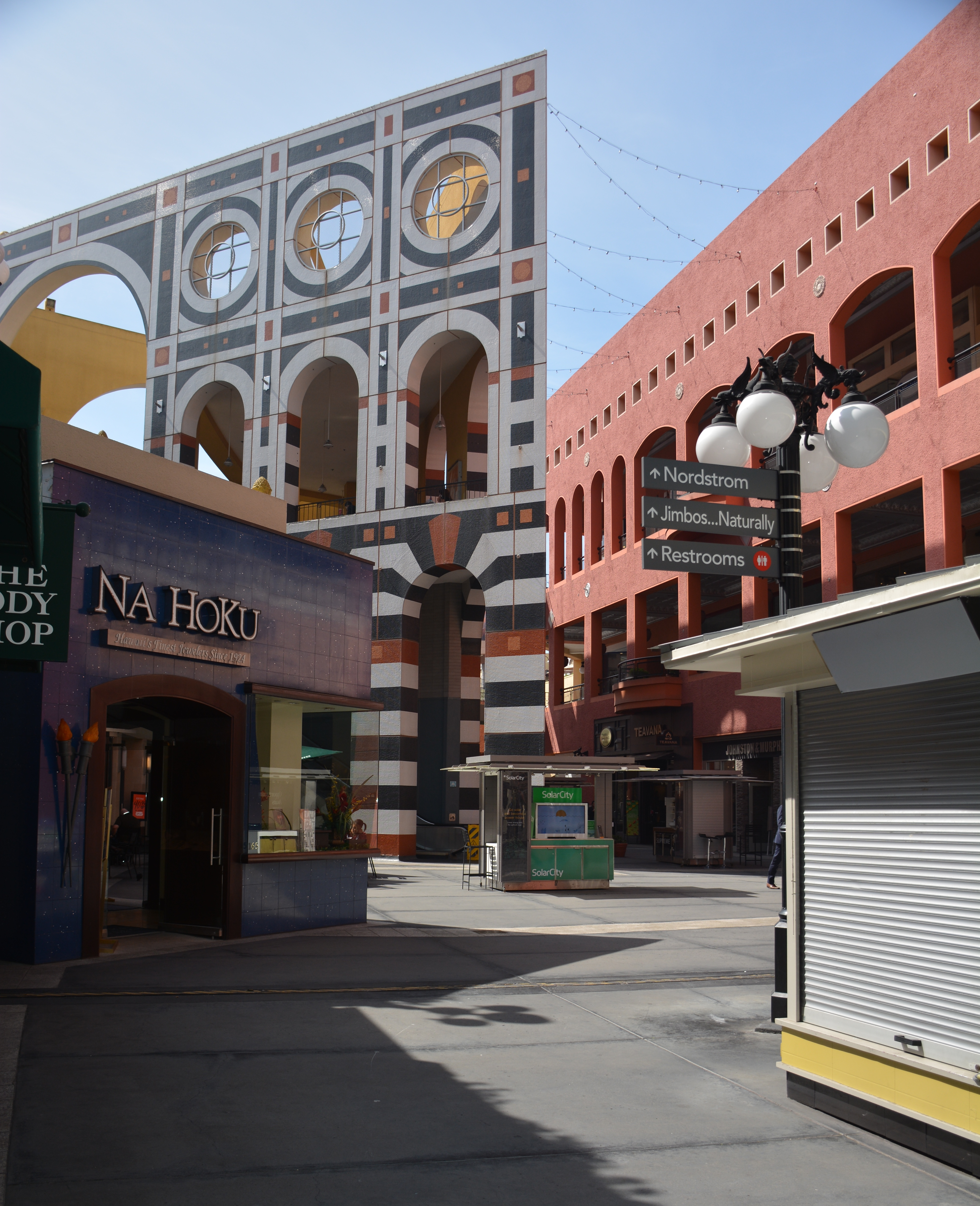
View southwest near Palazzo Building, approximately mid-way along central courtyard (2015)

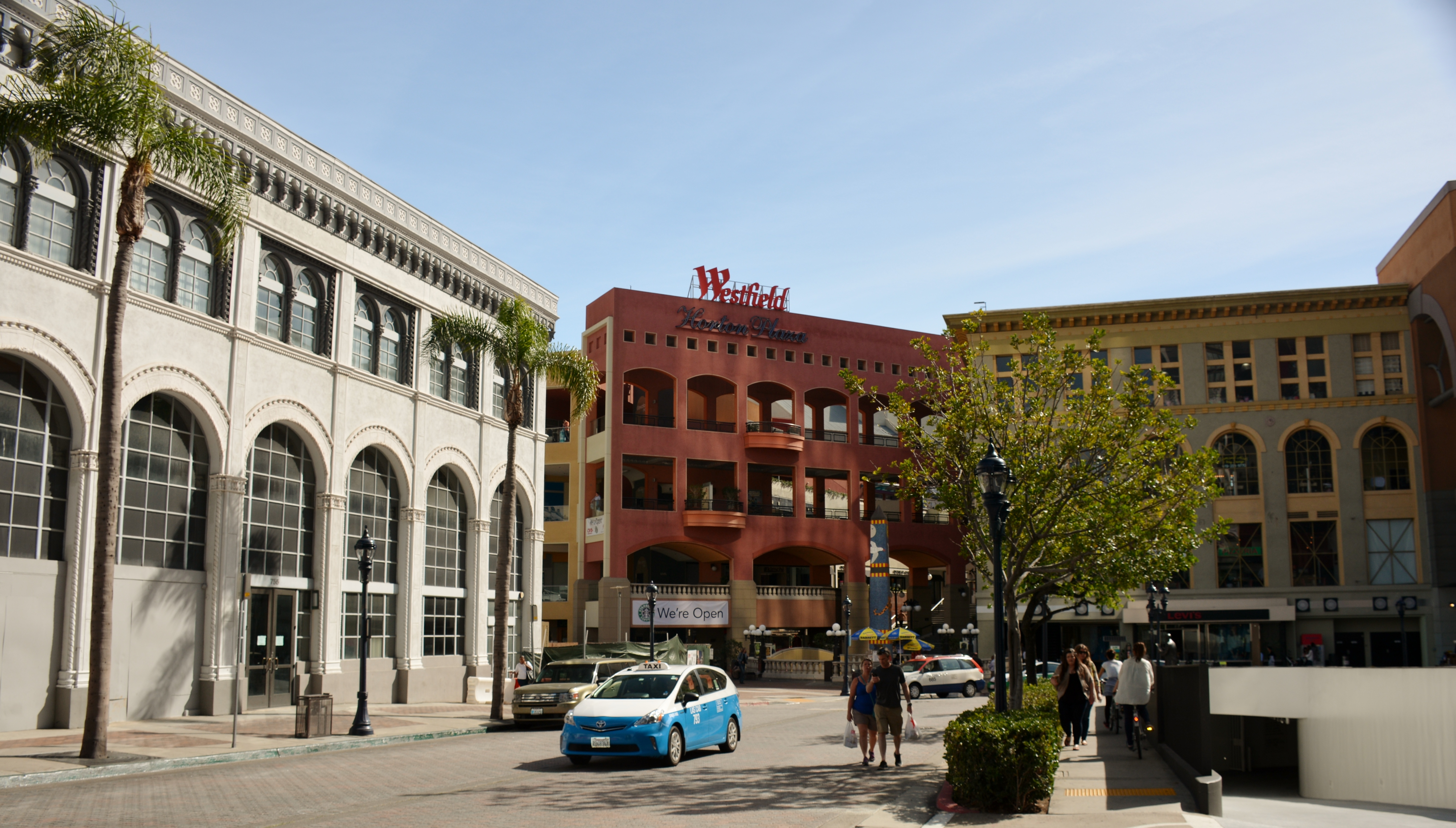
View southwest towards main entrance (red-orange colonnade in center), from Broadway Circle (2016)

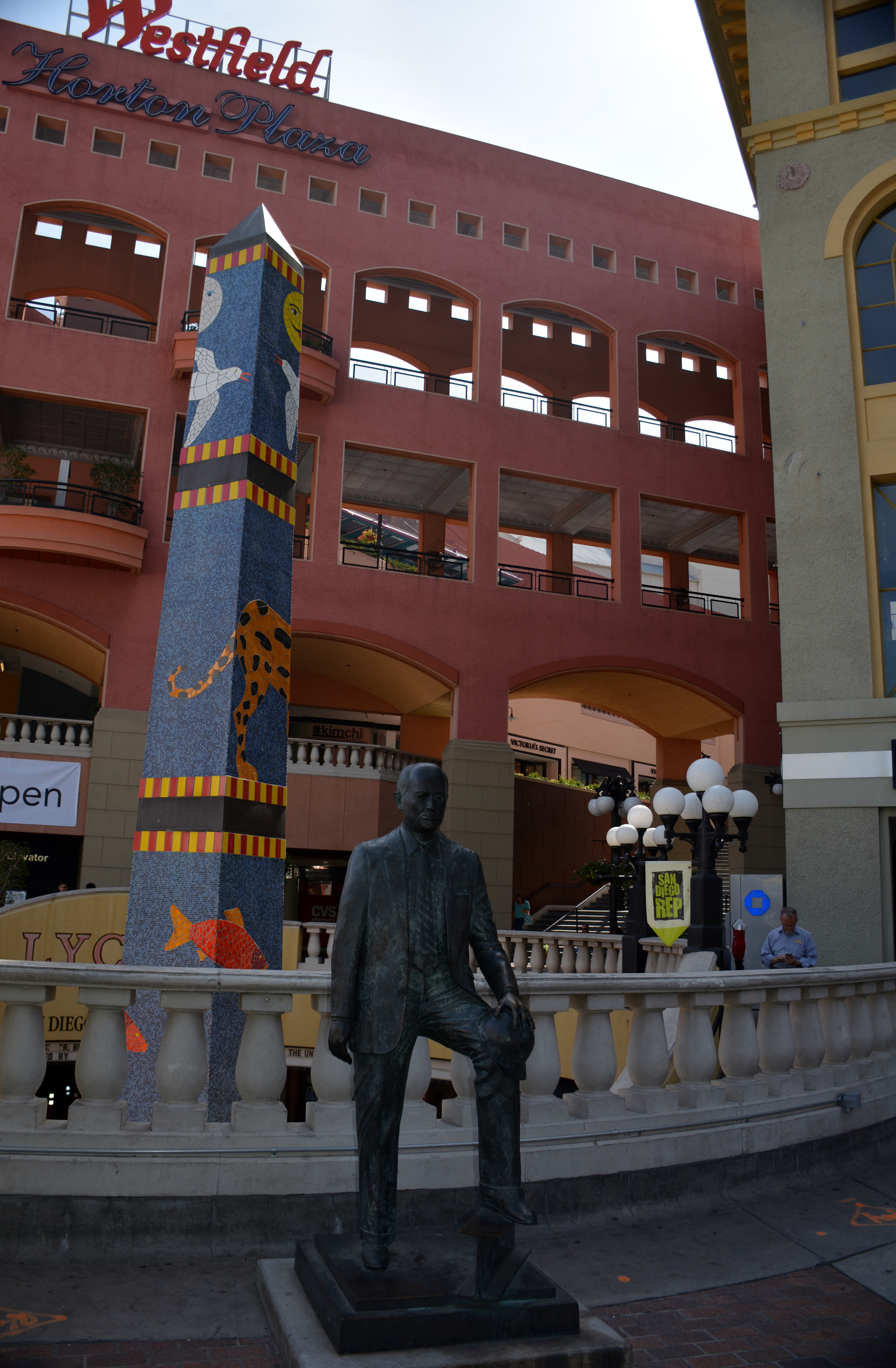
Statue of Ernest W. Hahn and Lyceum Theatre obelisk, near main entrance (2016)

=== Architecture ===
It was a risky and radical departure from the standard paradigm of mall design. The building's postmodern design featured mismatched levels, long one-way ramps, sudden drop-offs, dramatic parapets, shadowy colonnades, cul-de-sacs, and brightly painted facades constructed around a central courtyard.

An initial design for the Horton Plaza Redevelopment Project, featuring mainly public park space with a small retail section, was commissioned by the city of San Diego and completed in 1973 by Rockrise, Odermatt, Mountjoy and Amis. In his 1974 bid, Hahn commissioned a design by Archisystems, reworked by Frank Hope III into an enclosed mall over a parking structure after Hahn won the development rights; San Diego's redevelopment agency, CCDC, panned the revised design by Hope as too conservative.

Jerde was hired by Hahn in 1977 to modify the Hope design; the first proposal from Jerde, submitted by the end of that year, retained much of Hope's design, and similarly was rejected by CCDC. By 1981, Jerde began developing a more unconventional, vertically-oriented design, driven in part by Hahn signing five anchor tenants and his directive to "take the lid off", implemented literally by removing the roof in the final open-air design. The painted cardboard model debuted in a theatrical "happening"; the model has since been preserved and exhibited at the San Diego History Center.

Jerde's project was based on Ray Bradbury's essay "The Aesthetics of Lostness". In it he extolled the virtues of getting "safely lost" as adults inspired by side streets of Paris, London, or New York. At the time that Horton Plaza was being designed, Jerde was meeting weekly with Bradbury and others to brainstorm architectural designs. Jerde called the central courtyard an "armature", functioning as a three-storey pedestrian street with entrances aligned with the city blocks outside, featuring two shallow arcs designed to encourage meandering.

== History ==
Horton Plaza Redevelopment Area, view facing north-northeast (c.1940s) with mall (1985) overlaid; U.S. Grant Hotel and Golden West Hotel labeled

=== Origins and construction (1972–1982) ===
The original proposal for the shopping center and a redevelopment district arose out of plans to "refurbish San Diego's historic town plaza", Horton Plaza, named for Alonzo Horton, who was largely responsible for the location of downtown San Diego. The proposal, which included office buildings and the federal courthouse complex, was adopted by the San Diego City Council in 1972.

Local developer Ernest Hahn signed an exclusive negotiating contract in 1974 and purchased the land for US$1 million in 1978, conditioned on building parking garages. Hahn also specified numerous improvements required in downtown San Diego before he could start construction, including the completion of the San Diego Trolley, the approval of the San Diego Convention Center, and the establishment of the Centre City Development Corporation. In August 1979, the city council approved Hahn's plans to proceed with the construction of Horton Plaza, starting with the relocation of many businesses and the demolition of several historic structures, including the Lyceum, Cabrillo, and Plaza Theatres (Note: The Cabrillo (built 1915) and Plaza (built 1913) were in neighboring buildings south of the town square (Horton Plaza), facing the fountain.) and the Horton Grand Hotel; several buildings that were on the National Register of Historic Places were removed and/or relocated to make way for the planned retail center. (Note: These included: Grand-Horton Hotel, at F and 4th; Pythias Lodge Building, at E and 3rd; Robert E. Lee Hotel / Lyceum Theatre, at F and 3rd) Due to numerous setbacks and resistance from preservation groups, construction did not begin until 1982.

=== Hahn Company (1985–1998) ===
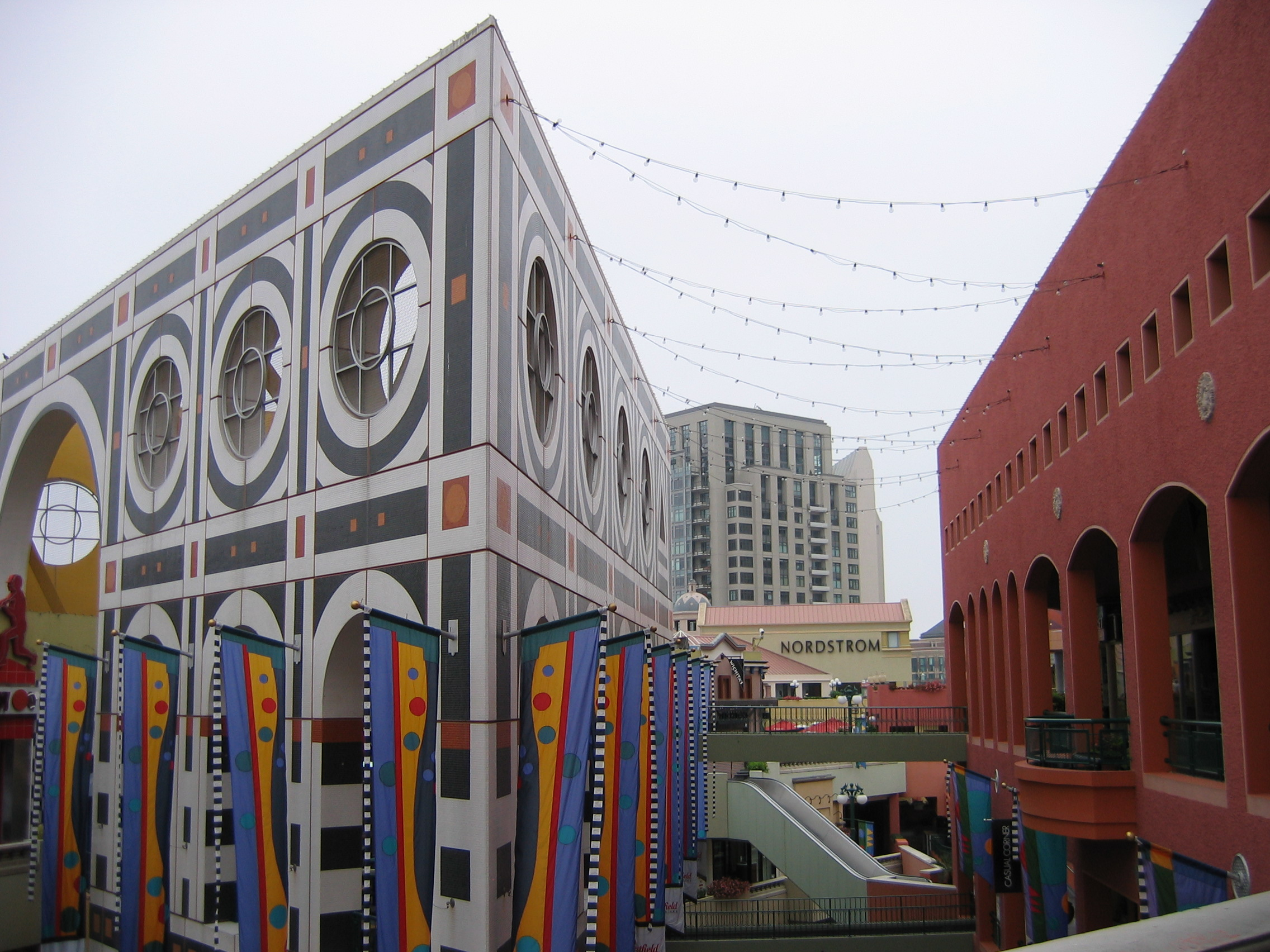
Palazzo Building (2004)

Horton Plaza was the $140 million centerpiece of a downtown redevelopment project run by The Hahn Company; architect Jon Jerde opened his practice, the Jerde Partnership, after Hahn awarded the commission to him in 1977. It was the first example of his so-called "experience architecture", opening on August 9, 1985, and led to numerous similar commissions.

Horton Plaza was an instant financial success and while some credited it for revitalizing downtown San Diego, others said the revitalization benefitted the mall. A gala held the night before the opening drew 7,000, who each paid US$50 per ticket; the opening ceremonies, attended by a crowd estimated at 35,000, included a show by Philippe Petit.

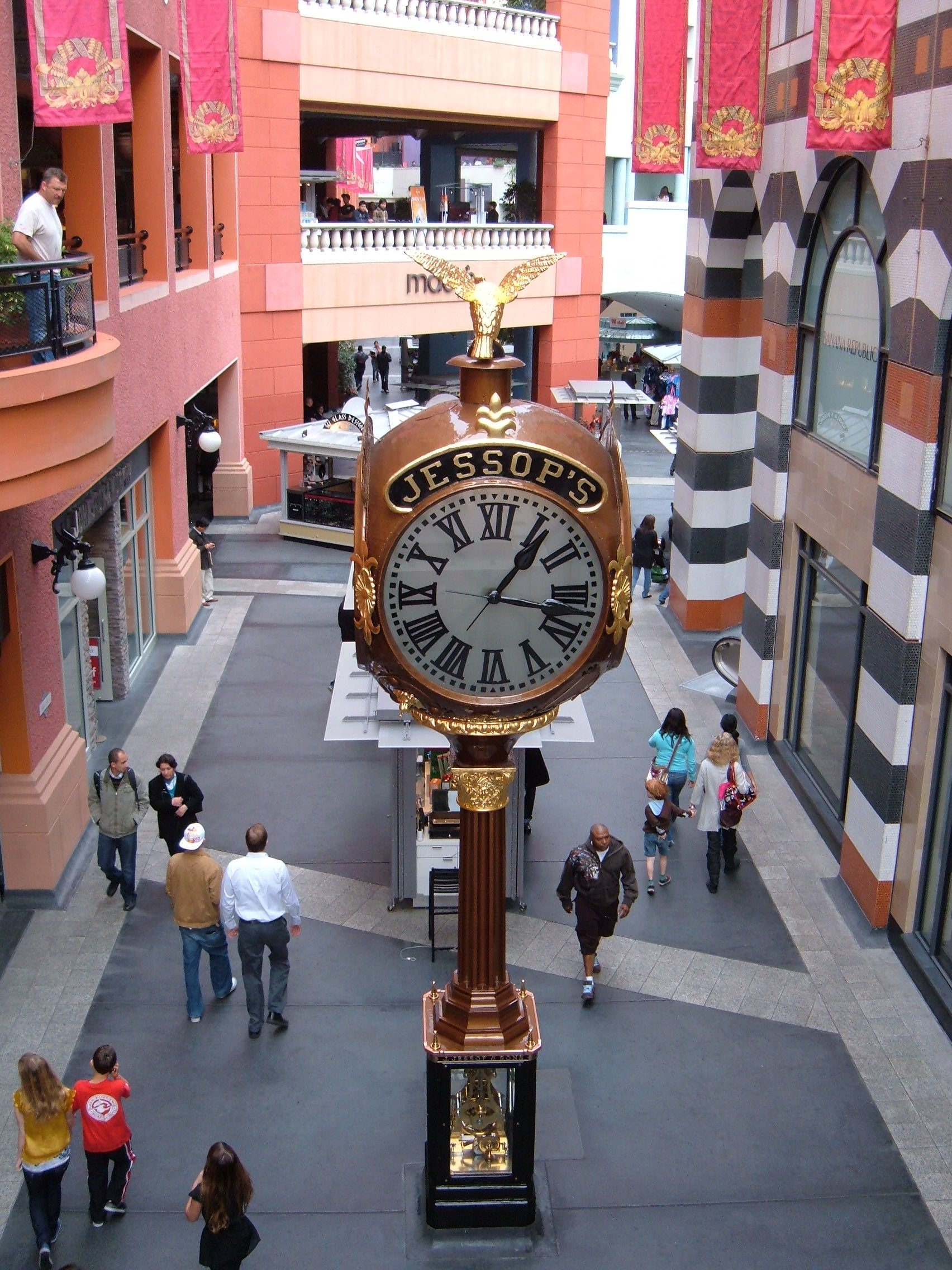
Jessop's Clock in Horton Plaza (2009)

When it opened, the center housed the historic Jessop's Clock, built in 1907, which formerly stood on a sidewalk in front of the Jessop and Sons jewelry store in downtown San Diego.

Weeks after the mall's opening in 1985, a man died by suicide after jumping from a third-story walkway in what was the first of five suicides to occur over the mall's history.

In its first year of operation, 25–30 million people visited the shopping center, compared to 10 million contemporaneous visitors to Disneyland. By 1988, it was the third-most visited destination in San Diego, after the Zoo and SeaWorld. However, as early as 1987, continued retail success was being questioned by consultants, who noted that by becoming known primarily as a tourist attraction, foot traffic seemed to be tourists and "people with cameras are not shoppers. They may stop and buy lunch, but they're not going to buy a suit." Food and entertainment accounted for 30% of sales, compared with 10% at typical malls.

In 1994, Sam Goody and Planet Hollywood announced they would be opening stores in the former J. W. Robinson's site in 1995. In 1995, United Artists Theatres announced they would be doubling the existing 7-screen cinema to 14 in 1996.

In 1997, FAO Schwarz opened on the 5th floor of the mall.

=== Westfield (1998–2018) ===
In 1998, the owners of the mall sold it to the Westfield Group, which renamed the mall Westfield Horton Plaza. In 2014, Westfield split into two companies, Scentre Group for Australia and New Zealand malls, and Westfield Corporation for American and European malls. In 2018, Westfield Corporation was acquired by Unibail-Rodamco, and it was rebranded as Unibail-Rodamco-Westfield.

Planet Hollywood closed in 2001.

In 2003, FAO Schwarz closed. It was replaced by Samba Grille, a Brazilian steakhouse in early 2006. Samba Grille closed in fall 2007 and it since then replaced with an antique furniture gallery/store in 2008.

In 2006, Mervyn's announced they would be closing early that year. Express was replaced with Steve & Barry’s sportswear which operated until 2009. The upper level of the former Mervyn's was replaced with a variety of stores such as Forever 21 and Express in 2007.

The Musicland Group filed for Chapter 11 bankruptcy in January 2006, and in February it announced the closing of 226 Sam Goody and 115 Suncoast Motion Picture Company stores and all Media Play locations.

Demolition of Robinson's at Horton Plaza

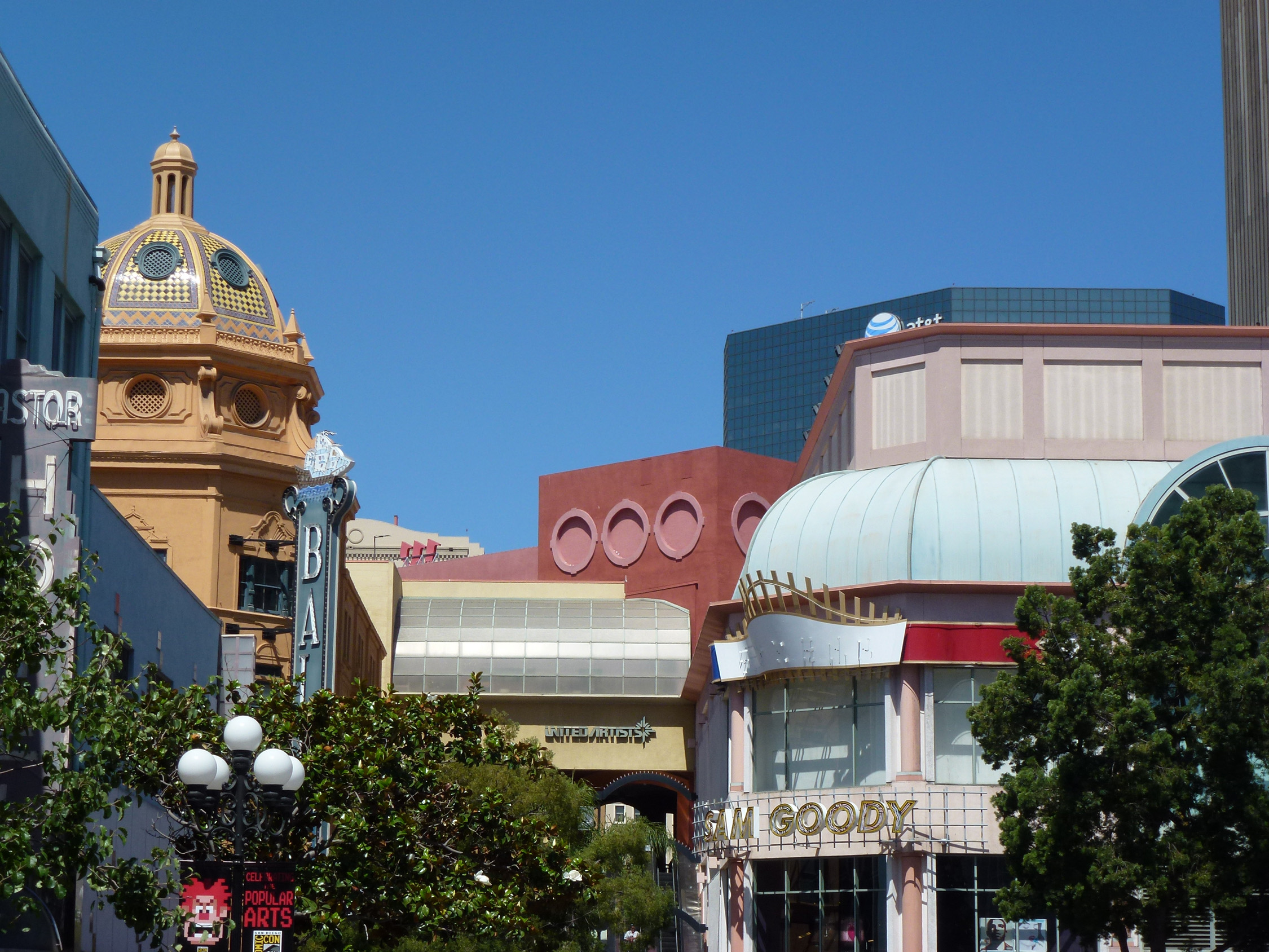
2012

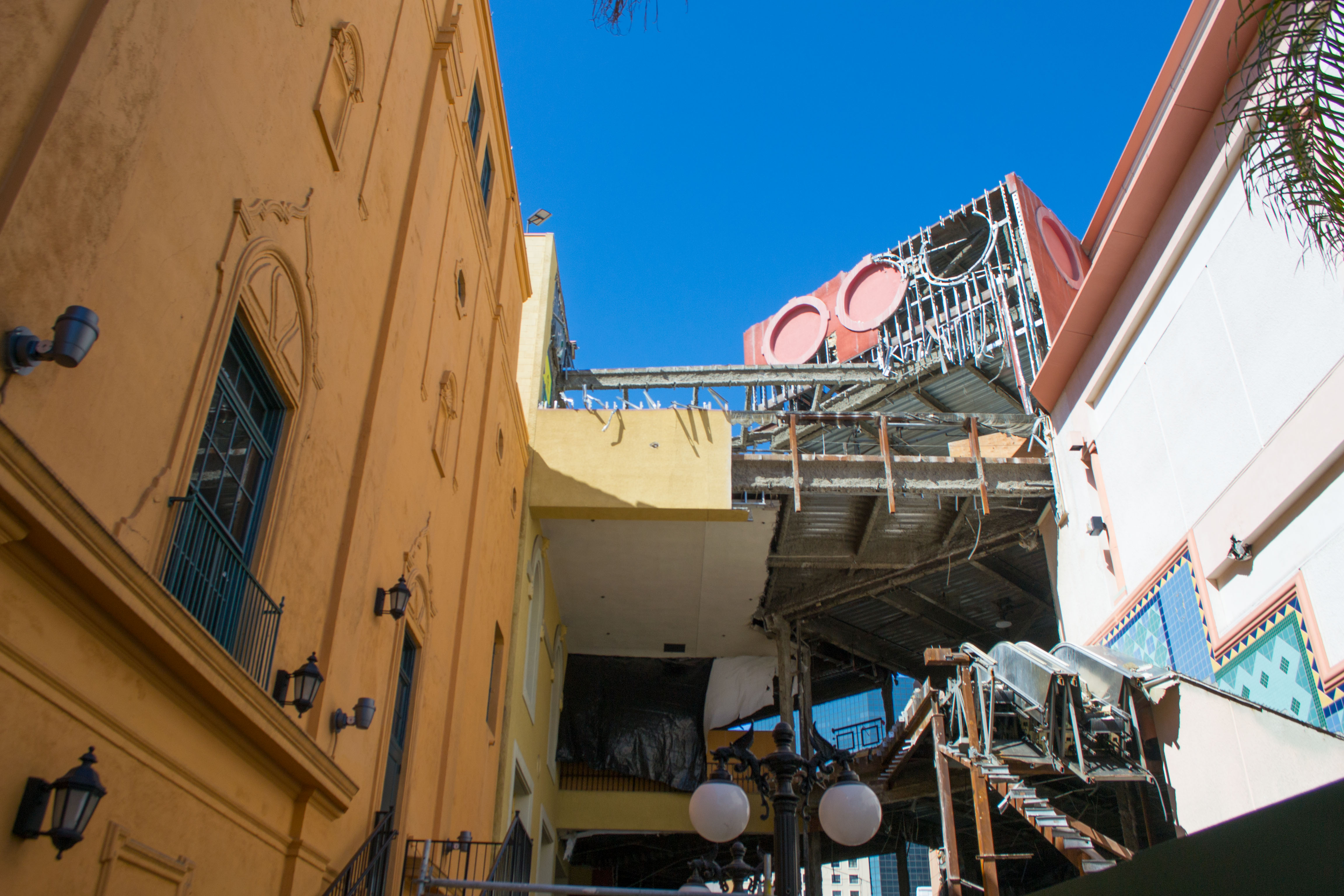
2013

viewed west from Fourth and E; Balboa Theatre on left

On January 11, 2011, the San Diego City Council unanimously approved a plan to raze the former Robinsons-May building on the north side of the mall to make way for a 37,000 square feet (3,400 m^{2}) urban park, effectively enlarging the adjacent, historic Horton Plaza and Broadway Fountain. Westfield partnered with the city to renovate and restore the area into an urban park and public gathering place called Horton Plaza Park. Westfield agreed to operate the park and schedule events, which could include concerts, movie screenings, and celebrations. Horton Plaza Park will have a 53,000 square-foot venue, a Cabrillo Theater, an interactive pop-jet fountain, and 23-foot-tall color-changing statues. The new Horton Plaza Park had its grand opening on May 4, 2016.

In 2012, FYE announced it would be closing its Sam Goody flagship store at Horton Plaza on October 31. That year, Regal Entertainment Group announced would be downsizing from 14 screens to 8.

In 2012, Westfield said it would not renew the lease on the Jessop's Clock and gave its owners (descendants of the clock's builder, Joseph Jessop) six months to find a new location for it. However, the heirs had trouble finding an appropriate location, and in 2019 the clock was placed in storage.

In 2013, armed police descended on the mall after receiving a tip that fugitive Christopher Dorner was spotted in the mall. One man was arrested by police, though it later was revealed to be a case of mistaken identity.

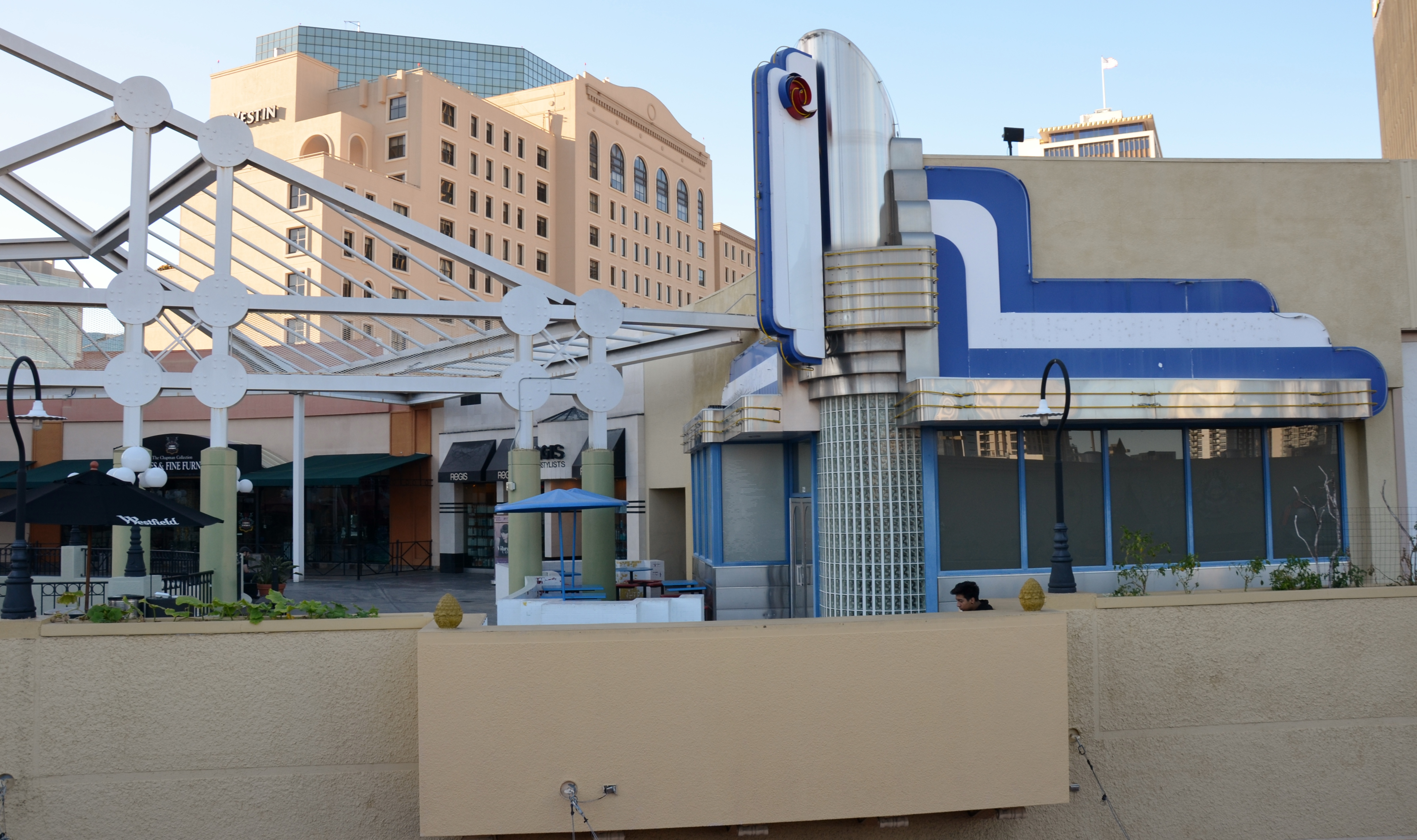
This diner-themed restaurant space was occupied originally by a Marie Callender's and then a McDonald's; it was vacant by 2015.

On June 24, 2016, Nordstrom announced it would close on August 26, 2016, leaving one anchor left in the mall.

On November 22, 2016, a local woman who had previously been reported as suicidal shot herself in the middle of the crowded mall after leading police on a chase.

In July 2017, a shooting occurred at the mall in which an active-duty Navy personnel was killed and his cousin wounded after getting into a confrontation with another man. Just three days after this incident, another man died by suicide after jumping from the plaza's balcony in an unrelated incident.

=== Stockdale Capital Partners (2018–2025) ===
In August 2018, the complex was sold to Stockdale Capital Partners for US$175 million, which planned to develop it into The Campus at Horton, an office and retail complex, at an estimated cost of US$275 M. They proposed an "innovation hub" focusing on technology and biotechnology companies, while retaining some retail, food and beverage, and entertainment offerings. They hoped to begin construction in 2019 with a completion date of fall 2020. The proposed redevelopment came under fire from architecture preservationists, who worked to corral votes to persuade city leaders to declare Horton Plaza a historic building.

Most of the center was closed; the few remaining retailers included Banana Republic and Victoria's Secret. The Regal cinemas in the complex, which opened in 1985, closed in February 2019. In April 2019, Jessop's Clock was dismantled and moved into temporary storage while it awaited a lease to be signed for its new location. The San Diego City Council approved a land use exemption unanimously on May 20, 2019, which allowed Stockdale to proceed with its plan by reducing the required amount of retail space at the site. By the summer of 2019, almost all of the stores in the mall were closed leaving only Macy's and 24 Hour Fitness still operating; Macy's filed a lawsuit against Stockdale in October 2019, seeking to delay or halt the demolition, claiming those plans violated its lease agreement.

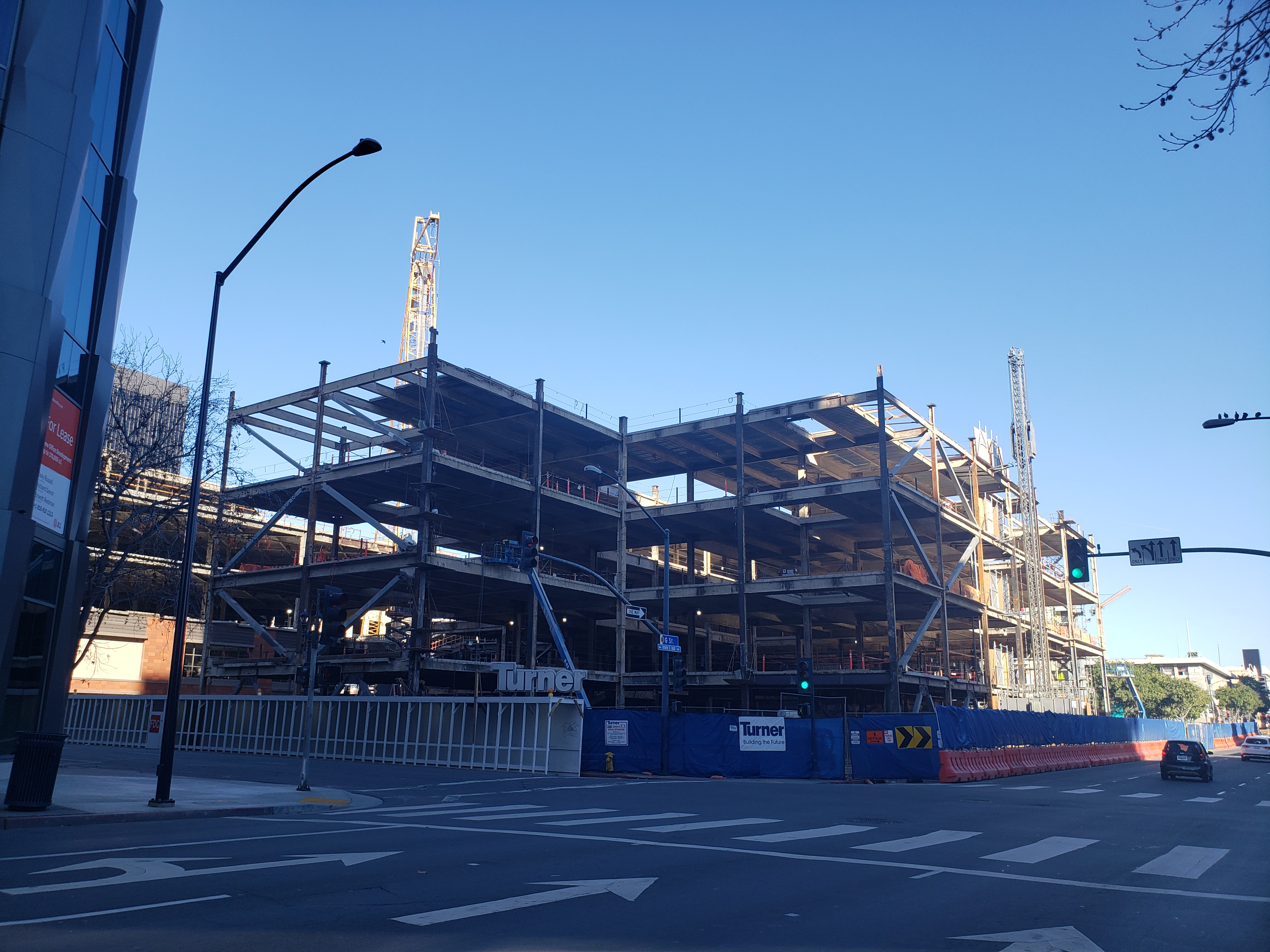
Former Nordstrom anchor at First and G, gutted for rebuilding (2021)

In January 2020, Stockdale Capital Partners announced it had reached an agreement with Macy's to close their store as part of a plan to close 125 stores nationwide, allowing redevelopment of the mall to move forward. Stockdale secured a US$330 million loan to fund the first phase of the conversion in March 2020. Macy's closed in April 2020. Despite news reports in 2020 that Horton Plaza was "fenced off and began demolition", in fact an adaptive reuse project had begun to transform the site into "The Campus at Horton", retaining approximately 60% of the original building materials and structural steel, and adding more modern insulation and mechanical systems. When complete, The Campus will have 772,000 ft^{2} (71,700 m^{2}) of office space and 300,000 ft^{2} (28,000 m^{2}) of ground-level retail space, compared to approximately 600,000 ft^{2} (56,000 m^{2}) of retail space with its original configuration as a shopping center. A representative for Stockdale noted the property would be "reconnected to downtown. When you go from a fortress-like retail center ... and you remove all of those bridges and barriers that actually separated it from the community, ... this property returns to being part of downtown."

Phase 1 completion is expected in late 2023. Preliminary work included removal of the pathways and bridges connecting the two sides of Jerde's diagonal "armature", leaving a clear view from end to end. This phase renovates and expands the former Nordstrom and Mervyn's buildings on the southwest and west ends, respectively. The former Nordstrom, now known as Building A, will have 389,000 ft^{2} (36,100 m^{2}) of space for life science tenants on 10 floors, expanded from five floors as originally completed. The former Mervyn's will have 205,000 ft^{2} (19,000 m^{2}) of office space and 51,000 ft^{2} (4,700 m^{2}) of retail space. Phase 2 will be completed at an undetermined date, and encompasses the former Macy's and cinema spaces.

Alliance Bernstein (August 2025 - Present)

In August 2025, the mall was foreclosed on by its Lender, Alliance Bernstein. This was due to the fact that the initial tenants that planned to occupy the building had pulled out. Initially the tenant was supposedly a biotech firm, but was unnamed. There were also plans for a grocery store, retail, dining, a high rise housing tower, and performing arts spaces as the building held the Lyceum theater. The initial tenants pulled out when the COVID-19 pandemic occurred and many people were working from home, which reduced the need for commercial office space. Later, the City of San Diego planned to lease a portion of the space as a temporary location for its city hall, during its planned San Diego Concourse Redevelopment. However, the city cancelled the redevelopment project when the $250 million budget cuts occurred in 2025. As the result, the lender called in the loan and foreclosed on the property on August 18, 2025.

The former mall turned office complex found no buyers at the foreclosure auction, so Alliance Bernstein, the lender took back ownership and control of the property. It is now unclear whether they will try to sell it, find tenants for it, demolish it or repurpose it. Currently, as of November 2025, the former mall converted to an office complex is vacant and is not being used for anything other than a pay parking garage.
