= Horton Plaza Park =

Urban park in San Diego, California

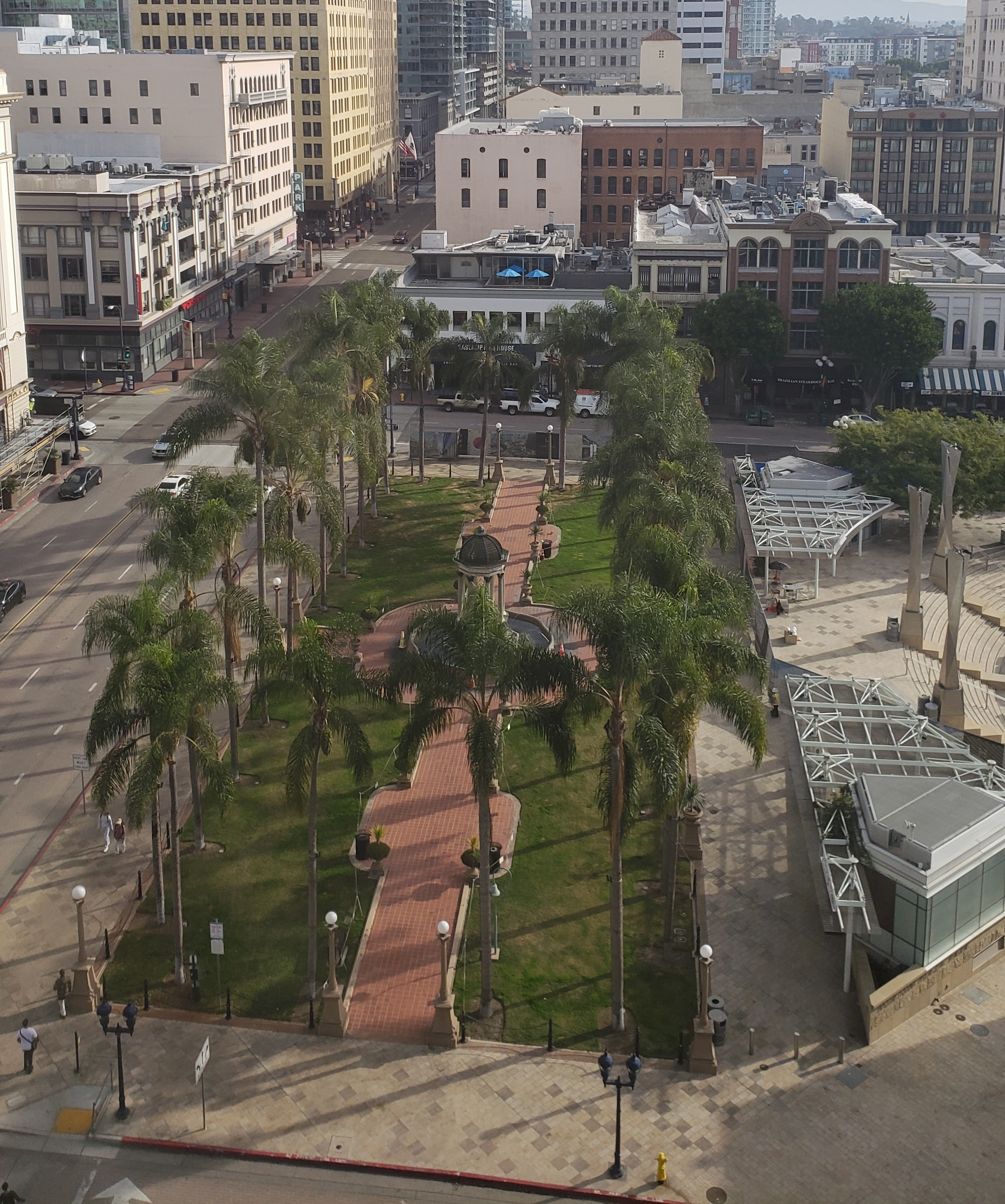
- Plaza and fountain from above

- Location within San Diego Location within California Location within the United States
- Type: Urban park
- Location: San Diego, California, U.S.
- Coordinates: 32°42′55″N 117°09′41″W
- Area: 1.2 acres (0.0049 km^{2})
- Created: 1910
- Owner: City of San Diego
- Operator: Westfield

Horton Plaza Park is an outdoor plaza in downtown San Diego, California. It includes an amphitheater, retail stores, and a fountain. It is located on the corner of 4th Avenue and Broadway.

The city-owned plaza opened in 1910. It was designed by landscape architect Walker Macy and built by Civic San Diego. The plaza was designated a historical landmark by the City of San Diego on March 19, 1971.

== Geography ==
The plaza is bordered to the north by Broadway Ave and the U.S. Grant Hotel, former site of the Horton House Hotel. Flanking the east and west are 4th and 3rd Avenues, respectively. Immediately to the south is the site of the former Horton Plaza shopping mall.

== History ==
=== 1890 – 1960 ===
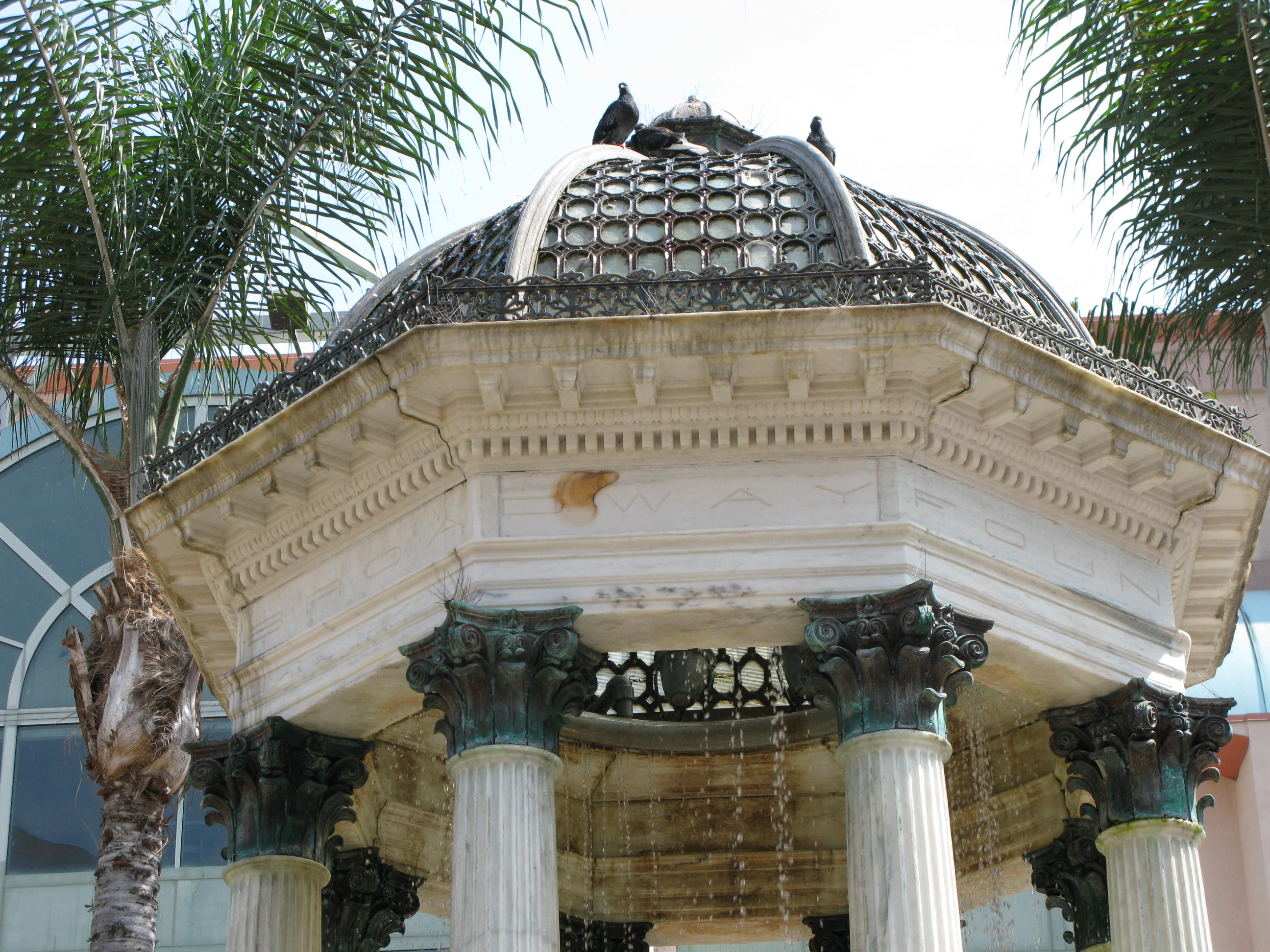
The fountain's cupola with a portion of the engraved frieze visible.

The area of the park was sold to the City of San Diego in 1895 by its namesake, Alonzo Horton. Originally, the plaza was intended for use by his guests staying at the Horton House Hotel. In 1909, the plaza was chosen as the site of a "weather kiosk" provided by the U.S. Weather Bureau. Park commissioners laid out the plaza in harmony with the lines of the kiosk, according to one source, reserving the center for a fountain. Louis J. Wilde, banker and part-owner of the U. S. Grant Hotel, donated funds to help build a fountain located in the center of the Park. Irving J. Gill designed the Broadway Fountain, which was completed in 1910.

In 1923, a commemorative highway milestone honoring Confederate general Robert E. Lee was erected with "much fanfare" and the support of many civic leaders following the completion of the transcontinental Lee Highway. The parks commission originally opposed the milestone but were overruled by Mayor John L. Bacon. President Calvin Coolidge was reported to have pushed a button in his Oval Office all the way in Washington, D.C. that rang a gong in Horton Plaza. "Colonel" Ed Fletcher presided over the ceremonies.

In 1926, a plaque commemorating the western terminus of the Jefferson Davis Highway was installed in Horton Plaza. Local attorney W. Jefferson, a distant relative, underwrote the granite block holding the plaque. It has since been moved to the western sidewalk of the plaza following the 2016 renovation. A Union veterans group opposed the tribute to the president of the Confederate States of America and it was removed later that year, but it was put back in 1985 as part of the rehabilitation of the park coinciding with the building of Horton Plaza Mall.

=== 1960 – 1970s ===
Throughout the years, Horton Plaza Park was the backdrop for many notable events. On November 2, 1960, then-Senator John F. Kennedy spoke at Horton Plaza to make a last-minute appeal for votes just six days before the 1960 Presidential Election. On March 19, 1971, the City of San Diego designated the plaza as a historical landmark.

=== 2010 - present ===
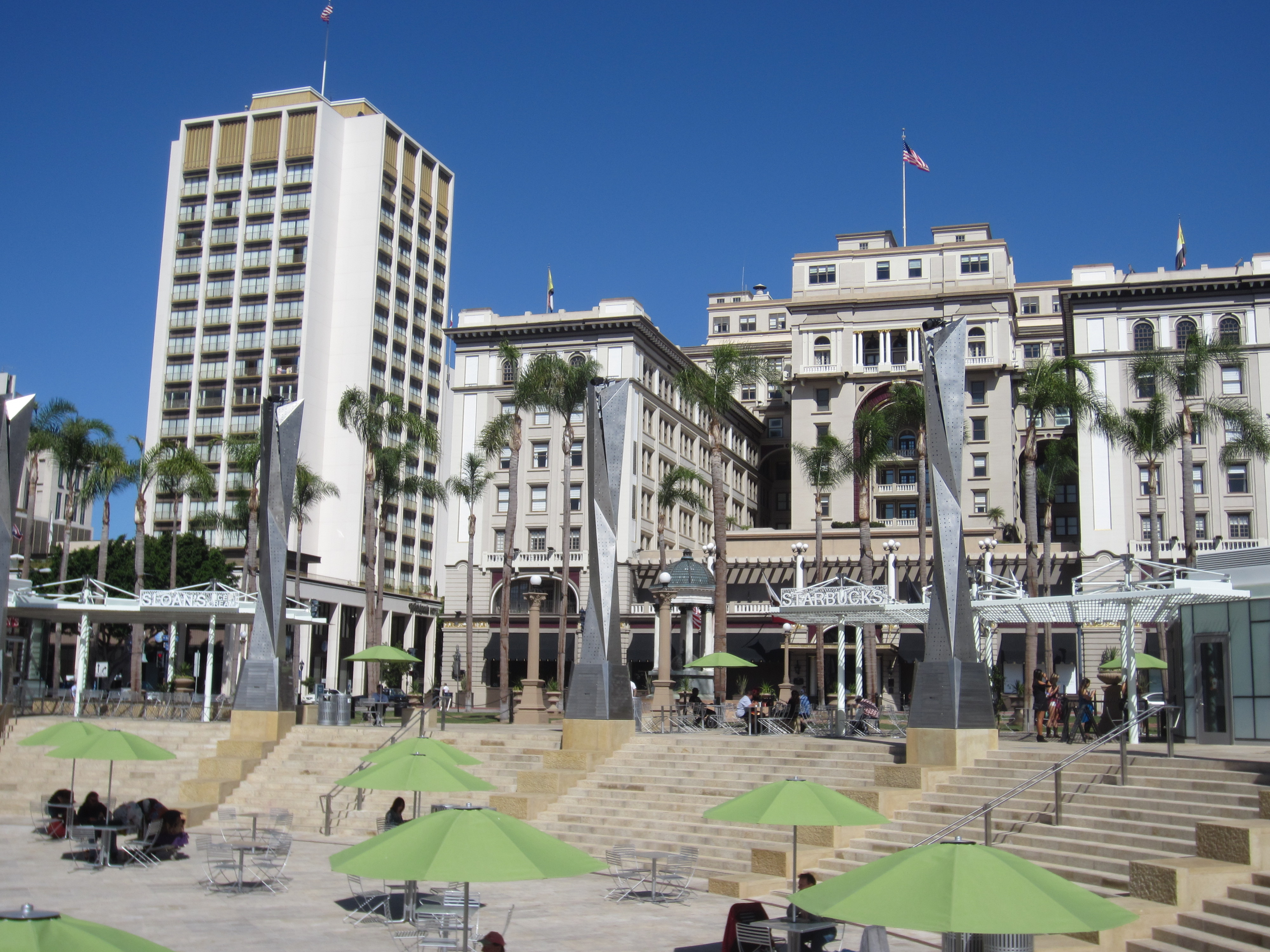
The park in 2016

In 2011, the San Diego City Council unanimously voted to approve a unique public-private partnership between Westfield and the City of San Diego. This plan involved Westfield demolishing the former Robinsons-May and Planet Hollywood building at Westfield Horton Plaza Shopping Center and transferring the land to the city. The operators of the adjacent Westfield Horton Plaza shopping center partnered with the city in the renovation.

The overall project aims to restore the historic Horton Plaza Park and fountain, re-establishing it as the regional treasure that it was in the early-to-mid 1900s. The aim was for the plaza to host scheduled events such as concerts, movie screenings, and celebrations. The park opened in May 2016.

On August 16, 2017, following the Charlottesville terror attack in Virginia, the San Diego City Council removed the Jefferson Davis plaque. On June 12, 2020, following the Black Lives Matter outcry after the murder of George Floyd, the Robert E. Lee monument was quietly removed.

== Fountain ==
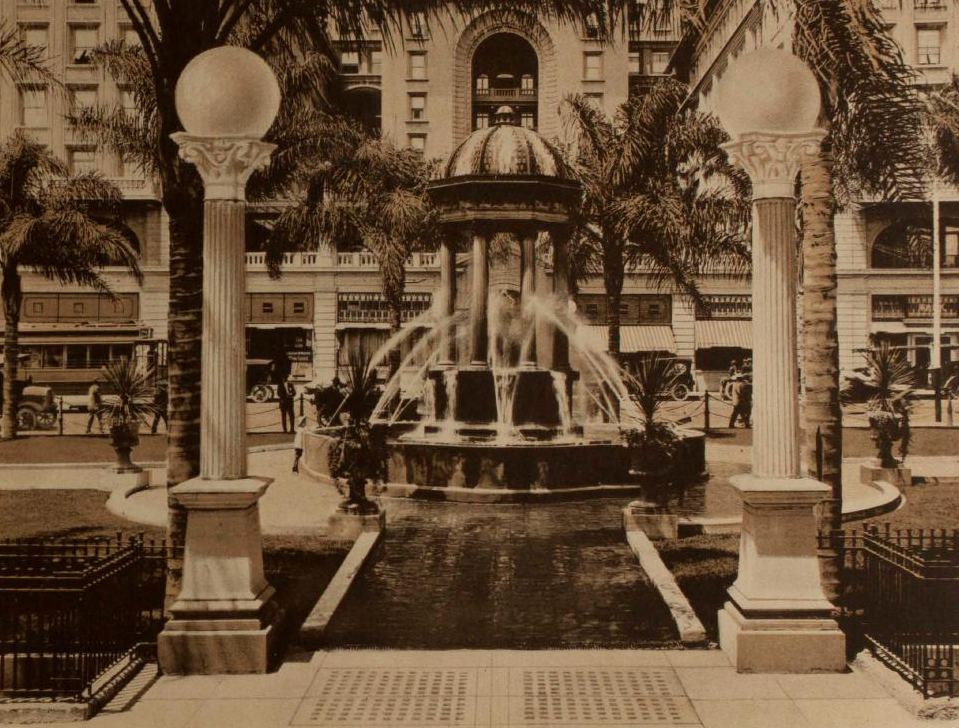
Fountain in 1915

The fountain in the middle of the plaza was designed by Irving Gill, which he modeled after the Choragic Monument of Lysicrates. Louis J. Wilde, banker and part-owner of the U. S. Grant Hotel, donated $10,000 to help build the fountain, which was completed in 1910. Initially titled the L. J. Wilde Electric Fountain, it quickly came to be known as simply the Electric Fountain before falling into obscurity. After restoration, the fountain is most often referred to as the Broadway Fountain after the engraving on its frieze, which reads "Broadway Fountain for the People."

Cold weather in January 1913 caused the water in the fountain to freeze, an event rare in the region. San Diegans visited the fountain and stood on the thick ice.

The restored Gill fountain is the centerpiece of the plaza, which also has an amphitheater, an interactive pop-jet fountain, and light sculptures.

== Amenities ==
Spanning over 53,000 square feet (4,900 m^{2}), Horton Plaza Park is composed of three sections: South Plaza, Amphitheater, and Historic Park. Included in the plaza are granite finishes, an interactive pop-jet fountain and 8 Luminaries (23-foot-tall [7.0 m] color-changing light sculptures). There are three food and beverage Pavilions located at Horton Plaza Park including Starbucks and Sloan's Ice Cream. Each Pavilion has adjacent patio seating covered by a trellised overhang.

A booth selling tickets to local attractions is operated by the San Diego Performing Arts League. Park events include ongoing entertainment and game series.

== See also ==
- List of parks in San Diego
- List of San Diego Historic Landmarks
- List of Confederate monuments and memorials
