= Oceanside Museum of Art =

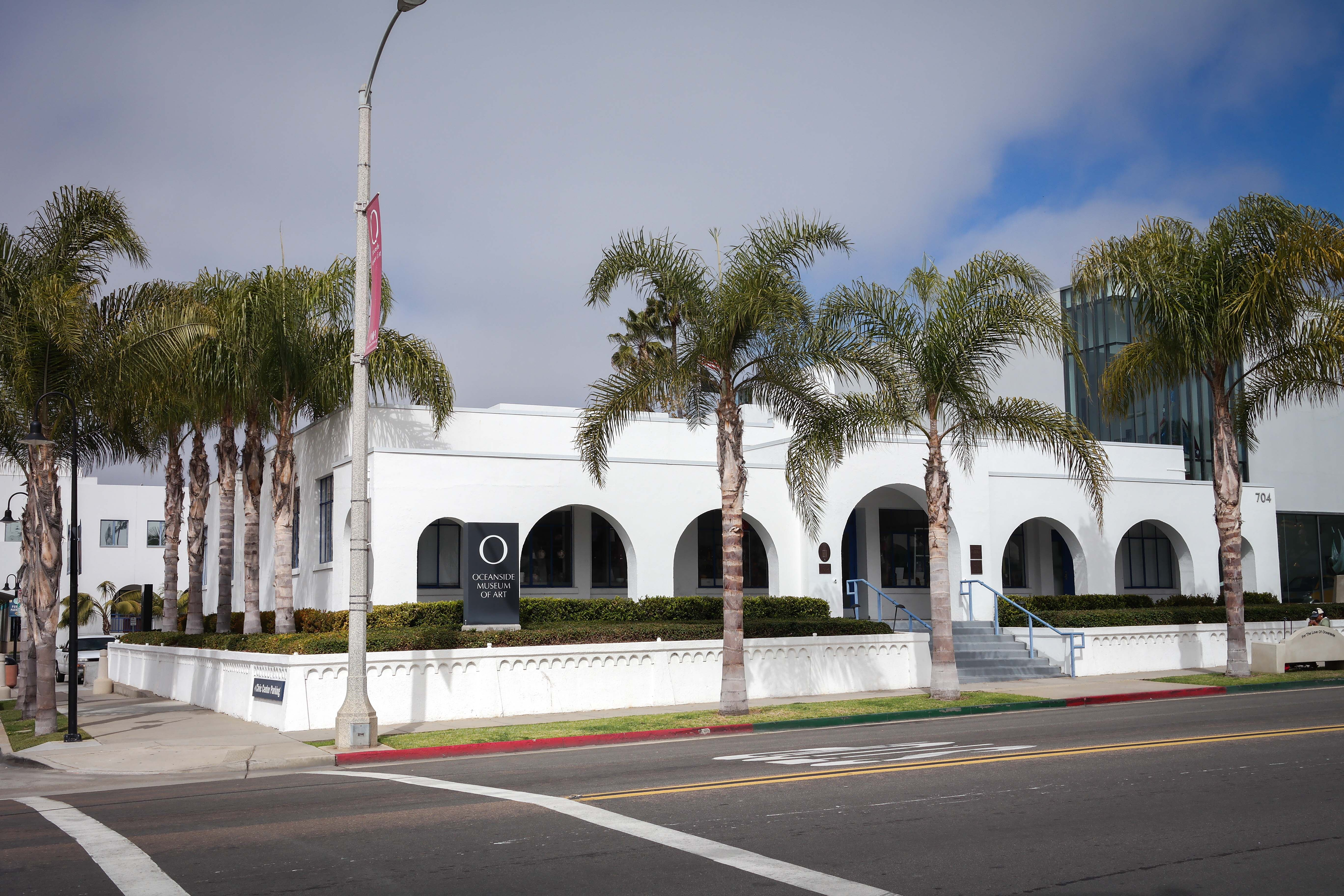
- Old City Hall, Oceanside, CA, home of the Oceanside Museum of Art
- Established: 1997
- Location: 704 Pier View Way; Oceanside, California
- Coordinates: 33.198302°N 117.378655°W
- Type: Contemporary art museum
- Website: http://oma-online.org/

Oceanside Museum of Art is a fine arts museum in Oceanside, California. It began holding exhibits in 1995, with a dedicated facility opening on October 6, 1997. The museum is housed in two buildings designed by Irving Gill and Frederick Fisher, modernist architects from Southern California.

The museum houses art focused on works by contemporary artists of Southern California. Works exhibited include paintings, sculptures, furniture, art quilts and fiber designs, and glass. The museum also hosts or sponsors classes, lectures, tours, concerts, films, events, and chartered travel to other cultural art exhibits.

The 20,020 square foot facility includes 9,128 square feet of gallery space. It typically features over a dozen modern and contemporary art exhibitions each year, including exhibits at other community locations. The museum attracts 25,000 visitors each year, including 4,000 students who participate in programs.

== Exhibits and activities ==
In 2014, special exhibitions included "Spitting in the Wind," a collection of works by four contemporary artists, John Baldessari, Richard Allen Morris, Robert Matheny and the late Russell Baldwin.

In 2015, the museum housed over 100 works of art from "Project PAINT: The Prison Arts INiTiative", an arts program providing prisoners with a safe opportunity to explore and express themselves. The curator remarked that arts programs reduce violence in prisons and lower the number of returning prisoners.

In 2015, James F. Peck was named the executive director of the museum, succeeding Daniel Foster.

In 2016, the museum was awarded a $150,000 grant from the James Irvine Foundation to endow a series of interactive and public artist-in-residence programs at a variety of locations in San Diego County. From June 25 to October 29, 2016 the museum exhibit "California Fibers: Eclectic Threads" features "two-dimensional and three-dimensional pieces of fiber and textile arts in media such as silk, cotton, bamboo, palm, wool wire and paper using techniques including weaving, basketry, quilting, embroidery and felting."
