= Kurt Meyer (architect) =

American architect

Kurt Werner Meyer
- Born: June 3, 1922; Zurich, Switzerland
- Died: August 18, 2014 (aged 92); Los Angeles, California
- Occupation: Architect
- Spouses: Rosemary Kretz (m. 1948; div. 1971) Rosalie Wallace (m. 1981; div. 1991) Pamela Deuel-Meyer (m. 1996)

Kurt Werner Meyer (June 3, 1922 – August 18, 2014) was a Swiss-born American architect active from 1948 to 1993. Working primarily in the Los Angeles area, Meyer is known for numerous financial institutions, educational building, civic buildings, and civic service.

== Career ==
Born in 1922, Meyer received his Bachelor of Architecture from the Swiss Federal Institute of Technology in Zurich (ETH-Zurich) in 1946. He immigrated to the United States in 1948 made his way to Los Angeles in 1949 and worked as a junior draftsman for the Bechtel Corporation. In 1955, he became a licensed architect and started a new job at Kistner, Wright & Wright (KWW). In 1957 with the blessing of KWW he took the commission for Death Valley High School and started his own firm Cox, Hagman & Meyer.

In 1957 a commission to remodel the storefront office of Canoga Park Savings led to many more commissions for financial institutions. The remodel was the start of Bart Lytton’s plan to remake Canoga Park Savings into Lytton Savings & Loan. In 1958 Kurt Meyer was awarded commission for the Lytton Savings & Loan’s new Hollywood Home Office Branch at the eastern end of the Sunset Strip.

On July 1st, 1960 Hollywood Lytton Savings opened, it features a zig-zagged prefabricated reinforced concrete roof. The building is unique for its mix of Mid‐Century Modern, Googie features and the New Formalist style. Meyer designed a total of five banks for Lytton Savings.

Meyer designed approximately 20 financial buildings in Southern California and Washington. For Mark Taper, president of American Savings & Loan, he designed 35 projects.

From 1967 to 1975 Meyer opened an additional architecture office on the island of Guam.

In 1988 Meyer joined with Clifton Allen and the name of Kurt Meyer and Associates changed to Meyer & Allen Associates. In 1992 Meyer retired from architecture and sold the firm to Allen.

== Architecture conservation and preservation ==
In 1967 Bart Lytton, though Lytton Savings, purchased the Irving Gill designed Dodge House in West Hollywood. Lytton had Meyer design a multi-family condominium project on the grounds of the Dodge house to preserve the mansion. Built in 1916 the Dodge House was considered a modern architectural masterpiece. In 1970 Lytton lost control of his Savings & Loan, the Dodge House was sold and demolished. On learning of the demolition, Meyer, who had fought for seven years to save the house, said, "This is like slashing a Rembrandt with a razor."

In 1978, 8 years after the Dodge House demolition Meyer helped form the Los Angeles Conservancy. The Conservancy's founding president called Meyer "a passionate advocate for great architecture in Los Angeles"

During his years on the CRA Meyer kept the city of Los Angeles from selling the Central Library for its land value. He continued to be an advocate for the landmarked building through the 1980s as president of the Urban Design Advisory Coalition.

== Community Redevelopment Agency ==
In 1973 Meyer was appointed to the board of the Los Angeles Community Redevelopment Agency (CRA) by Mayor Tom Bradley and would become chairman of the board in 1976. Under his leadership, the affordable Japanese Village Plaza was created in Japanese character; Angeles Plaza, Bunker Hill housing for elderly and low-income elderly was constructed; and the jewelry industry was kept from moving away from downtown.

Meyer was Director of the Southern California Chapter of American Institute of Architects (AIA) (1968–1971), and chairman of the board of the Southern California Institute of Architects (SCI-Arc) (1987–1988).

Meyer was a member of the Los Angeles Goals Council (1965), board member of Hollywood YMCA, Director of Southern California Chapter of American Institute of Architects (AIA) (1968–1971), and an elected Fellow of the Explorers’ Club (1990).

== Himalayas ==
In 1992, Meyer retired from architecture to start a new career.

With his wife, Pamela Deuel, he explored the remote villages of the jungle lowlands of Nepal over a nine-year period starting in 1993. From this period of exploration Meyer and Duel wrote A Rural Folk Art Version told by the Dangaura Tharu people of Jalaura Dang Valley, Nepal in 1998, Mahabharata: The Tharu Barka Naach in 1999, and In the Shadow of the Himalayas: Tibet – Bhutan – Nepal – Sikkim A Photographic Record by John Claude White 1883–1908 in 2006.

The main project of this period was to be a book of Kurt Meyer's photography of the artistic Tharu tribe, it has yet to be completed.

== Buildings ==
Selected works

- 1957: Canoga Park Savings (became Lytton Savings), Canoga Park (Los Angeles), CA
- 1958: Death Valley Academy, Old State Highway 127, Shoshone, CA 92384
- 1960: Lytton Savings & Loan Headquarters, 8150 Sunset Blvd, Los Angeles, CA. In December Lytton Savings became a protected Los Angeles designated Historic-Cultural Monument. In May 2021, the building was demolished to make way for a mixed-use development designed by architect Frank Gehry. As of 2023, the site is still empty.
- 1964: Pomona regional office of Lytton Savings, 300 W. Second St., Pomona 91766
- 1964: Lytton Oakland branch, 5050 Broadway, Oakland, CA
- 1964–65: Residence in Los Cerritos, Long Beach, California
- 1965: American Savings and Loan, 15725 Whittier Blvd, Whittier, CA
- 1965: Brentwood Savings and Loan, 12001 San Vincente, Brentwood (Los Angeles), CA
- 1966: Canoga Park Branch of Lytton Savings, 6633 Topanga Canyon Blvd, Canoga Park (Los Angeles), CA
- 1966: Lytton temporary branch, Wilshire and Hobart. Demolished
- 1966: Fisherman & Merchants Savings and Loan, 29000 S Western Ave, Rancho Palos Verdes, CA
- 1966: Liberty Savings and Loan, 1180 S Beverly, Los Angeles, CA
- 1967: The School for Nursery Years (The Center for Early Education), 563 N. Alfred St, West Hollywood, CA
- 1968: Mt. Washington Elementary School, Los Angeles, CA
- 1968: Safety Savings and Loan, 4333 Wilshire Blvd (at Plymouth), Los Angeles, CA
- 1969: Dodge House rescue plan condos (unbuilt), West Hollywood, CA
- 1969: Office Building-The Carter Co, 425 S. Shatto Place, Los Angeles, CA
- 1969: Guam-Daikyo Hotel, Aganya, Guam
- 1970s: Palomar Savings and Loan Association, 260 West Grand Ave, Escondido, CA 92025
- 1970s: Savings & Loan Longview Wash, 1265 14th Ave. Longview, WA
- 1975: Huntington Beach Civic Center, 2000 Main St. Huntington Beach, CA
- 1976: Century Federal Savings and Loan, 501 Santa Monica Blvd, Santa Monica, CA
- 1976: Cal State Fresno State Science Building, 600 E. San Ramon Fresno, CA
- 1977: Meyer + Allen Architects offices, Los Angeles, California
- 1977: Maple Drive Condominiums, 320 N Maple Dr Beverly Hills, CA
- 1977: Korean Exchange Bank (now Hanmi Bank), (with Kuo Sang Kim), 3099 W. Olympic Blvd, Los Angeles, CA
- 1980s: Fuller Theological Seminary Psychology building and meditation chapel, 135 N. Oakland, Pasadena, CA
- 1981: Glendale Schools Credit Union, 1800 Broadview Dr, Glendale 91208
- 1982: Plaza de la Raza Hispanic Cultural Center, 3540 N. Mission Rd, Los Angeles, CA
- 1983: Exxon Western Regional Headquarters, West Hillcrest Drive, Thousand Oaks, CA
- 1985: San Bernardino County Government Center, 385 N. Arrowhead Dr, San Bernardino, CA
- 1986: Glendale Federal Savings and Loan, 472 S. Mills, Ventura, CA
- 1987: Janss Village Car Wash, 467 N. Moorpark, Thousand Oaks, CA
- 1987: Lockheed Federal Employees Credit Union, 2340 Hollywood Way, Burbank, CA
- 1988: San Bernardino County Sheriff’s HQ, 655 East Third St, San Bernardino, CA
- 1990: UCLA 300 Medical Plaza building, Los Angeles, CA
- 1992: South Coast AQMD, 21865 Copley Dr, Diamond Bar, CA
- 1992:University of Redlands Campus Center/Master Plan, Redlands, CA

== Awards and honors ==
- American Institute of Architects College of Fellows (FAIA) 1973
- Los Angeles Chamber of Commerce Lifetime Achievement Award (1992)
- California Council of the AIA Public Service Award (1992)
- Los Angeles Conservancy Modern Master 2013

== Personal life ==
Kurt Meyer was born and raised in Zürich. He had three children with his first wife, Rosemary Kretz Meyer: Susanne Meyer Christopher (1952), Randy Meyer (1955), and Richard Meyer (1956).

== Sources ==
- Wuellner, Margarita J.; Kainer, Amanda Y. (September 2014). "Historical Resources Assessment Report and Impacts Analysis for the Proposed 8150 Sunset Boulevard Mixed Use Project" (PDF). PCR Services Corporation.
