= Walter L. Dodge House =

Early modernist building in California

Walter Luther Dodge House
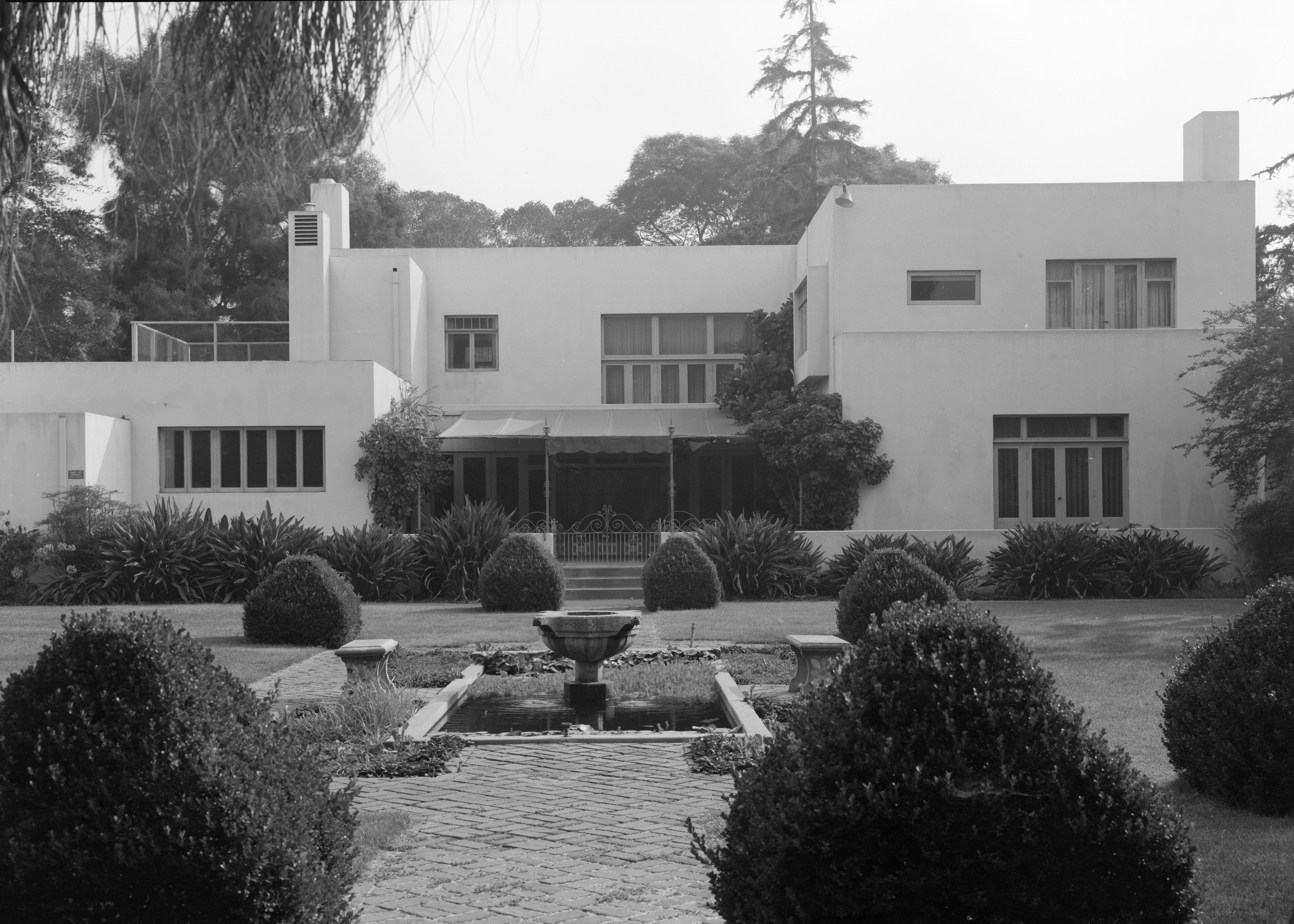

General information
- Type: Reinforced concrete
- Architectural style: Early Modern
- Location: 950 N. Kings Rd., West Hollywood, California
- Coordinates: 34.088387°N 118.370996°W
- Construction started: 1914
- Completed: 1916
- Demolished: 1970

Design and construction
- Architect: Irving Gill

Other information
- Number of rooms: 16
- Walter Luther Dodge House
- Formerly listed on the U.S. National Register of Historic Places
- NRHP reference No.: 68000058

Significant dates
- Added to NRHP: 1968
- Removed from NRHP: 1970

The Walter L. Dodge House in West Hollywood, California, was an architecturally significant home, designed by Irving Gill in the Early Modern style. Though the Dodge House received significant recognition from architectural experts, it was targeted for redevelopment. A long preservation effort to shield it from the wrecking ball ultimately failed, ending with complete demolition in 1970. The Dodge House was replaced by apartments.

American architectural historian William Jordy and the American Institute of Architects ranked it among the 15 most architecturally significant American houses.

== Design and early reaction ==
The 16-room house was designed by Gill in 1914 and built between 1914 and 1916 for Walter Luther Dodge, maker of "Tiz," a patented medicine for tired feet. The reinforced-concrete house blended Spanish Mission and Modern architectural styles. It also incorporated many technological innovations, including a kitchen-sink garbage disposal; an automatic car wash in the garage; plain, flush doors that swung on hidden hinges or slid into walls; a central vacuum cleaning system; sheet-metal doors; natural and unadorned (simply polished) wood surfaces indoors; and skylights and windows that provided for luminous sunlit interiors.

The Dodge House was considered one of Gill's finest works, "revealing a functional asymmetry whose ornament was derived solely from the studied geometry of the sharp openings in plain walls." In 1921, House Beautiful published a profile of the Dodge House by Eloise Roorbach and noted:

This house, though unmistakably Californian, nevertheless exemplifies certain bold and novel ideas in design, construction and decoration that make it notable, even in this land where originality in architecture is to be expected.... It is without ornament save that furnished by vines, for he believes beauty should be organic and that no amount of ornament can redeem a badly designed structure. There is not even an overhanging roof to break the severity of the exterior, and as may be seen in the photograph, there is a distinction, a dignity about it that is classic. Mr Gill thinks there is nothing more arrestingly beautiful than a plain wall across which move cloud shadows or a silhouette of flower, and that no carving or frescoing could more perfectly finish a doorway or window than a vine or creeper.

== History ==
=== 1920s through early 1960s ===
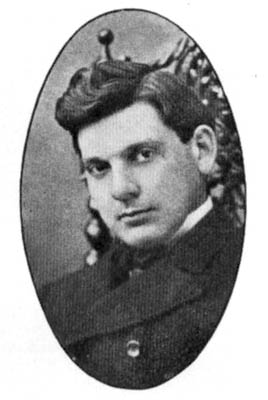
Irving J. Gill (1870–1936)

Walter Dodge used the house as his retirement home until 1924, when he sold it to T. Morrison McKenna for $125,000.

In 1939, the Los Angeles Board of Education acquired the property in a contested condemnation action, and the house was never again put to full use. The Board paid McKenna $69,000 for the property and planned to build a high school or junior high school on the site. In 1951, however, the Board determined that a school was not needed in the area. The house was used briefly from 1961 to 1962 by the Fairfax High School adult education program.

=== Preservation efforts ===
Two developments began the process toward demolition. First, in 1963, the Board of Education declared the property a "surplus." Second, the following year, the Los Angeles County Board of Supervisors rezoned the property to R-4, increasing the allowable development from eight to 200 units, making the site attractive for high-density, large apartment-building construction.

To protect the building from demolition, local residents and architects formed the "Citizens' Committee to Save the Dodge House." Esther McCoy, architectural historian was active on the committee. She produced a 1965 film, "Dodge House 1916," as part of the preservation efforts. Under pressure from this group, the Board of Education turned down an $820,000 offer in September 1965 from a bidder unwilling to pledge to save the house. The Board of Education gave the Citizens' Committee several months to arrange for the sale of the property to a public agency, or else propose another means of saving it.

Preservation efforts were stymied by public perception that, despite the opinions of architectural experts, the Dodge House was unremarkable. A writer in the Los Angeles Times noted that it could pass for a far more recent home and summed up the rationale for the public apathy toward it as follows:

In some ways, it's a house only an architect would love. Nothing noteworthy ever happened there, and it's not really old enough to claim historical status. Visually, it has neither the charm nor nostalgia of a 'period piece,' nor the spectacularly expressive design of many 'modern' residences. From the outside, it seems quite ordinary: two stories high, flat roofed, with undecorated white walls, simple rectangular metal windows, and a few arches to remind the viewer that he is in Los Angeles and not somewhere else.

In March 1966, the Board of Education sold the property to Beverly Hills financier Bart Lytton for $800,000. In May 1967, Lytton announced a $2.4 million development plan for the 2.75-acre (11,100 m^{2}) site. His scheme would have preserved the Dodge House and added on site seven separate three-story buildings, housing a total of 48 studio apartments. When Lytton's plan was announced, the Los Angeles Times headline read: "Saving of Dodge House Assured by Financier." But Lytton's plan fell apart when his business began declining. He toppled from control of his company, which the Equitable Savings & Loan Association acquired. The Times noted that, with the ouster of Lytton, the Dodge House "lost its protector."

Efforts to block demolition continued into the late 1960s, as the American Institute of Architects sought a Federal open-space grant to save the house. Famed architect Richard Neutra noted that the Dodge House was required study for architecture students throughout the world, and declared that demolition of the Dodge House would "not be a passing event ... it would become an epic, an international scandal." The Los Angeles Times pleaded: "Let this generation of Angelenos not be remembered as one that betrayed its successors for a few dollars."

=== Demolition and replacement with apartments ===
In November 1969, a lawsuit by the Citizens' Committee, seeking to stop the sale of the Dodge House, was rejected, and the house was sold to Riviera Management Company. The new owner demolished the house during a drenching rainstorm on February 9, 1970. On learning of the demolition, architect Kurt Meyer, who had fought for seven years to save the house, said, "This is like slashing a Rembrandt with a razor." The bulldozing of the Dodge House has been called one of "the most shameful chapters in L.A.'s legacy of self-destruction," and The New York Times called it a "tragic commentary on how we throw our national heritage away."

Apartments were built on the site.

== Lasting acclaim ==
Critical acclaim for the Dodge House has continued despite the demolition. Examples of the critical response include the following:

- A leading American architectural historian, William Jordy, said: "I believe it to be among the 15 most significant American houses. ... Perhaps no house built before World War I so clearly anticipated the modern movement as it developed in Europe."
- The American Institute of Architects, which sought to save the Dodge House, also rated it among the 15 most architecturally significant residences in the United States.
- Architectural historian Henry-Russell Hitchcock called the Dodge House a prophetic paradigm of Modernism in America.
- The house led Lewis Mumford to consider Gill "an equal to Louis Sullivan, Frank Lloyd Wright and Bernard Maybeck as a pioneer of the modernist movement."
- Dr. Ludwig Glaeser, curator of architecture at the Museum of Modern Art, New York, said, "Gill's new concepts, only today fully recognised, found their clearest expression in the Dodge House."
- The New York Times called the Dodge House Gill's "masterwork."
- The Historic American Buildings Survey called it a culmination of Gill's genius, and "a rare example of the early manifestations of the International Style, and also one of the great monuments of the early experimental architecture of reinforced concrete."
- In 1965 architectural historian Esther McCoy produced a film, referred to as Dodge House, 1916 based on its opening credits, which documented the house and the life of Irving Gill. The film was made in an attempt to save the house from demolition, but it failed. The film was rediscovered and restored in 2011, and it serves as one of the best surviving visual records of the building.

Bemoaning the loss of the Dodge House, the Daily News wrote in 1991: "Mention the name Irving J. Gill, and anyone who values our local architectural heritage is bound to rant and fume. Here was one of our true cultural pioneers ... Gill's dream for a California architectural style was not the grandiose exotic palaces of a Frank Lloyd Wright; he designed for humans, on a human scale. And now most of his best work has been lost. ... His gorgeous Dodge House in West Hollywood is long gone."

In December 2008, a panel of experts selected by the Los Angeles Times selected the Walter Dodge House as one of the top ten houses in Southern California. The Times wrote: "Hard to believe this Modernist treasure was torn down to make way for apartments, but it happened 38 years ago, when historic preservation was still an exotic notion here. ... Nowadays, Gill's historic home survives only through photographs, memory and reputation."

== See also ==
- Irving Gill
- Horatio West Court, Gill-designed apartments from the same period in Santa Monica
