= Seismic code =

Seismic codes or earthquake codes are building codes designed to protect property and life in buildings in case of earthquakes. The need for such codes is reflected in the saying, "Earthquakes don't kill people—buildings do." Or in expanded version, "Earthquakes do not injure or kill people. Poorly built manmade structures injure and kill people".

Seismic codes were created and developed as a response to major earthquakes, including 1755 Lisbon, 1880 Luzon, and 1908 Messina which have caused devastation in highly populated regions. Often these are revised based on knowledge gained from recent earthquakes and research findings, and as such they are constantly evolving. There are many seismic codes used worldwide. Most codes at their root share common fundamental approaches regarding how to design buildings for earthquake effects, but will differ in their technical requirements and will have language addressing local geologic conditions, common construction types, historic issues, etc.

== Origin ==
The 1755 Lisbon earthquake (Portugal) resulted in prescriptive rules for building certain kinds of buildings common in the area.

Following the 1908 Messina earthquake (Italy), the Royal Government of Italy established Geological Committee and Engineering Committee in early 1909 to study the disaster and recommend earthquake disaster mitigation measures. The Engineering Committee, after studying the lateral load resistance of buildings which survived the earthquake motion, recommended that the seismic ratio (seismic acceleration divided by the gravity acceleration) equal to 1/12 for the first floor and 1/8 for the floors above should be used in seismic design of buildings. The Committee proposed equivalent vertical forces much larger than the horizontal forces because vertical motion acted as impacts. This is believed to be the first known quantitative recommendation of design seismic forces in the history of seismic codes. The recommendation was adopted in Royal Decree No. 573 of April 29, 1915. The height of the buildings was limited to two stories, and the first story should be designed for a horizontal force equal to 1/8 the second floor weight and the second story for 1/6 of the roof weight.

The 1923 Great Kantō earthquake (Japan) and earlier events inspired Japanese engineer Toshikata Sano to develop a lateral force procedure that was officially implemented in the 1924 Japanese Urban Building Law, which directed engineers to design buildings for horizontal forces of about 10% of the weight of the building.

In 1925, the city of Santa Barbara, California, added a building code requirement that structures be designed to withstand horizontal forces, but was nonspecific regarding design loads or procedure. This is considered to be the first explicit policy and legal consideration of the seismic safety of structures in the U.S. The city of Palo Alto, California, led by professors at Stanford, also added similar language to its building code in 1926.

In January 1928, the first edition of the Uniform Building Code (UBC) was published, and included an appendix with non-mandatory matter with §2311 recommending a minimum lateral design force for earthquake resistance of V = 0.075W for buildings on foundations with allowable bearing pressures of 4,000 psf or more, and 0.10 W for all other buildings including those on pile foundations. Building weight (seismic mass) was defined as: W = Dead load + Live load. These provisions were inspired by Japan's newly developed seismic code. The non-mandatory lateral design provisions are not known to have been explicitly adopted by any jurisdiction at the time, but may have been used voluntarily for the design of some buildings.

In response to the 1933 Long Beach earthquake (California), the city of Los Angeles adopted the first earthquake design provisions enforced in the U.S., enacted by City Council under Ordinance No. 72,968 published on September 6, 1933. The requirements included a design lateral base shear V = 0.08 W for regular use buildings, 0.10 W for school buildings and 0.04 W for the portion of a building above a flexible story. Building weight (seismic mass) was defined as W = Dead load + 0.5 Live load (except 1.0 Live for warehouses). Building frames were required to be designed to withstand at least 0.25V independent of any walls.

Immediately after the 1933 Long Beach earthquake, careful analysis of structural failures in that quake by architect Louis John Gill formed the basis for much of the California seismic legislation (Field Act for schools and Riley Act for all buildings). The 1933 Riley Act required all California local governments to have a building department and inspect new construction, mandating that all structures in the state be designed to withstand a horizontal acceleration of 0.02 times the acceleration due to gravity.

== Around the world ==
=== Mexico ===
The first Mexico City building code was issued in 1942; since 1966, it contains a complete set of regulations for structural design and has served as a reference for municipalities across the country. In 1976, the code adopted a coherent format for all materials and structural systems, based on limit states design philosophy. In February 2004 a new set of seismic codes was issued.

=== Spain ===
In Spain, the seismic code is called the "Norma de Construcción Sismorresistente". (See the article in Spanish Wikipedia)

=== Turkey ===
The earliest Turkish seismic codes were published in the 1940s; TS500, Requirements for Design and Construction of Reinforced Concrete Structures and the Turkish Building Seismic Code. Several revisions of the codes have been published with additional stringent specifications. The last revision was published in 2018 and came into effect the following year. These codes, however, only affects reinforced concrete buildings; historical buildings, coastal and port infrastructure were excluded.

The 1940 seismic code was developed in response to the 1939 Erzincan earthquake which killed 32,000 people. It drew parallels with Italy's seismic codes at the time. A seismic zonation map was also developed in 1942 which assessed the seismic hazard of all Turkish provinces on three levels; "hazardous", "less hazardous" and "no hazard". The 1948 seismic codes were prepared in consideration of the seismic zone map. A new code was revised in 1961 and in 1963, the seismic zonation map was updated with four hazard levels based on predicted shaking on the Modified Mercalli intensity scale. It was subsequently added a fifth hazard level in the 1972 revision.

The 1968 seismic codes introduced additional demands for reinforced concrete component and modern concepts relating to spectral shape and dynamic response. Following the 1972 seismic zonation, the seismic codes were updated in 1975. It included new methods to compute seismic loading on buildings and ductile detailing for reinforced concrete. The zonation map and codes were revised in 1997.

Poor enforcement of seismic codes was a contributing factor to the devastation of the 2023 Turkey–Syria earthquakes in which over 50,000 people died. There were high incidences of support column failure leading to the pancake type collapses which complicates rescue efforts. In a bid to shore up support going into an election in 2018, the government began to offer amnesties for violations of the building code allowing the non-compliance. This has been done by previous governments too. Experts lamented the practice would turn cities into graveyards.

=== United States ===
In the United States, the Federal Emergency Management Agency (FEMA) publishes "Recommended Seismic Provisions for New Buildings and Other Structures. 2015 Edition".

== See also ==
- 2023 Turkey–Syria earthquake
