= La Jolla Woman's Club =

- U.S. National Register of Historic Places
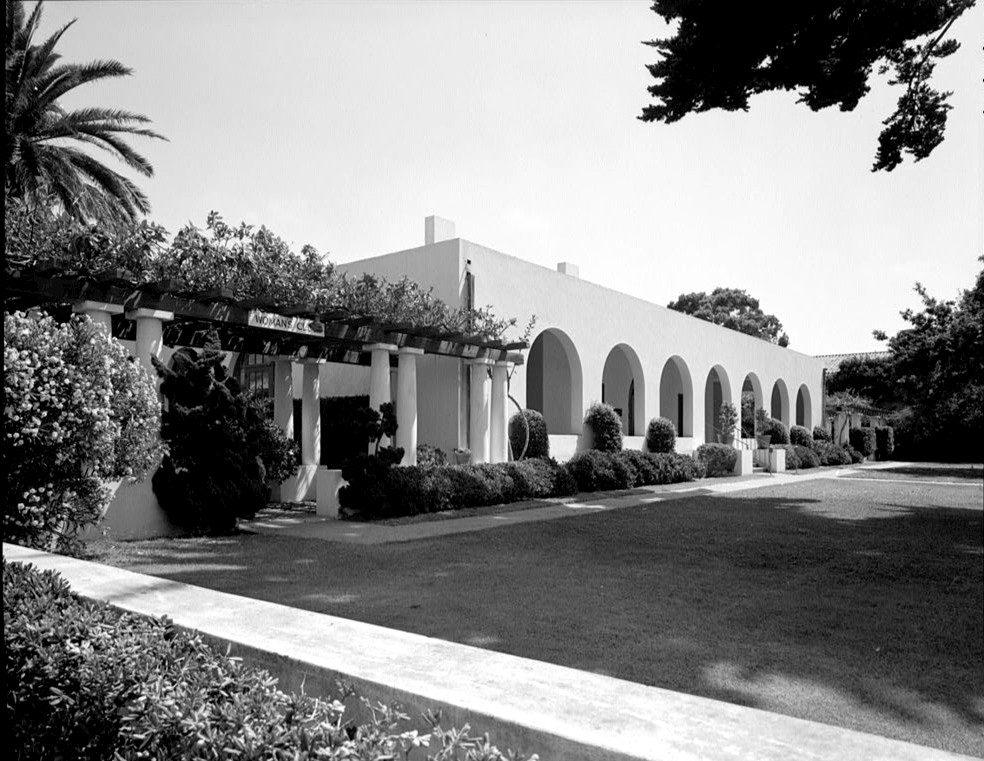
- The western (front) side of the La Jolla Woman's Club (in 1971)

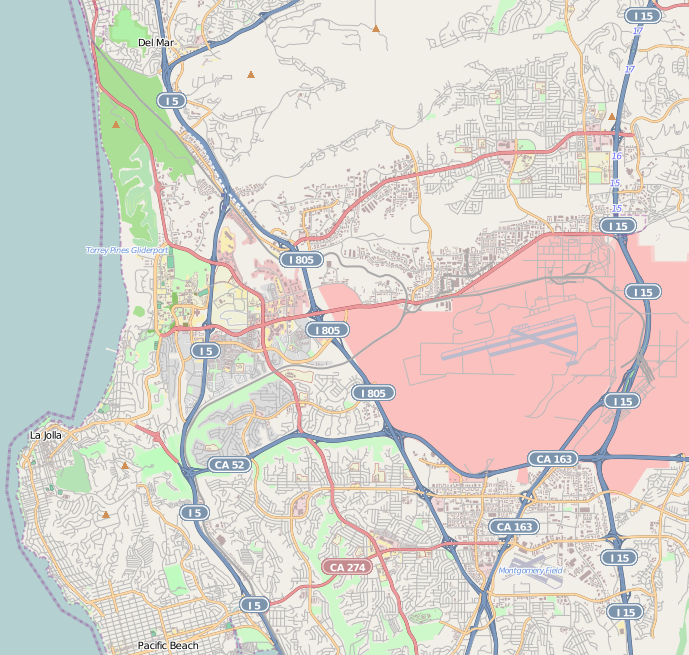
- Location within Northwestern San Diego Location within San Diego County, California Location within California Location within the United States
- Location: 715 Silverado St., La Jolla, California
- Coordinates: 32°50′39″N 117°16′36″W
- Area: 0.6 acres (0.24 ha)
- Built: 1914; 112 years ago
- Architect: Irving John Gill
- NRHP reference No.: 74000546
- Added to NRHP: November 5, 1974

The La Jolla Woman's Club is a women's club in a historic building in La Jolla, a neighborhood of San Diego, California. Designed and built by Irving Gill with assistance from his nephew Louis John Gill in 1914-1915, it is an important example of Gill's modern architectural style, and is listed on the National Register of Historic Places.

== History ==
The La Jolla Woman's Club was founded in 1894 as the Current Events Club, taking its present name in 1900. The social club was without a permanent home for the first twenty years of its existence. The cornerstone of the building was laid in December 1913, with the inaugural meeting held in 1914.

The site, design, and construction of the clubhouse were all donated to the La Jolla Woman's Club by philanthropist and club member Ellen Browning Scripps. The project cost a total of $40,000. The building is a prime example of Irving Gill's modern style, exemplified by simple geometrical shapes, and generous use of arches and columns, with a minimum of ornamentation. This style has been described as "shaved Spanish," as it owes much to the colonial Spanish architecture of southern California - and in particular the California missions - with an emphasis on flat rooflines, and lack of frills. The building also was a product of Gill's experimentation with the concrete "tilt-wall" construction method, in which concrete slabs were poured in place onto a large table positioned at a fifteen-degree angle. After it was set, the wall was lifted into place, and windows fitted into it. The interior of the building also showcases Gill's interest in sanitation: there are no baseboards, mouldings, or other design details, as Gill believed that these features trapped dust and dirt. The La Jolla Woman's Club has been called one of Gill's most successful works.

The building was added to the National Register of Historic Places in 1974, and is one of several notable Gill-designed buildings in La Jolla, along with The Bishop's School and the La Jolla Recreation Center. The clubhouse is open to visitors on Saturdays from 9:00 am to noon.

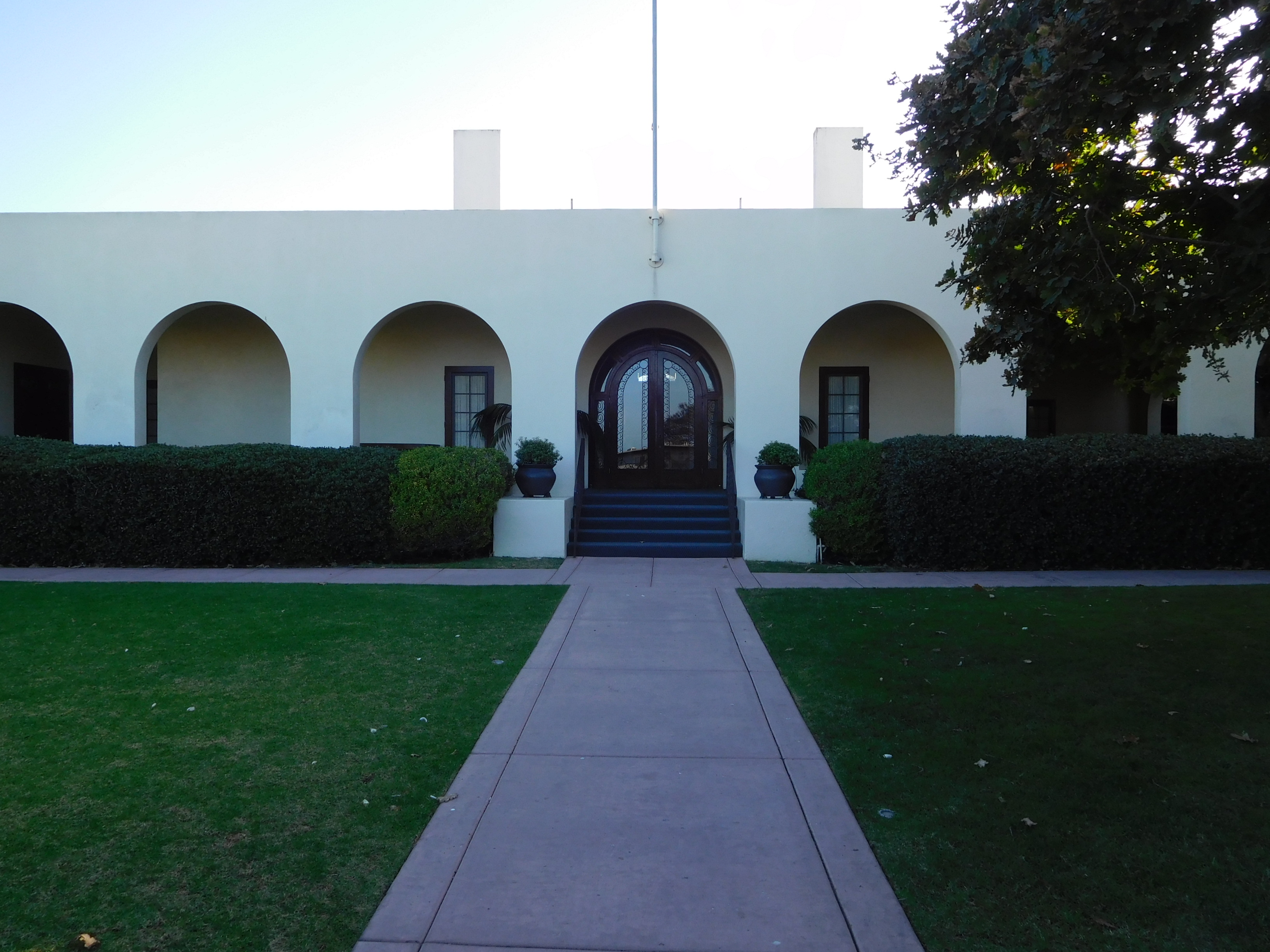
The building in 2019
