= Americanization School =

- U.S. National Register of Historic Places
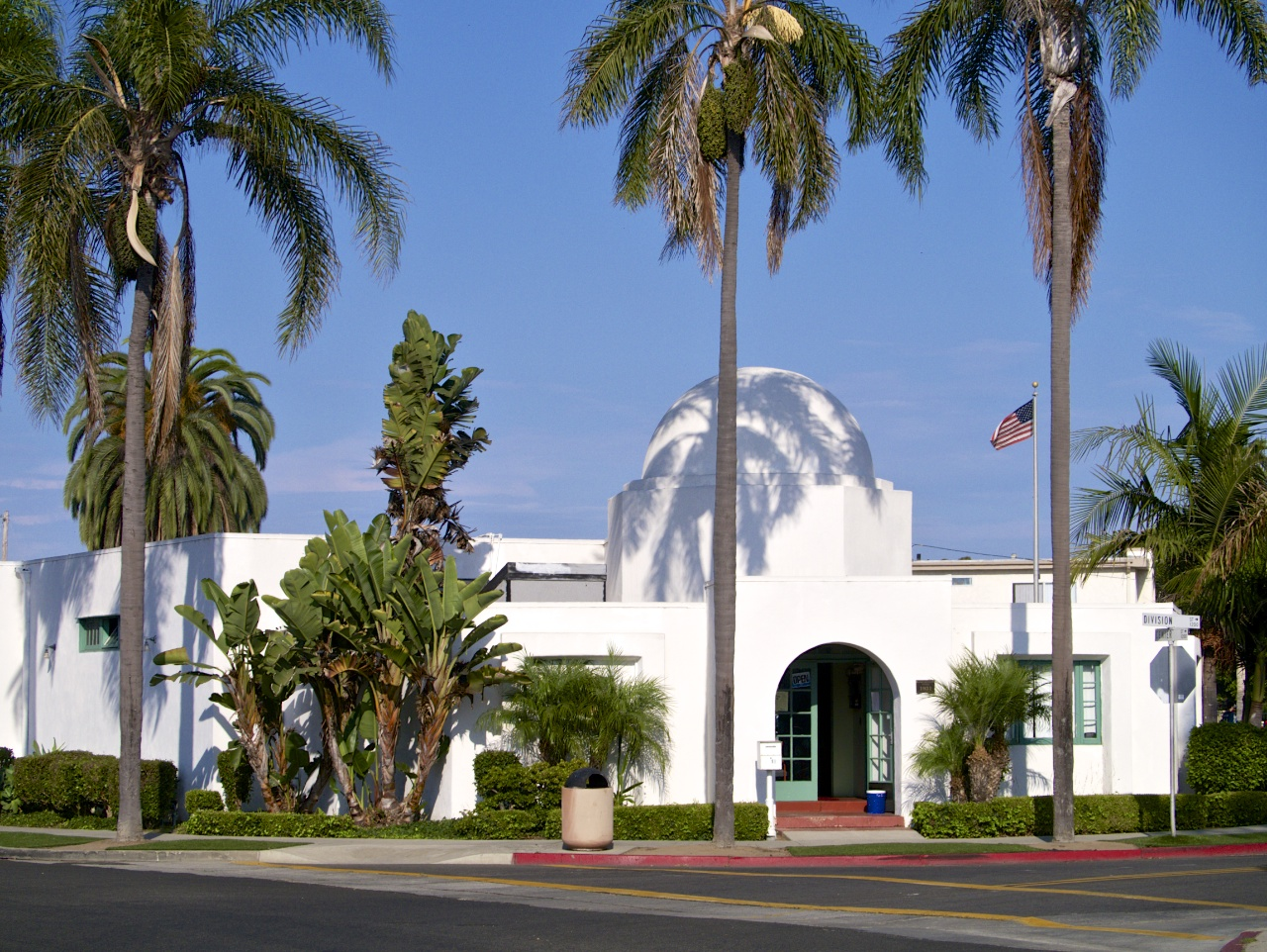

- Location within San Diego County, California Location within California Location within the United States
- Location: 1210 Division St., Oceanside, California
- Coordinates: 33°11′47″N 117°22′19″W
- Area: less than one acre
- Built: 1931
- Architect: Gill, Irving J.
- Architectural style: Moderne, Islamic
- NRHP reference No.: 94000311
- Added to NRHP: April 08, 1994

The Americanization School in Oceanside, California, built in 1931, was intended as an assimilation school where Spanish-speaking Oceanside residents would be taught English and civics. Historically, it reflects a time before the rise of multiculturalism where immigrants who arrived in the United States were more actively Americanized in assimilation programs.

The building, now known as the Crown Heights Resource Center, was designed by Irving Gill. It was listed on the National Register of Historic Places in 1994. The school was one of the last works by Gill, a pioneer of modern architecture and one of nearby San Diego's most celebrated architects.

== Building design ==
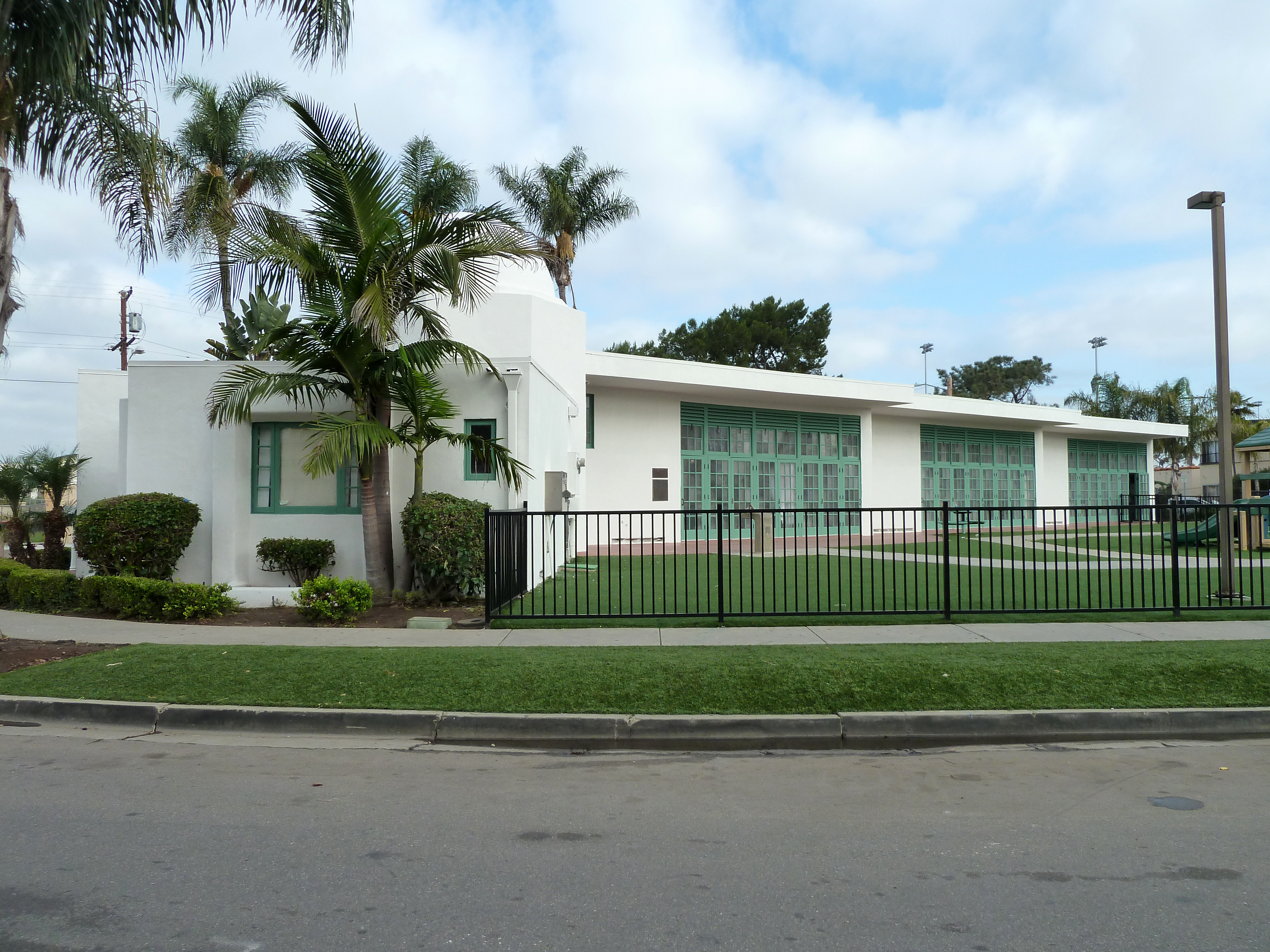
Gill designed the south-facing side of the classrooms to bring in natural light.

Late in his career, Gill had been taking fewer and smaller projects. Several were in Oceanside, where he continued to try to develop his work. The Americanization school displays hints of Art Deco while also taking in North African–Islamic influences that he picked up from his brief partnership with Frank Mead, another San Diego architect. Gill designed the 3,550-square-foot (330 m^{2}) wood-frame and stucco structure to fit its triangular, wedge-shaped corner site. With a prominent corner, Gill placed an arched entryway with a minimalist Islamic-style dome atop a short, octagonal tower. For class space, Gill planned two wings to run back from the corner, along the length of the lot in a V-shape; however, only one was ever built. To break up a potentially monotonous wall, he stepped the classes into three sections along the edge of the property. To bring in natural light, he placed clerestory windows and French doors to the south-facing side.

== Conversion ==
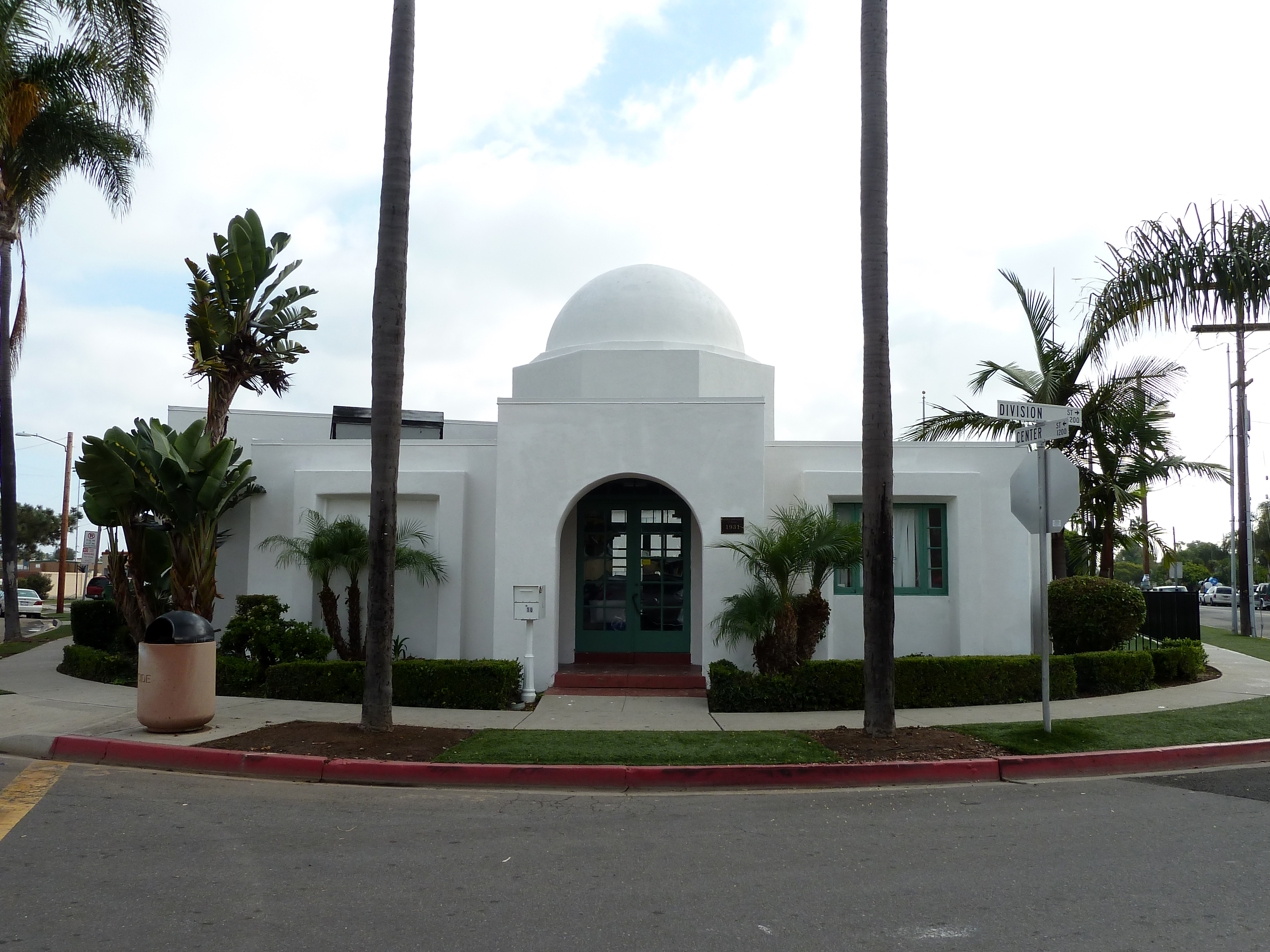
Front view

By the early 1990s, the structure was not in use, rundown and boarded up. In 1992, the City of Oceanside began a $316,000 restoration, with $50,000 in city money and the rest in donated services. The Crown Heights Resource Center moved into the structure in July 2001 from a nearby house. The resource center was initially opened in 1996 in response to the high crime rate and gang activity in the surrounding neighborhood, and is operated by the Housing and Neighborhood Services Department of the City of Oceanside.
