= Miltimore House =

Historic house in California, United States

- U.S. National Register of Historic Places
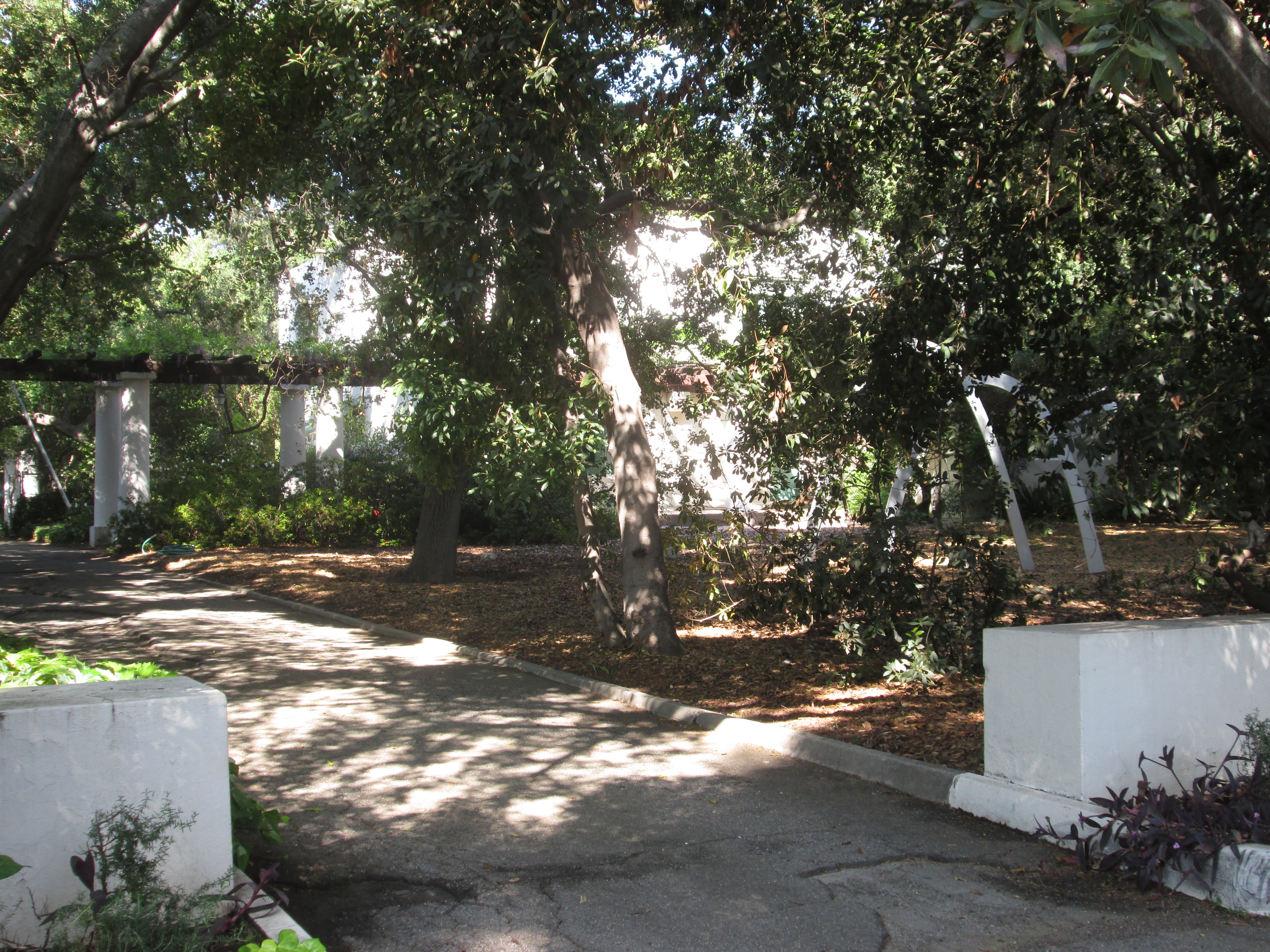
- The Miltimore House in 2015

- Location within California Location within the United States
- Location: 1301 South Chelten Way, South Pasadena, California
- Coordinates: 34°6′41″N 118°8′30″W
- Area: 1 acre (0.40 ha)
- Architect: Irving Gill
- NRHP reference No.: 72000235
- Added to NRHP: March 24, 1972

The Miltimore House is a historic house in South Pasadena, California, U.S.. It was designed by architect Irving Gill. It has been listed on the National Register of Historic Places since March 24, 1972.
