= Granger Hall (National City, California) =

- U.S. National Register of Historic Places
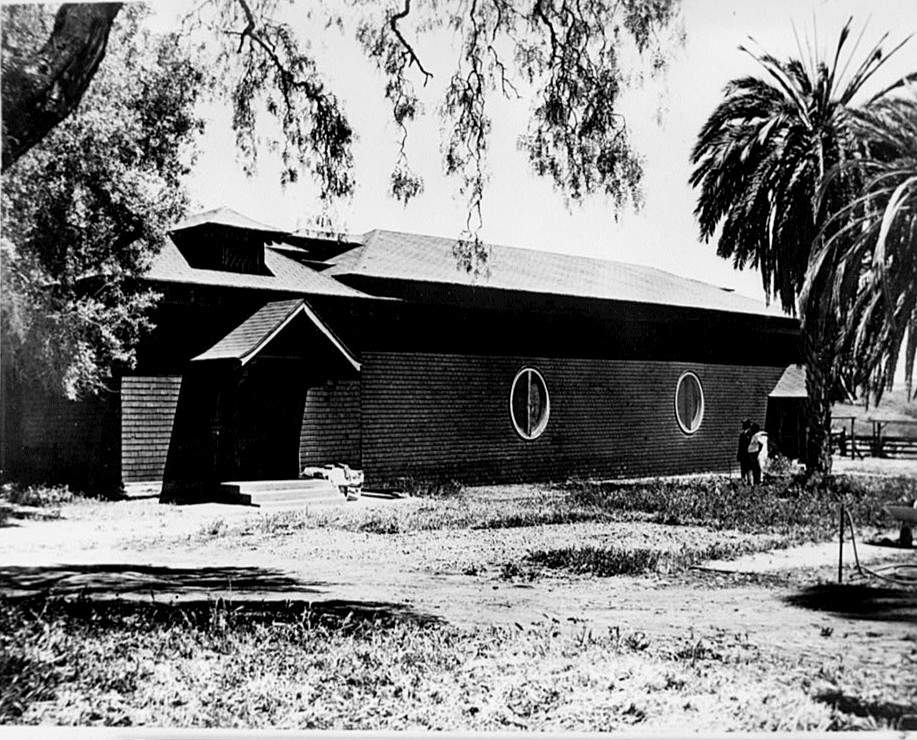

- Location within San Diego Location within San Diego County, California Location within California Location within the United States
- Location: 1700 E. 4th St., National City, California
- Coordinates: 32°41′4″N 117°5′26″W
- Area: 0.7 acres (0.28 ha)
- Built: 1898; 1969
- Architect: Gill, Irving John
- NRHP reference No.: 75000465
- Added to NRHP: March 18, 1975

Granger Hall, a historic building currently located at 1700 E. 4th St. in National City, California, was built in 1898 as an "acoustically perfect" music auditorium addition to a smaller music room in the Paradise Valley estate of Ralph Granger. Granger made a fortune in the "Last Chance" silver mine in Colorado during the 1890s. The building, moved later, has also been known as Granger Music Hall. It was listed on the National Register of Historic Places in 1975.

It was originally an 80-by-32-foot (24.4 m × 9.8 m) room. It was designed by architect Irving Gill who learned acoustical technique working under Adler and Sullivan. The acoustic properties include a design having no parallel walls or surfaces, including having the floor slope slightly forward and the ceiling and walls having "a slight canter". The ceiling has a 75-foot (23 m) mural of Euterpe, Greek goddess of music, and cherubs.

It was moved from its original location at 2600 East 8th 12 blocks to El Toyon Park, in 1969. The present hall is 100 by 32 feet (30.5 m × 9.8 m) in size, with the original music room incorporated as a foyer, and seats 150. It has a painted cedar shingle exterior.
