= Clarke Estate =

Historic house in California, United States

- U.S. National Register of Historic Places
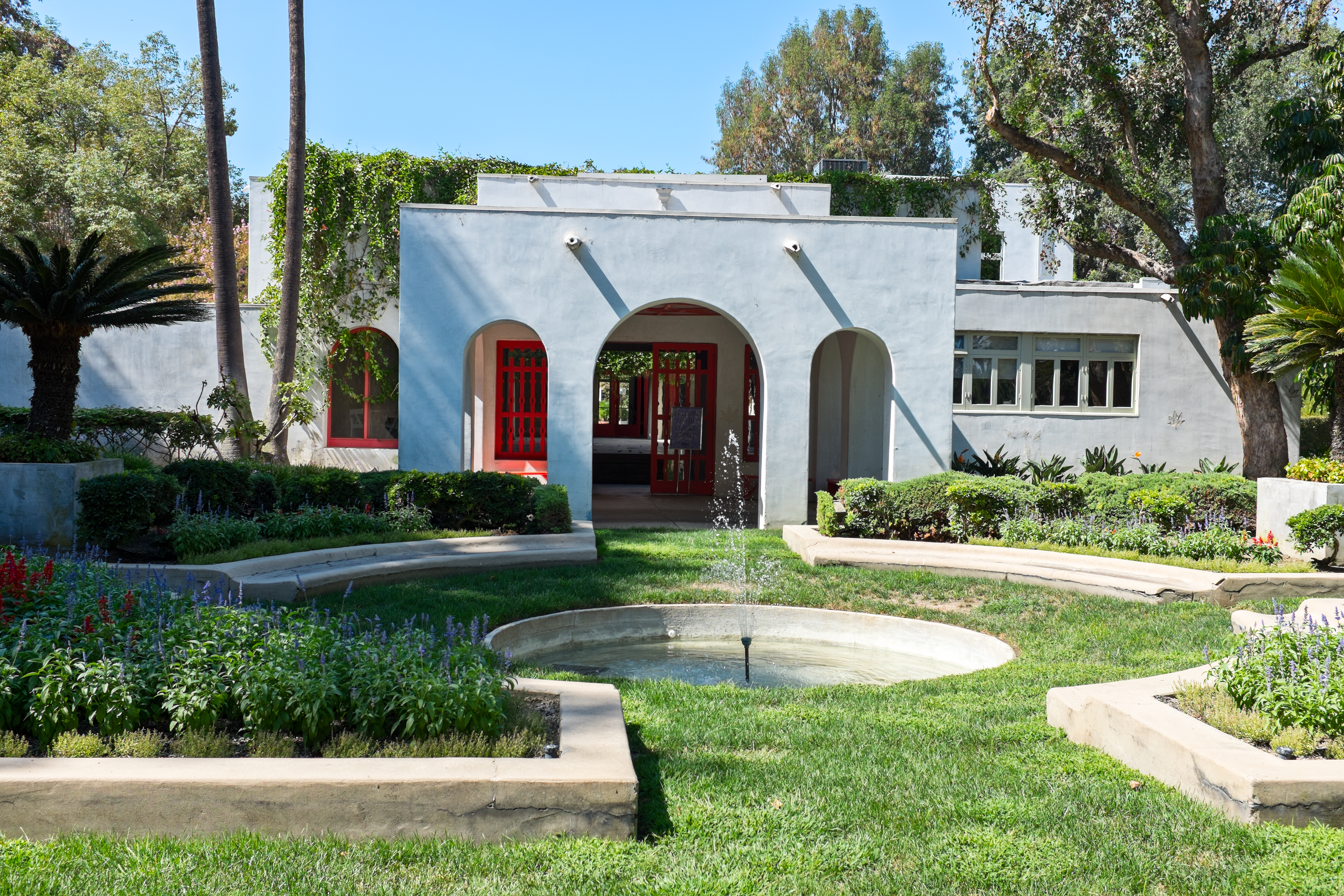

- Location within California
- Location: 10211 Pioneer Blvd., Santa Fe Springs, California
- Coordinates: 33°56′36″N 118°4′52″W
- Area: 3.1 acres (1.3 ha)
- Built: 1921
- Architect: Irving John Gill
- Architectural style: Mission Reduction
- NRHP reference No.: 89002267
- Added to NRHP: January 4, 1990

The Clarke Estate is a historic mansion in Santa Fe Springs, California, U.S.. It was built from 1919 to 1921 for Chauncey Clarke and his wife, Marie Rankin Clarke. It was designed by architect Irving Gill. It has been listed on the National Register of Historic Places since January 4, 1990.
