= Louis John Gill =

American architect

- Born: May 9, 1885; Syracuse, New York, U.S.
- Died: August 19, 1969 (aged 84); Studio City, Los Angeles, U.S.
- Education: Syracuse University
- Occupation: Architect
- Buildings: San Diego County Administration Building, San Diego Zoo, Sacred Heart Church in Coronado

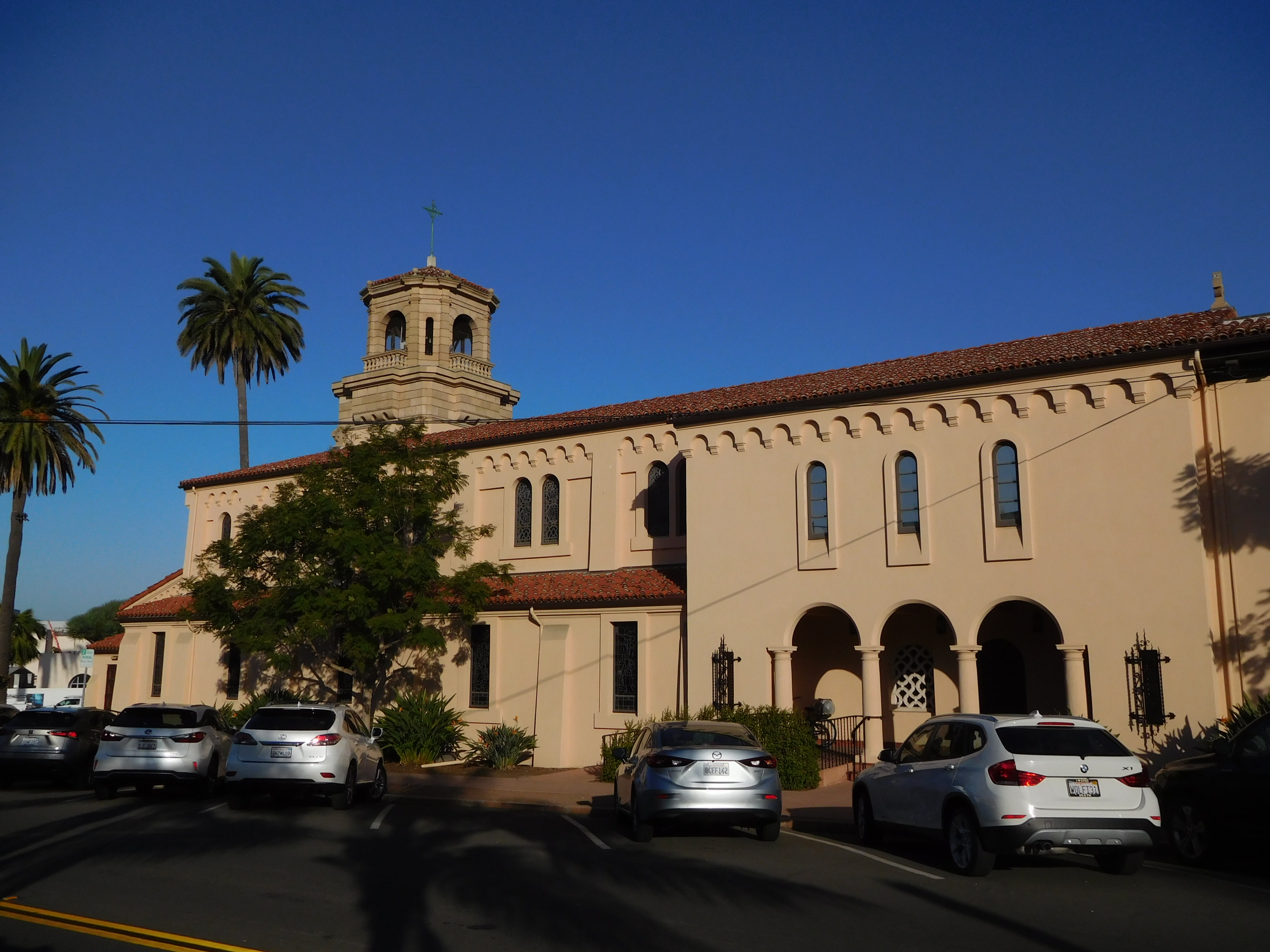
St. James by the Sea, La Jolla

Louis John Gill FAIA (May 9, 1885 – August 19, 1969) was a San Diego–based architect and the nephew and one-time business partner of another famous San Diego architect, Irving Gill. The San Diego Historical Society calls Louis Gill "one of San Diego's greatest architects".

== Biography ==
Louis J. Gill grew up in Syracuse, New York, and graduated from Syracuse University in 1911. He immediately moved to San Diego and went to work at his uncle's architectural firm as a draftsman, becoming chief draftsman by 1913. In 1914 his uncle took him on as a partner. Their partnership, known as Gill and Gill, Architects, lasted five years. As his uncle's associate, Louis contributed to the design of several notable buildings including La Jolla Woman's Club (now listed on the National Register of Historic Places) and the Ellen Browning Scripps residence at 700 Prospect Street (now the Museum of Contemporary Art San Diego).

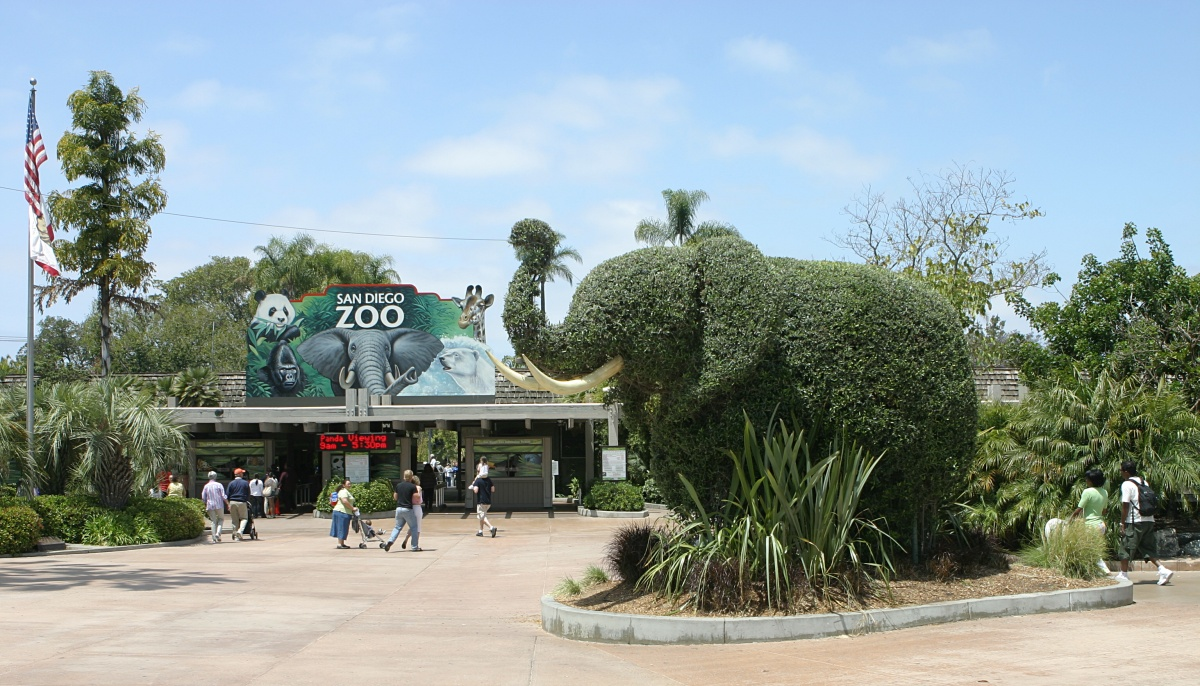
Entrance to the San Diego Zoo

In 1919, he and his uncle dissolved their partnership and Louis struck out on his own. Louis had been taking on individual projects even before leaving the partnership. In 1916, the year of its founding, he was named to be the architect for the San Diego Zoo. He designed the original buildings and enclosures for the Zoo and remained on the Zoo's executive staff for more than 20 years, designing and remodeling multiple buildings and exhibits.

In 1933, within hours of the 1933 Long Beach earthquake, Gill traveled to the scene in his role as president of the California State Board of Architectural Examiners. The results of his careful analysis of structural failures during the earthquake formed the basis for much of the subsequent California earthquake code legislation (Field Act for schools and Riley Act for all buildings). Those standards are now used in many other places throughout the world.

Gill was a co-founder of the San Diego Chapter of the American Institute of Architects. He served on the California State Board of Architectural Examiners for more than 20 years, including two terms as president (1932–1934 and 1947–1949).

In 1955 he retired. He and his wife lived in San Diego's Mission Hills neighborhood until July 1969, when he moved to Studio City. He died there on August 19, 1969.

== Works ==
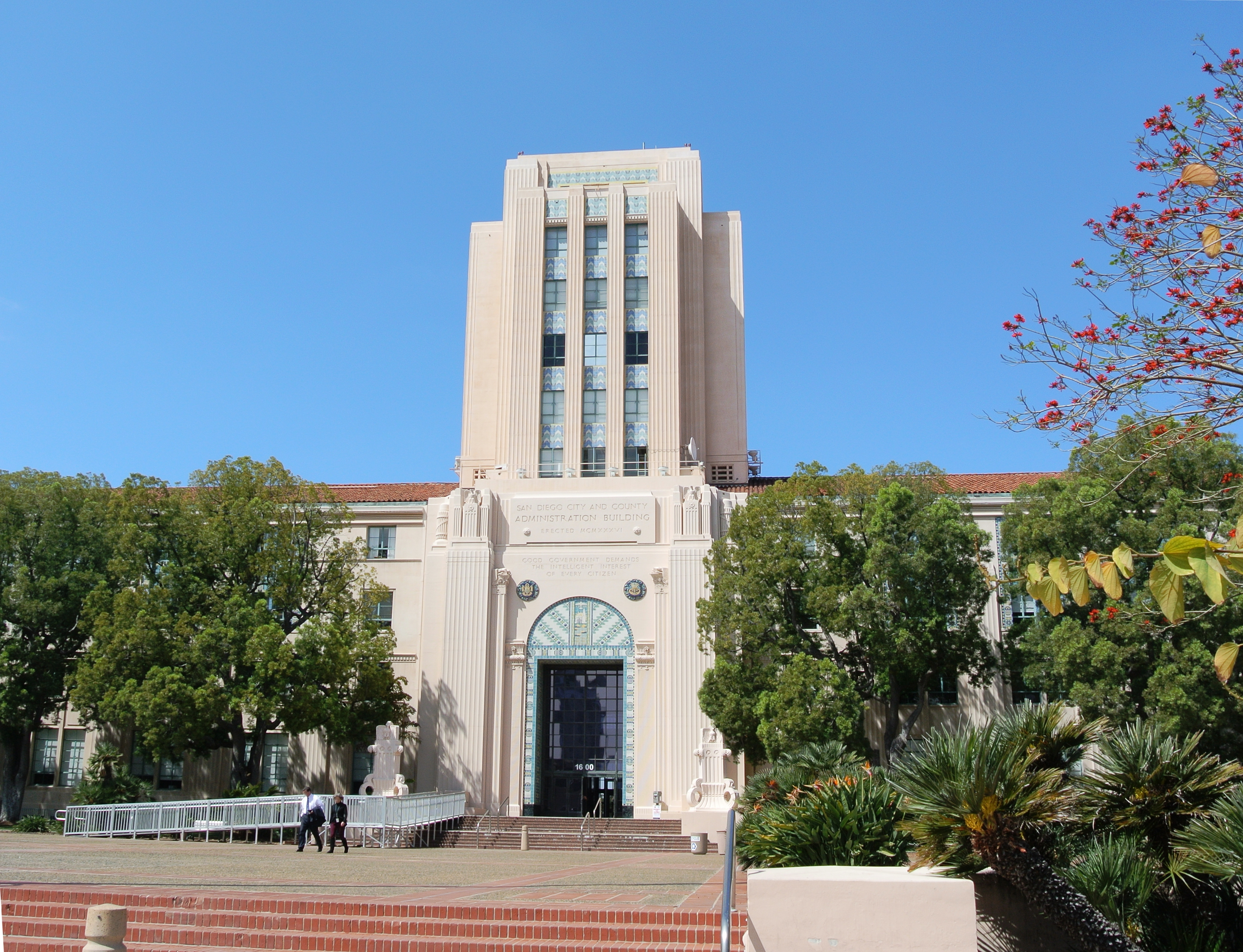
San Diego County Administration Building

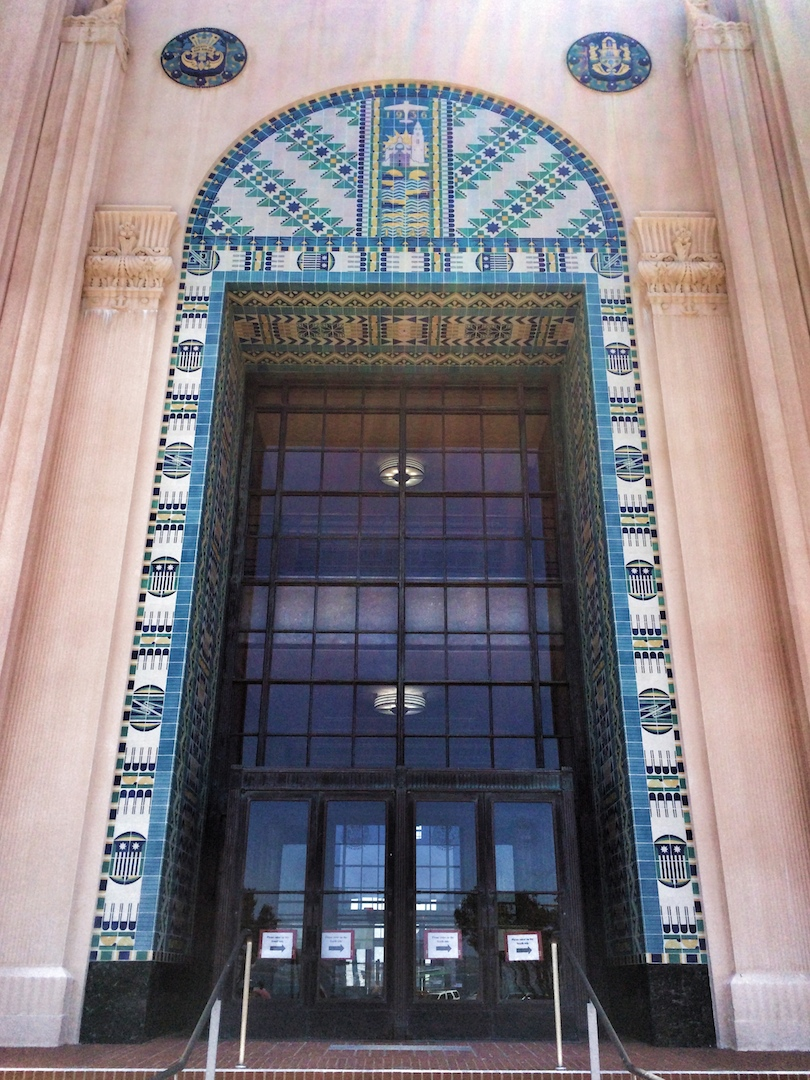
San Diego County Administration Building, detail of west entrance

Louis Gill's works include (all in San Diego except as noted):

- Dr. Harry Wegeforth residence, 210 Maple Street, Bankers Hill (1916), now the Junior League of San Diego
- Sacred Heart Church in Coronado in Mission Revival style, considered his finest church
- Mission Hills Congregational Church, Fort Stockton Drive and Jackdaw Street, modified Spanish Revival style
- St. James-by-the-Sea church, La Jolla, with a tower replicating that of a church at Campo Florida in Mexico City
- Rees-Stealy Clinic, Fourth and Grape Streets (1926)
- San Diego Hospital Clinic at the northeast corner of Seventh and G Streets (1928), now the Arlington Apartment Hotel
- John W. Mitchell Art Gallery in Coronado (demolished)
- Hardware and Grocery Store, 147 W. San Ysidro Blvd., San Ysidro, San Diego, formerly known as San Ysidro Commercial Company, (1929) now TheFront art gallery
- San Diego County Administration Center (1938) – Gill was the chairman of the group of four architects that designed this building, which is now listed on the National Register of Historic Places in San Diego County
- San Diego Zoo projects:
  - 1916: design of the original buildings, cages and animal grottos
  - 1922: Redesign of the International Harvester Building from the Panama Exposition to serve as Reptile House and Zoo entry
  - 1926: Spanish Revival-style research hospital, for which Gill received an Honor Award from the San Diego Chapter of the American Institute of Architects.
  - 1937: bird cage, then the largest bird cage in the world.

== Recognition ==
- In 1938 his alma mater, Syracuse University, presented him with an honorary Doctor of Fine Arts degree, describing him as a "skilled designer and leader in the profession of architecture on the west coast of the United States."
- The American Institute of Architects elected him to their College of Fellows in 1942, "in recognition of the high quality of his architectural work, for his unselfish service in the interests of the organization's San Diego Chapter and his constructive activities in civic affairs."
- His collected papers are housed in the University of California, Santa Barbara's Art, Design & Architecture Museum.
