= Oceanside City Hall and Fire Station =

- U.S. National Register of Historic Places
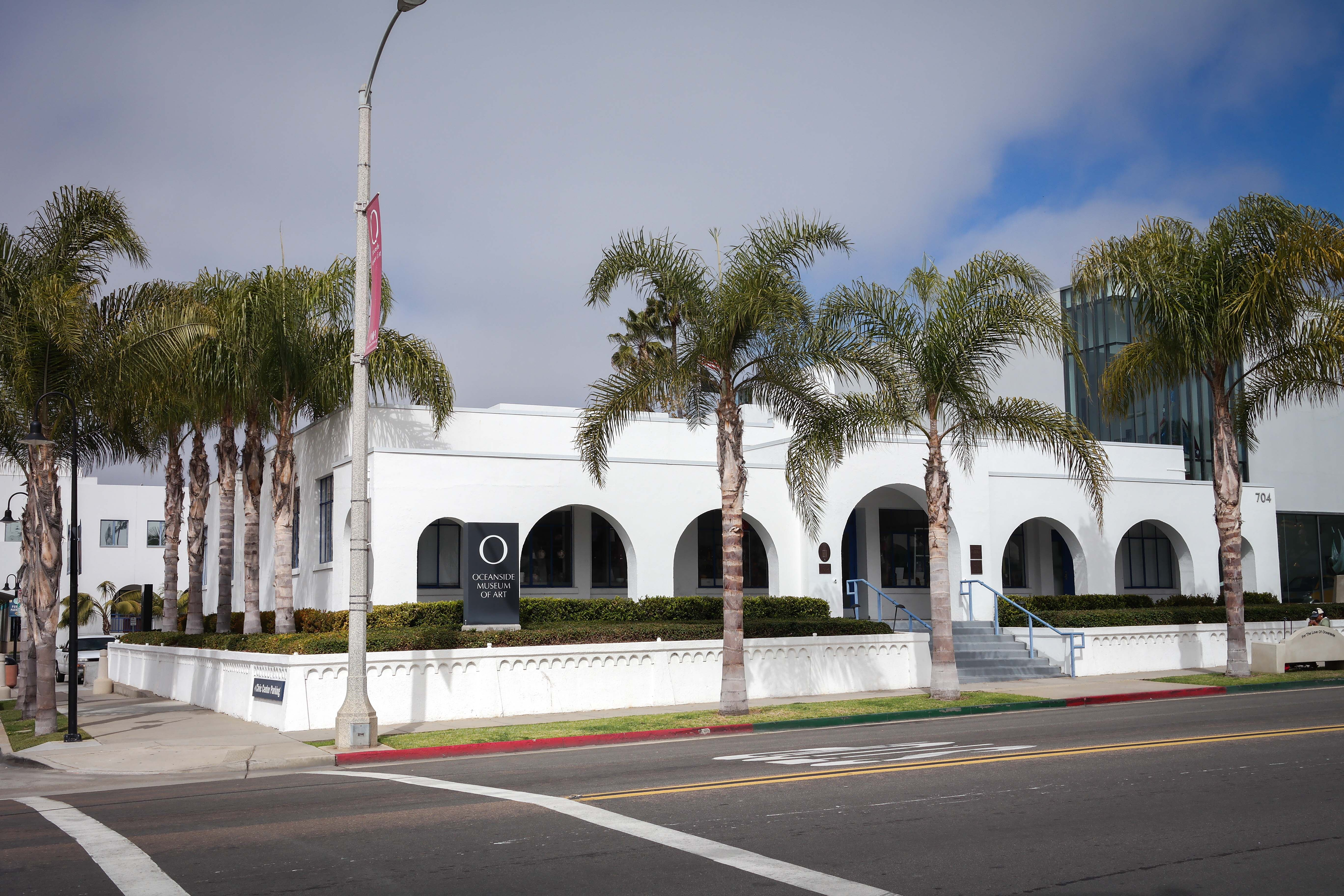
- City Hall

- Location within California
- Location: 704 and 714 Pier View Way (Third St.), Oceanside, California
- Coordinates: 33°11′53″N 117°22′40″W
- Area: 1.5 acres (0.61 ha)
- Built: 1929
- Architect: Irving J. Gill
- Architectural style: Moderne, Mission/spanish Revival
- NRHP reference No.: 89000257
- Added to NRHP: June 7, 1989

The Oceanside City Hall and Fire Station, also known as Oceanside Civic Center, at 704 and 714 Third St. in Oceanside, California, was built in 1929. It was listed on the National Register of Historic Places in 1989.

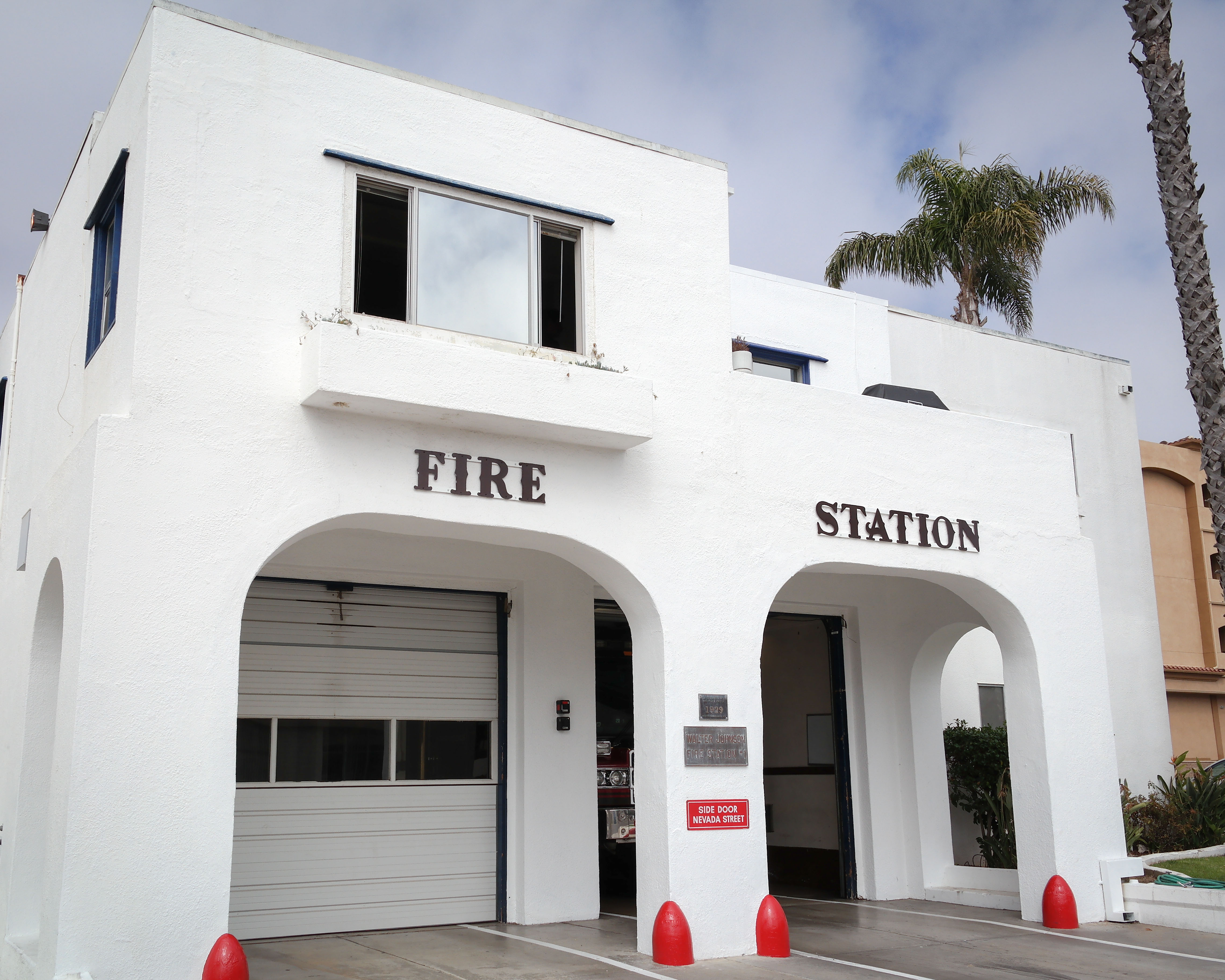

It consists of two buildings, a single-story L-shaped city hall and a two-story fire station with a 50 feet (15 m) tower, which are visually linked by a retaining wall.

The buildings were designed by architect Irving J. Gill in 1929 as part of a larger civic complex which was not completed.

The listing included one contributing object.
