= Horatio West Court =

- U.S. National Register of Historic Places
- Santa Monica Historic Landmark
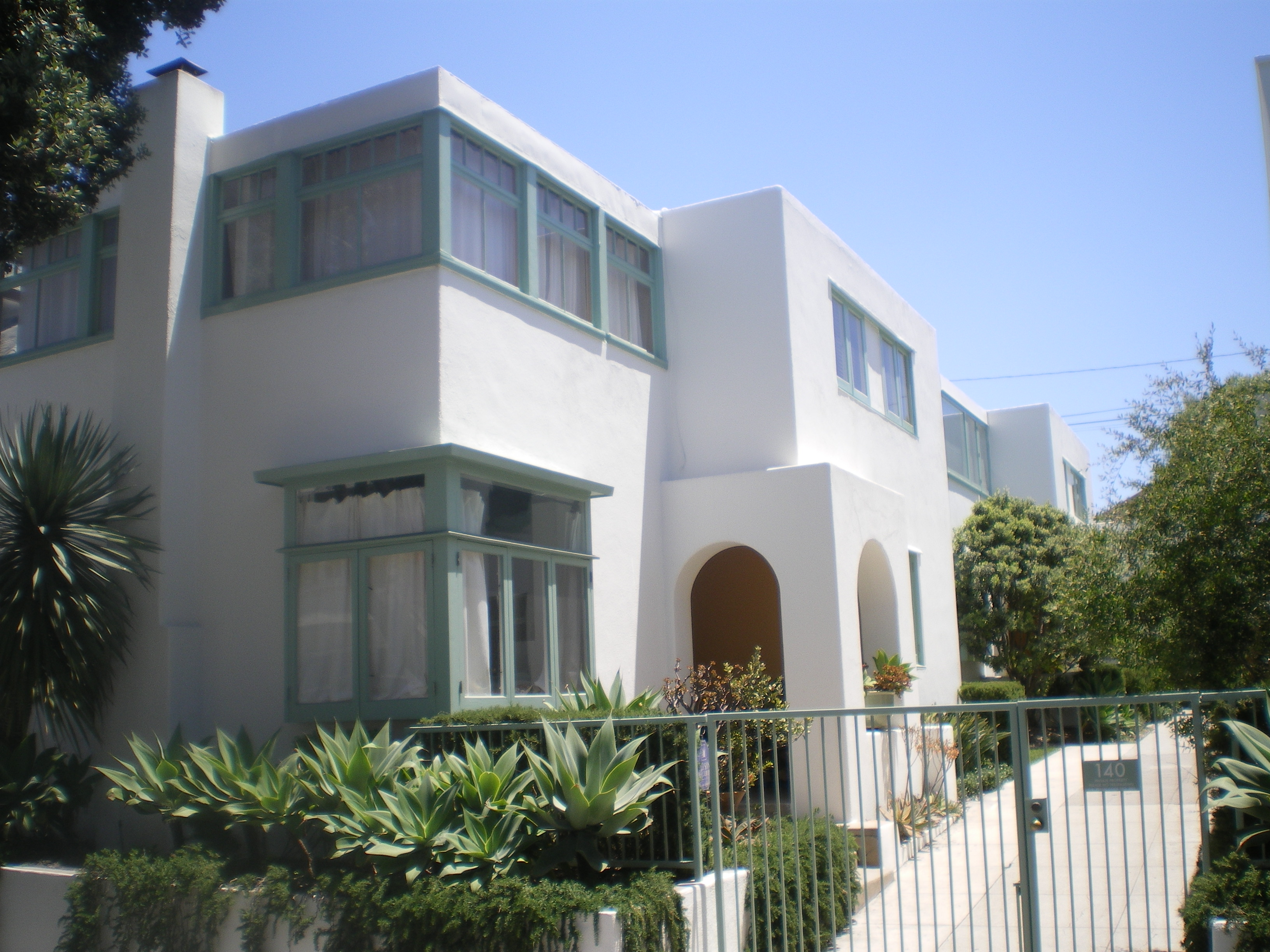
- Horatio West Court, 2008

- Location within the Los Angeles metropolitan area Location within California Location within the United States
- Location: Santa Monica, California
- Coordinates: 34°0′12″N 118°29′10″W
- Built: c. 1921
- Architect: Irving Gill
- Architectural style: Modern Movement
- NRHP reference No.: 77000302
- SMHL No.: 10

Significant dates
- Added to NRHP: April 11, 1977
- Designated SMHL: January 2, 1979

Horatio West Court, built in Santa Monica, California in 1919, is an early example of attached houses with shared pedestrian and vehicle access. The six little buildings are grouped on a 60-foot lot. It was designed by Irving Gill.

Horatio West Court divides its narrow lot symmetrically, placing two units on either side of a driveway that runs the length of the lot to a rear parking area, where two garages are topped with little apartments. Each building is a slightly inflected, flat-roofed two-story cube to which a small entrance porch and a walled terrace has been added. The arched entry ways and small patio courts reflect Gill's affinity for the Mission Revival style. However, the buildings themselves fall squarely into the Modern Movement.

Richard Neutra extensively photographed the Horatio West Court as well as Gill's Dodge House and published in his book Amerika: Neues Bauen in der Welt (1930). In Leland Roth's American Architecture: A History, the Horatio West Court is described as "Gill's flat-roof crisply-rectilinear apartment complex." In Coastal California, John A. Vlahides and Tullan Spitz describe the complex as "one of the best examples of Irving Gill's revolutionary modernism."

The Horatio West Court was listed in the National Register of Historic Places in 1977, the first building in the City of Santa Monica to be listed in the National Register.

== Gallery of images ==
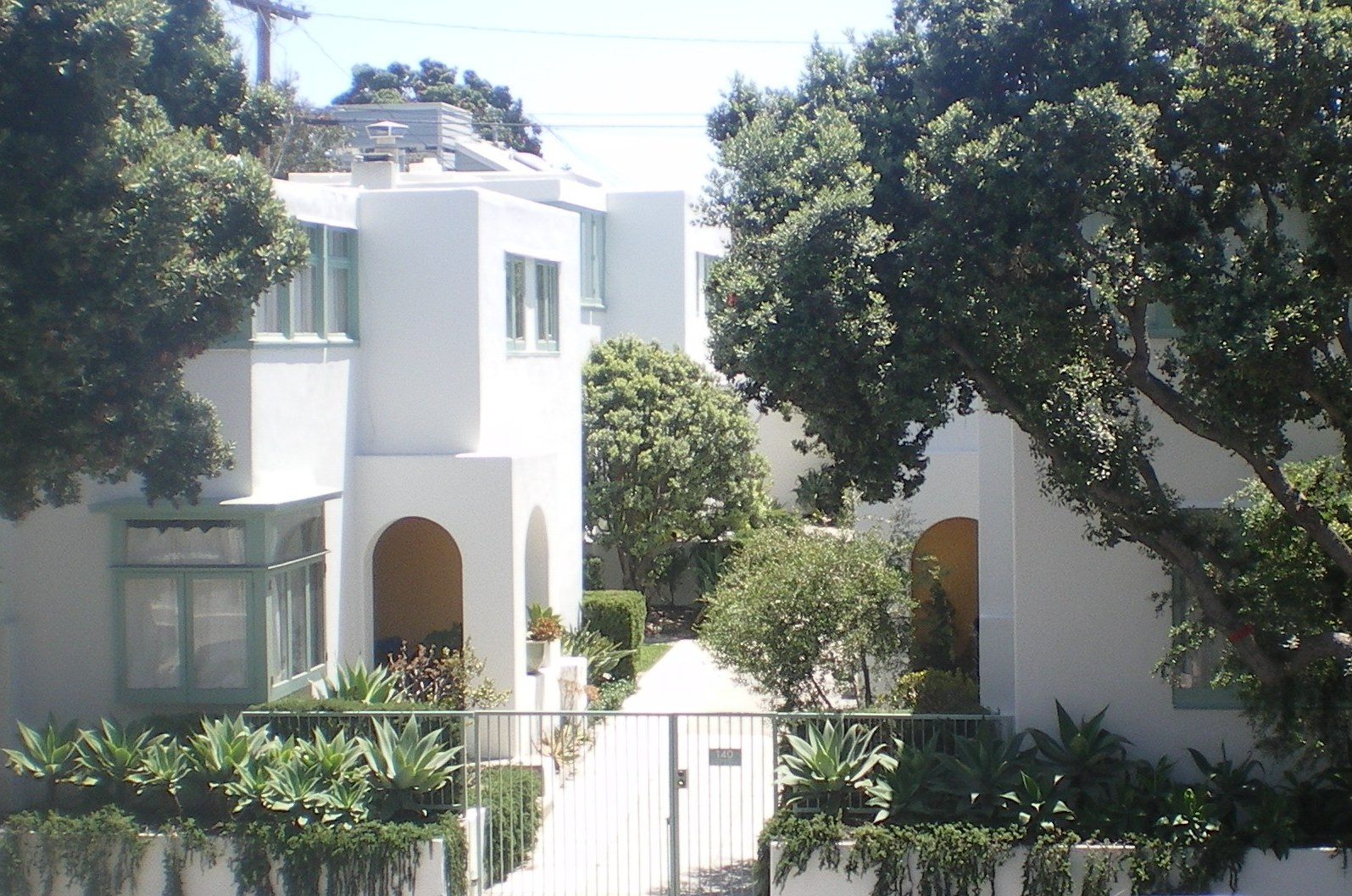

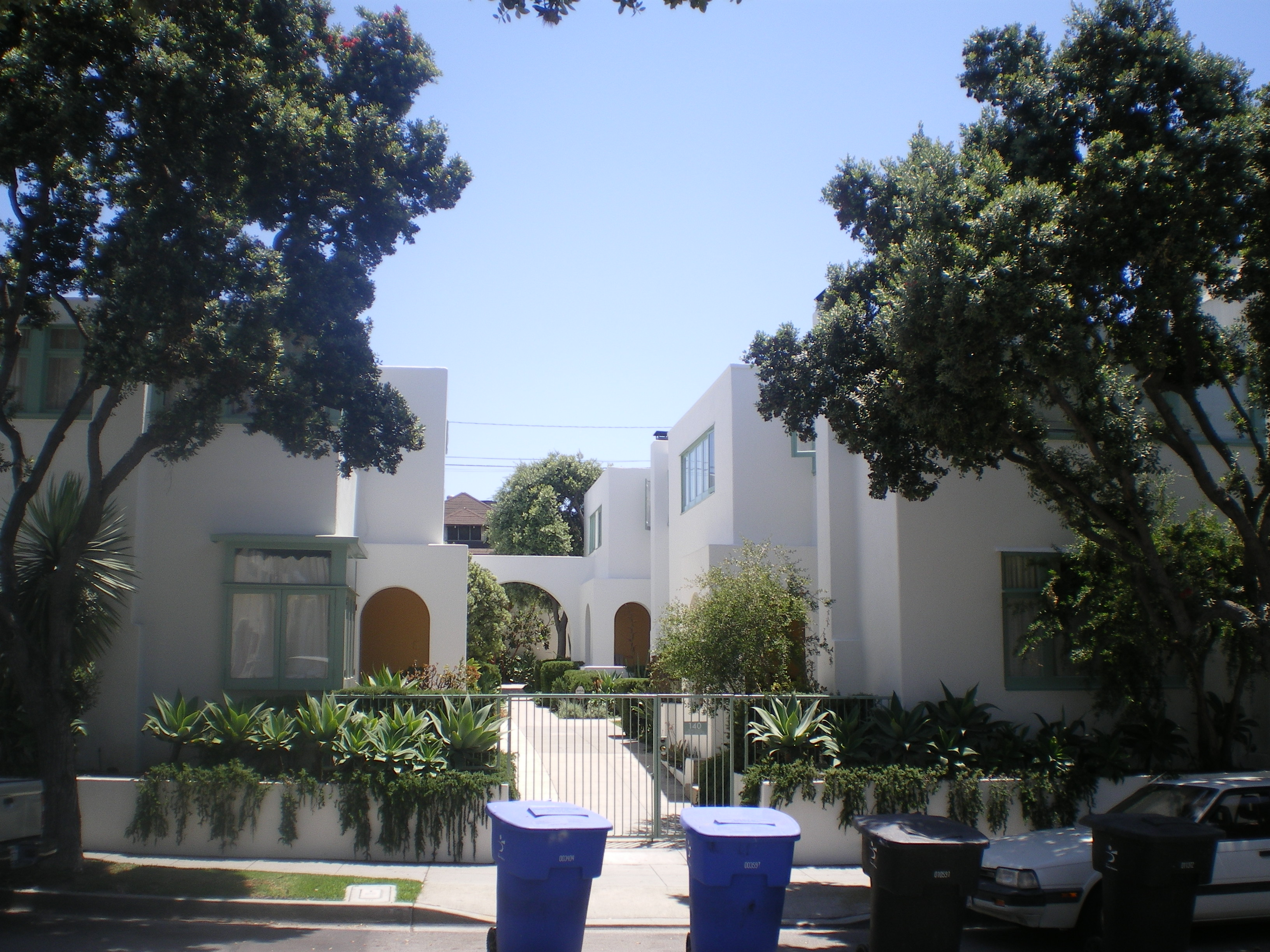

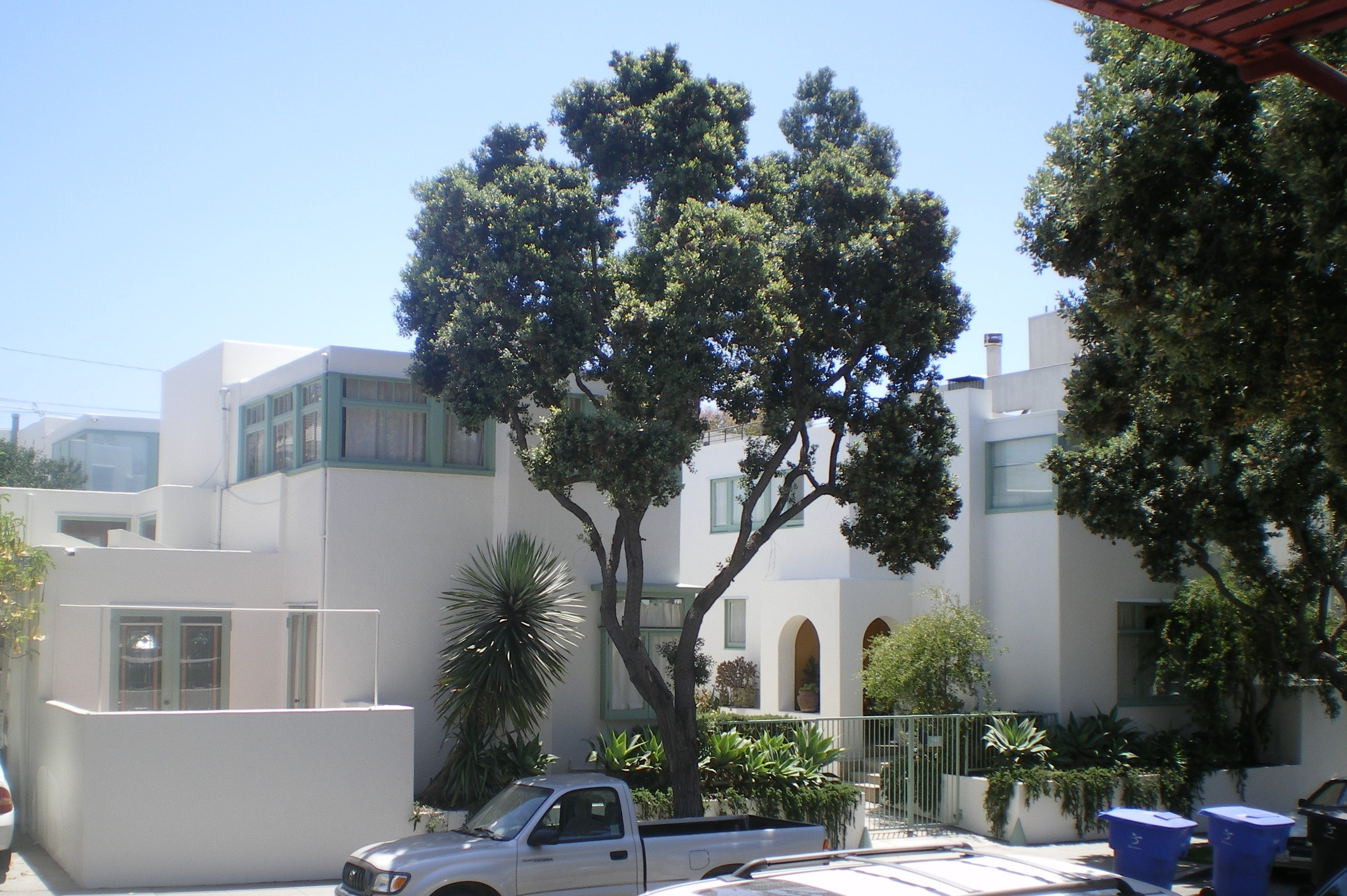

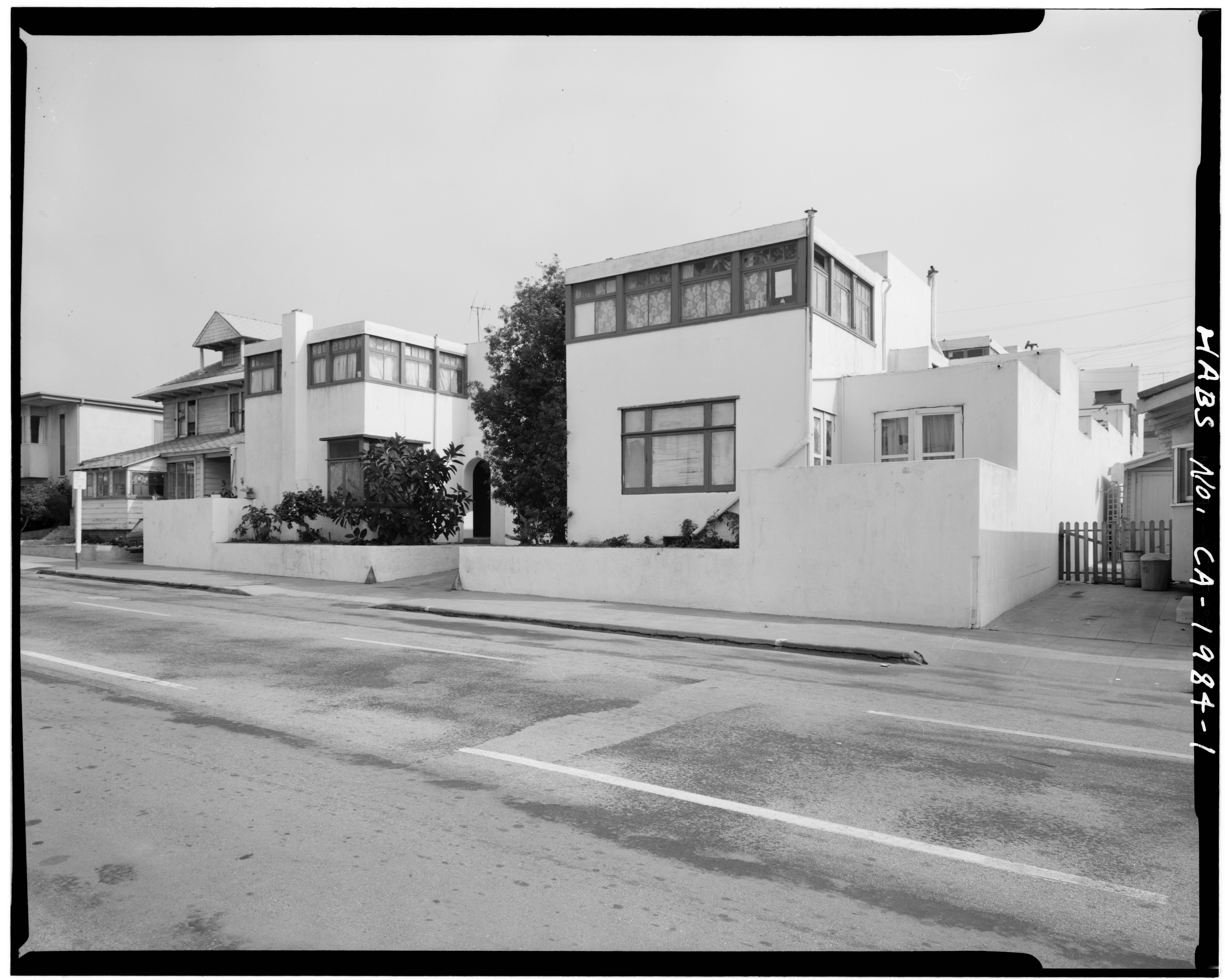
General view from west

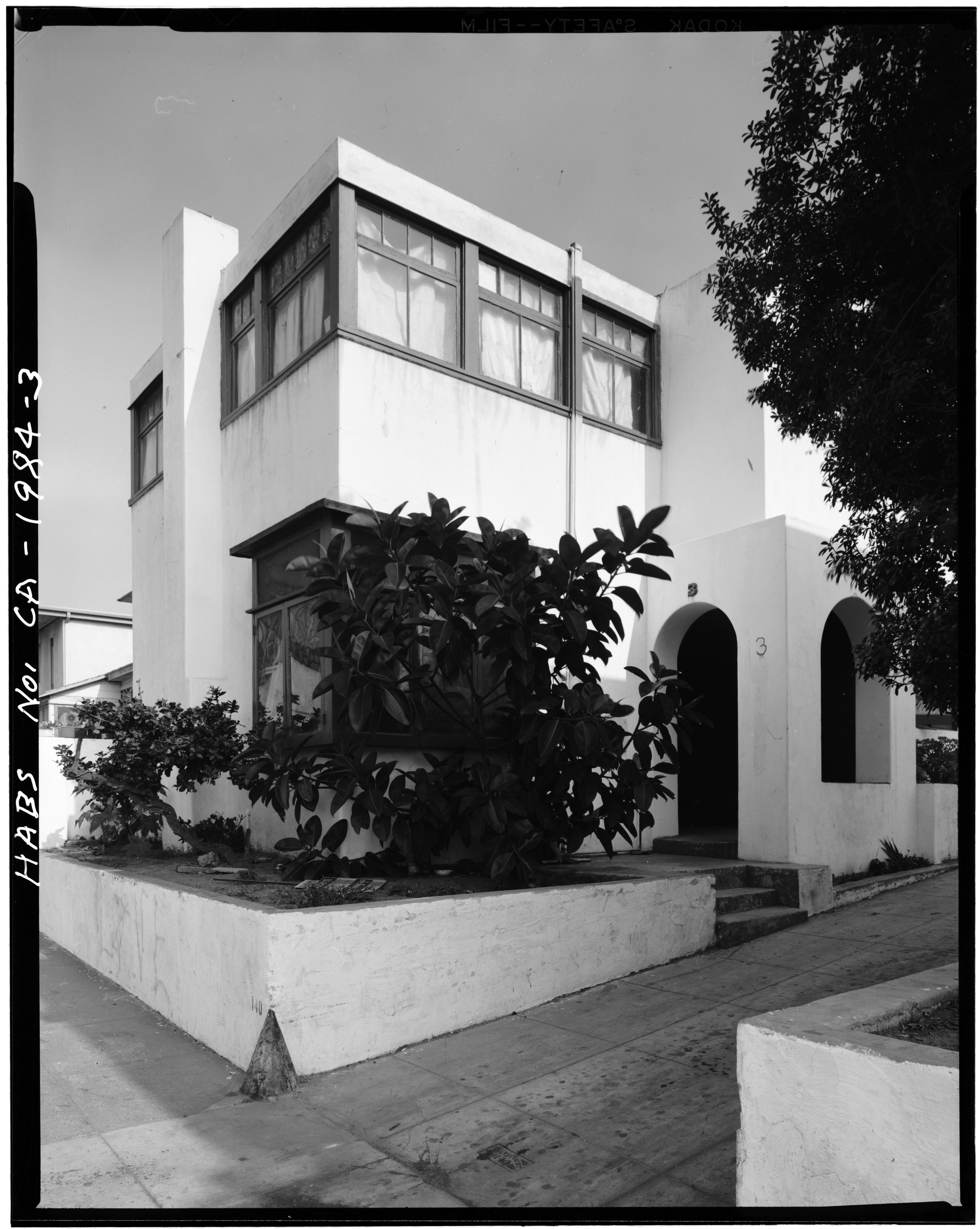
