= Field Act =

1933 California law on seismic proofing standards for schools

The Field Act is a California state law that mandates earthquake-resistant construction for public school buildings. The Field Act was one of the first pieces of legislation in the United States to mandate earthquake-resistant construction, and had its genesis in the 6.4 magnitude 1933 Long Beach earthquake which occurred on March 10 of that year and destroyed or rendered unsafe 230 school buildings in Southern California.

Many school buildings had completely collapsed due to unreinforced masonry construction and/or shoddy workmanship. The earthquake occurred at 5:55 pm on a Friday, several hours after school had let out. Had the earthquake occurred while school was in session earlier that afternoon, thousands of casualties, mainly children, would have likely occurred. Public awareness of this narrowly averted tragedy led to passage of the Act within 30 days of the quake by the California State Legislature. The Act was named after California Assemblyman Charles Field, the key sponsor of the legislation. The act was based on the research done by San Diego architect Louis John Gill, then president of the California State Board of Architectural Examiners, who traveled to the stricken area within hours of the quake and analyzed the structural failures which had caused buildings to collapse.

== Provisions of the Act ==
The Field Act was introduced with other laws that banned the construction of unreinforced masonry buildings, and required that earthquake forces be taken into account in structural design (specifically, a new requirement for a base shear calculation, and that school buildings must be able to withstand lateral forces equal to at least 3% of the building total mass).

The Act also established the Office of the State Architect (now Division of the State Architect or DSA) which developed design standards, quality control procedures, and required that schools be designed by registered architects and engineers. These professionals must submit their plans and specifications to the State Architect for review and approval prior to construction. The same professionals were also required by the Act to periodically inspect the construction while underway and verify that the actual work completed is in compliance with the approved drawings. Peer review was also introduced as another quality control procedure.

== The Garrison Act ==
In 1939 the Garrison Act applied Field Act Standards to existing school buildings. The first real world test of the Field Act took place in the 1940 Imperial Valley earthquake. This earthquake was magnitude 6.9 (larger than the Long Beach earthquake) but the 16 post Field Act school buildings subjected to intense shaking suffered damage that was less than 1% of their valuation. Older pre Field Act structures in contrast suffered damaged equal to 29% of their valuation.

== The Greene Acts ==
Although the benefits of the Field Act were clearly demonstrated by this event, many districts still delayed inspecting or renovating older pre-Field Act structures. As a result, the first and second Greene Acts (named for their author, State Senator Leroy F. Greene), were passed in 1967 and 1968 respectively to set inspection deadline for school districts. The 1971 San Fernando earthquake spurred the State Legislature to provide additional funding to retrofit older buildings.

== Current application ==
As of 2010, the Field Act currently applies to the design, construction and renovation of all K–12 school buildings and community college buildings in California. Although there have been attempts to make private schools comply with the provision of the Field Act, they are currently exempt. The DSA remains the primary enforcement body, and also provides limited review of university buildings, primarily for disabled access issues. Since 1940, no building constructed under the Field Act has either partially or completely collapsed, and no students have been killed or injured in a Field Act compliant building.

== See also ==
- List of earthquakes in California
- List of earthquakes in the United States
