= La Jolla Recreational Center =

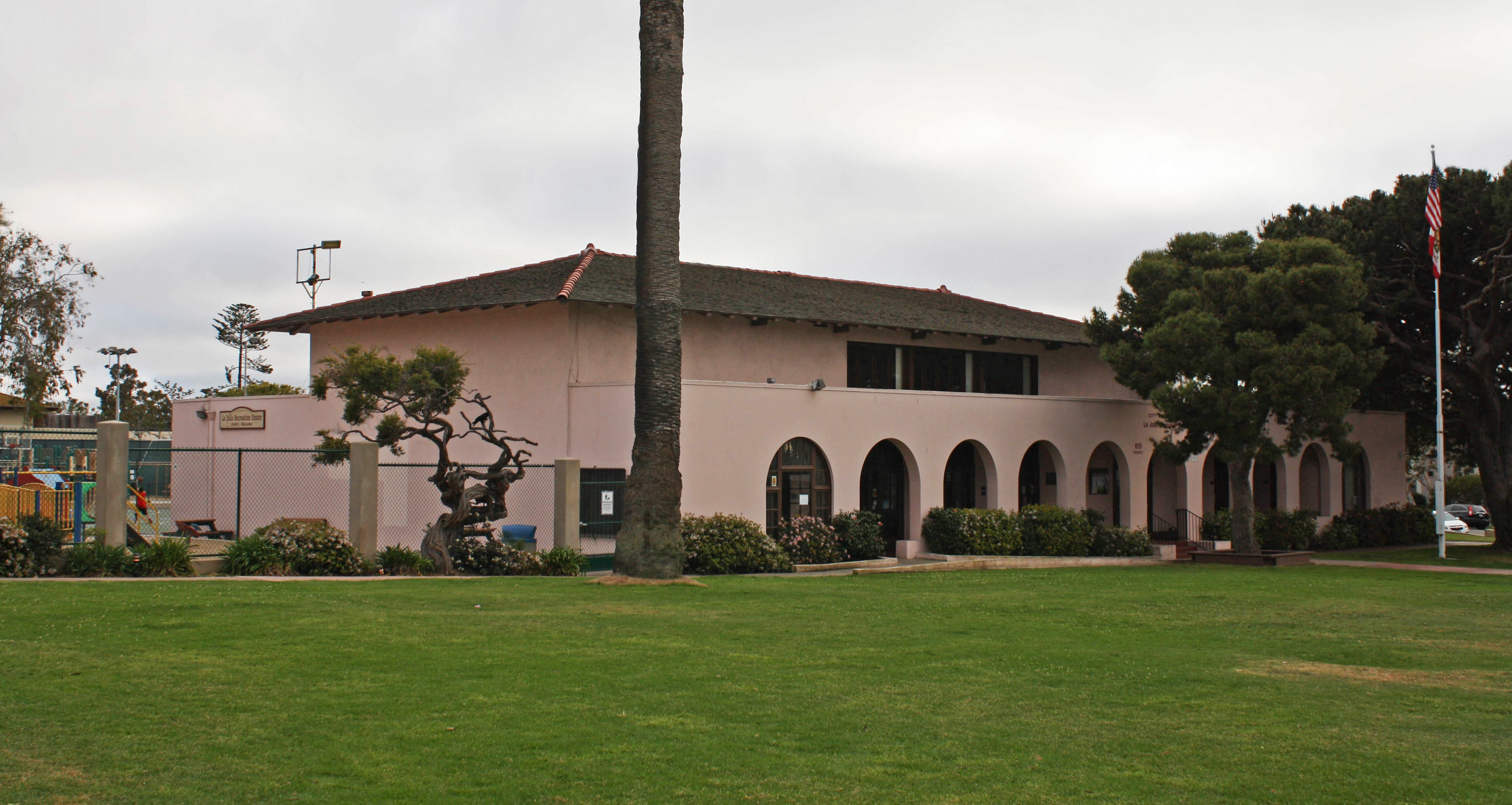
- The La Jolla Recreation Center in 2013
- Interactive map of the La Jolla Recreational Center area
- Alternative names: La Jolla Recreation Center

General information
- Location: 615 Prospect St., San Diego, California, U.S.
- Coordinates: 32.84336°N 117.27782°W
- Inaugurated: July 3, 1915

Design and construction
- Architect: Irving Gill

The La Jolla Recreational Center is a historic recreation center in the La Jolla neighborhood of San Diego, California, United States. It was commissioned by philanthropist Ellen Browning Scripps on property adjacent to her home, and designed by San Diego architect Irving Gill. The center was completed in 1915; Scripps donated it to the City of San Diego the same year. On September 7, 1973, it was designated as San Diego Historic Landmark #86.

== History ==
The facility was originally called the Children's Playground and Recreation Center and has always included a children's play area as well as the recreation center building. It was dedicated on July 3, 1915. Scripps stipulated in the gift bequest that the building must be open to any person, regardless of "race, creed or opinions." The first recreation director, Archibald Talbot, was hired in 1919 and remained until 1952. He and his wife, Agnes, developed a vigorous program of sports, particularly baseball and tennis.

== Current status ==
The center is now known as the La Jolla Recreation Center and is operated by the City of San Diego. The building's appearance has not been substantially altered from the 1915 original. In addition to hosting a variety of sports and recreation programs, it is the meeting place for many civic groups including the La Jolla Town Council and the La Jolla Community Planning Group.

On July 25, 2015, the center celebrated its 100th anniversary. The director of the La Jolla Recreation Council commented, "The Rec Center has always been a great place. It’s a centerpoint for La Jolla. Generations of people have grown up here and had their children play — and their children’s children play here. And that’s what Ellen Browning Scripps wanted, to let children have fun."

== See also ==
- List of San Diego Historical Landmarks in La Jolla
