= Irving Gill =

American architect (1870–1936)

Irving John Gill
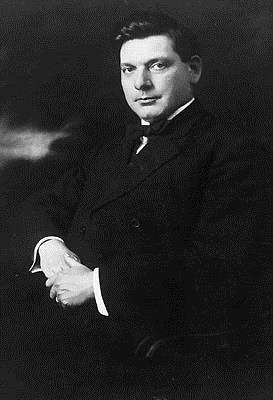
- Gill, c. 1910
- Born: April 26, 1870; Tully, New York, U.S.
- Died: October 7, 1936 (aged 66); Carlsbad, California, U.S.
- Occupation: Architect
- Spouse: Marion Waugh Brashears
- Buildings: Granger Hall; Dodge House; La Jolla Recreational Center; Old Scripps Building

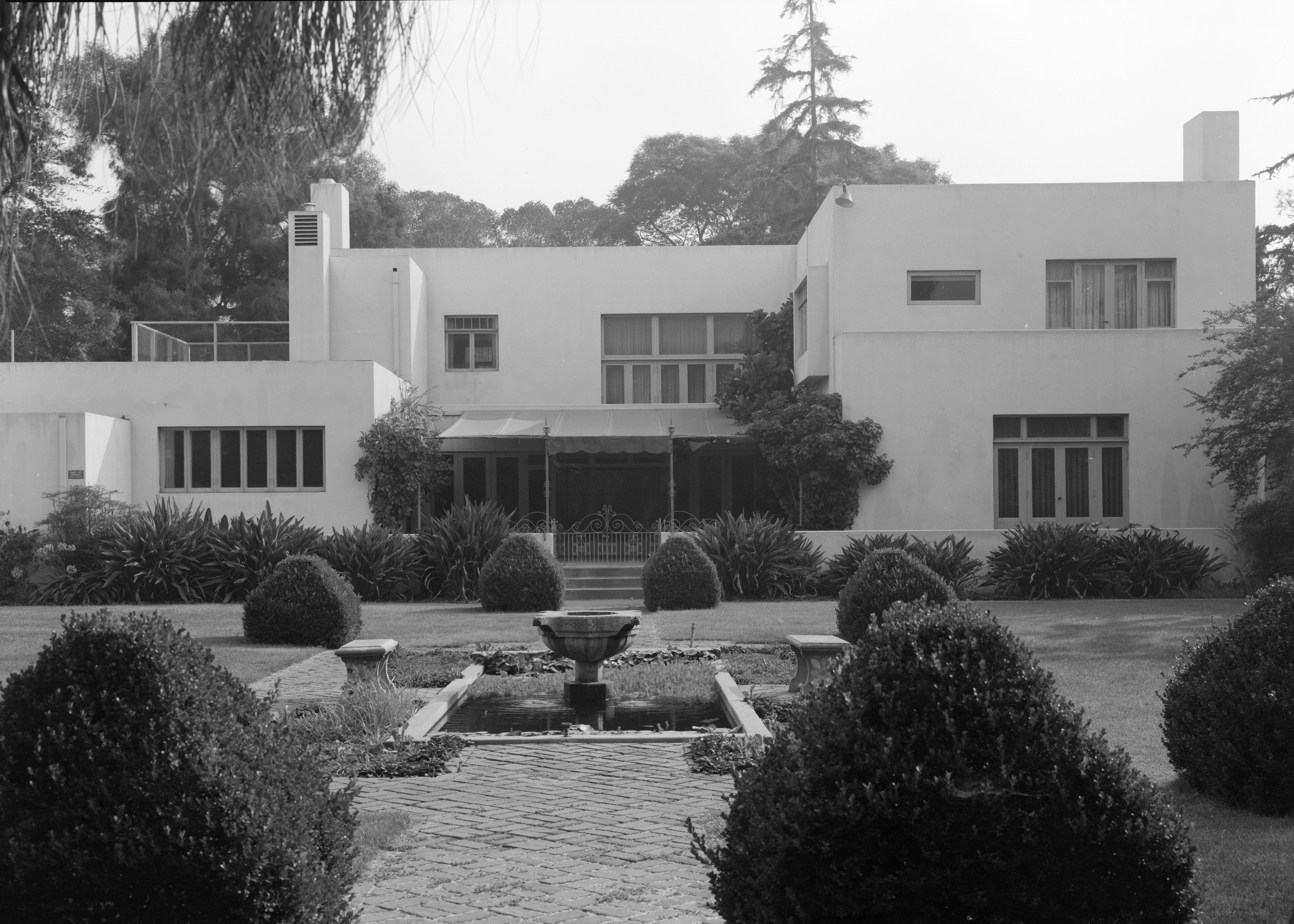
Dodge House, West Hollywood, CA, 1914-16 (demolished)

Irving John Gill (April 26, 1870 – October 7, 1936), was an American architect, known professionally as Irving J. Gill. He did most of his work in Southern California, especially in San Diego and Los Angeles. He is considered a pioneer of the modern movement in architecture. Twelve of his buildings throughout Southern California are listed on the National Register of Historic Places, and many others are designated as historic by local governments.

== Early life ==
Gill was born on April 26, 1870, in Tully, New York, to Joseph and Cynthia Scullen Gill. His father was a farmer, and later a carpenter. As a child, Gill attended the Madison Street School in Syracuse.

By 1889, Gill was working as a draftsman under Ellis G. Hall in Syracuse. Then, in 1890, he moved to Chicago to work with Joseph Lyman Silsbee, who was Hall's partner years prior. Finally, in 1891, Gill went to Adler and Sullivan. His apprenticeship there coincided with several important Chicago School architects including Frank Lloyd Wright. While there, he worked on the Transportation Building, an exhibition hall at the 1893 Chicago World's Fair. Long after his death it was claimed that Gill never saw the end of that project due to illness. The veracity of this claim has never been documented and is highly unlikely. In 1893, the year of the Fair, he moved to San Diego to open his own architectural practice.

== Career ==
Once Gill settled in San Diego, his health improved, and he began an architectural practice of his own. Though he was reported to have been working around this time, records of his projects were not well preserved.

In 1894, Gill partnered with Joseph Falkenham, who had built a successful practice of his own. The two formed a firm named "Falkenham & Gill, the Architects", and completed several projects, including some large commercial buildings.

Falkenham left San Diego in 1895, and Gill began to take on large residential projects for important figures in San Diego. He also worked on the Granger Hall for Ralph Granger, a local musician.

In the late 1890s, Gill's designs began to use concrete more heavily, and his work in that medium contributed significantly to its use in the future.

In 1896, he formed a partnership with William S. Hebbard. The Hebbard & Gill firm was known for work in the Tudor Revival and later the Prairie School styles. The George W. Marston House (now a museum) was their most famous project. In this period, Gill trained Hazel Wood Waterman, who helped with a group of houses built near Balboa Park for socialites Alice Lee and Katherine Teats. Waterman later went on to become an architect with her own practice.

After California passed a law requiring architects to obtain a certificate in 1901, Gill was automatically granted a certificate because his practice was already in operation.

In 1903, Gill was appointed to a special seat on a Chamber of Commerce committee to build the U.S. Grant Hotel, which was ultimately designed by Harrison Albright, despite Hebbard & Gill's submission of designs to the committee.

In 1907, Gill was accused of unauthorized work on a sewer line, causing a clog. Gill denied the accusations, but his partnership with Hebbard was damaged beyond repair. Less than a month later, Gill entered into a partnership with Frank Mead, who had been a Hebbard & Gill employee. The partnership lasted seven months, and completed only a few houses.

Gill designed the Broadway Fountain, also known as the Electric Fountain, in 1908, for the center of Horton Plaza Park, in downtown San Diego. Though designed in the prime of his Modernist period, its revivalist style is atypical of his work. Gill's design was chosen in a competition among professional architects, and was one of the first projects in the country to combine water and colored electrical light effects.

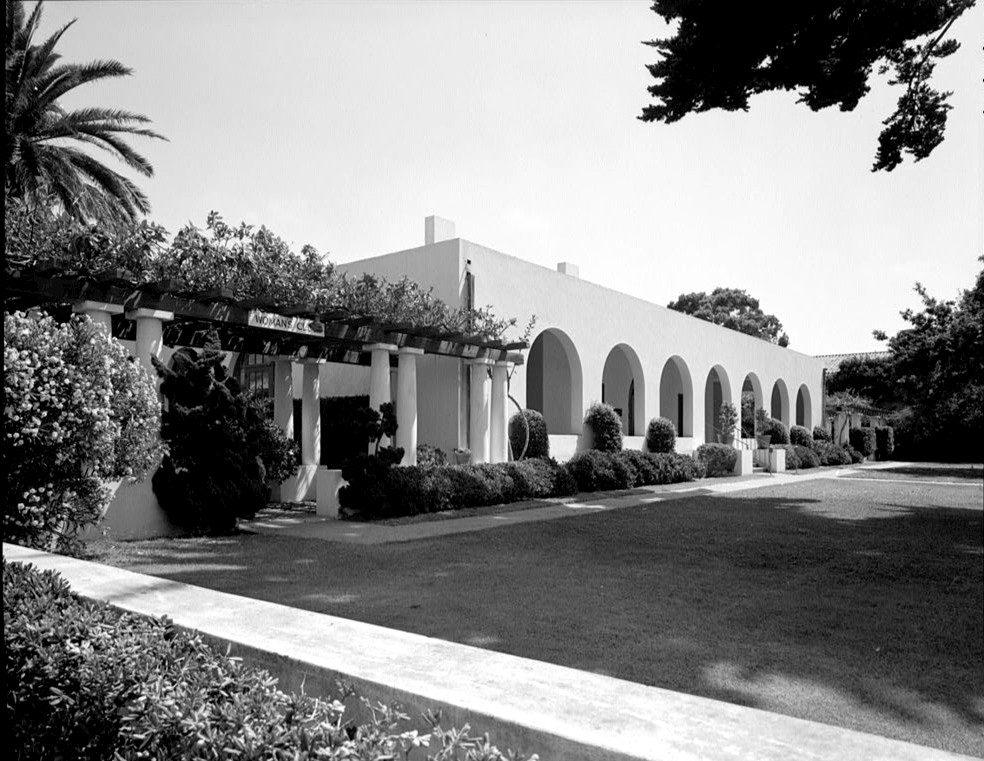
La Jolla Woman's Club (photo taken 1971)

In 1911, Gill's nephew, Louis John Gill, joined his firm as a draftsman. That same year, Gill lost an important commission for the 1915 Panama–California Exposition to Bertram Goodhue. He did work for a time as an associate of Goodhue, including the design of the Balboa Park Administration Building, Balboa Park's first structure, which is located just outside the California Quadrangle. Today, it is known as the Gill Administration Building of the San Diego Museum of Man, and houses offices and the Gill Auditorium.

Gill was commissioned by Ellen Browning Scripps in 1913 to design the La Jolla Woman's Club. In its construction, he used a "tilt-slab" construction technique to assemble the exterior arcade walls on site. The result is California's first tilt-up concrete building. These walls integrate hollow, clay-block infill to lighten the slab's weight. For the interior walls and central "pop-up" volume, however, he employed conventional balloon-frame construction. Though Gill is often associated with the tilt-up method, he used it in only a handful of structures. Shortly thereafter, in 1914, he accepted his nephew Louis as a partner.

After this time, Gill began living and working mainly in Los Angeles County, although the Gill & Gill partnership lasted until 1919. Multiple projects for the fledgling city of Torrance may have prompted the move. Gill returned to live in North San Diego County in the 1920s, but his pace of work slowed considerably due to lingering illness, changing public tastes, and his diminishing willingness to compromise with clients. After the late 1920s, his work added Art Deco or "Moderne" touches.

In the late 1920s, Gill produced several civic buildings for the city of Oceanside, California. This would be his final large project. His last contract was to create houses for several displaced Native American families who would then settle at the Rancho Barona Indian Reservation near Lakeside, California.

== Importance ==
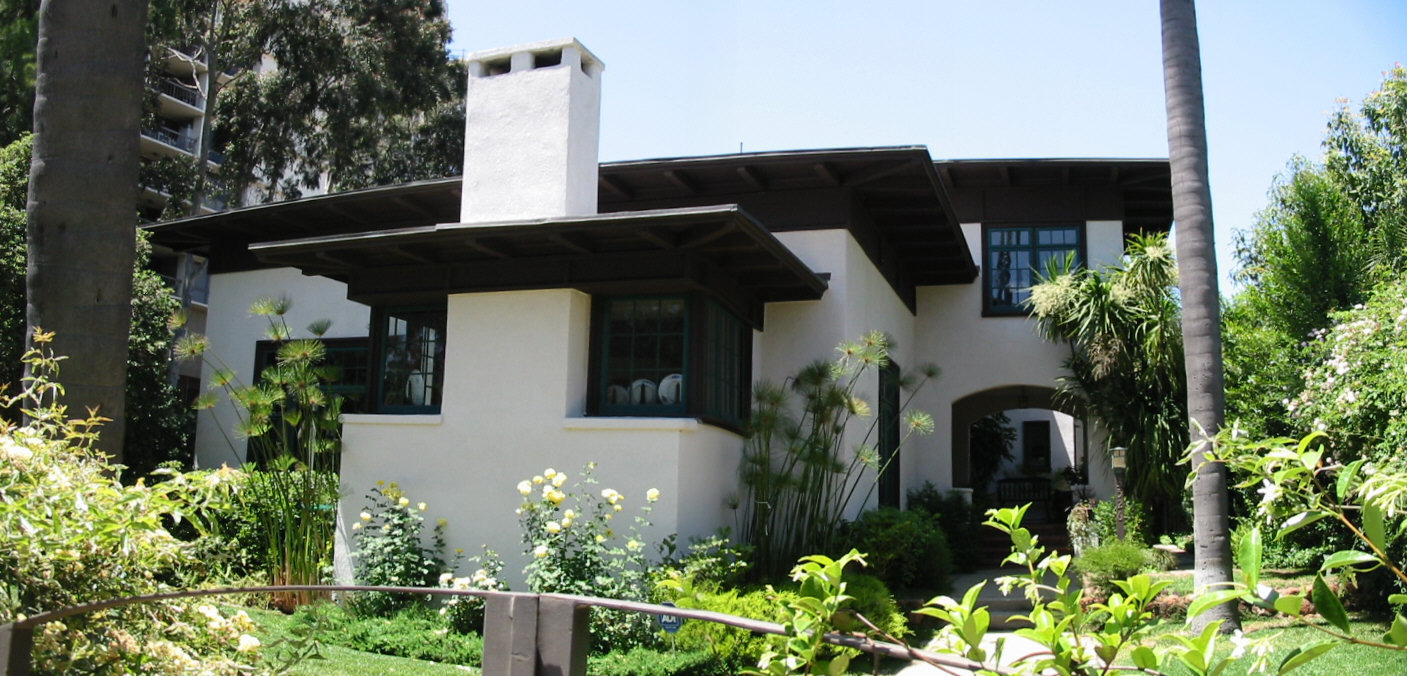
Cossitt House, San Diego, California

Irving Gill was concerned with the social impact of good architecture and approached his projects with equal skill and interest, whether he was designing for bankers and mayors or for Indian reservations, an African American church, or migrant Mexican workers and their children.

Gill's architecture established "a new beginning in life and art" and represented a "grand rejection" of the common "architectural mise en scene from other times and places," according to historian Kevin Starr. His work was described as "cubist" in publications of the time.

Gill's interiors were concerned with removing most unnecessary detailing, partly for reasons of economy and hygiene. His houses are known for minimal or flush mouldings; simple (or no) fireplace mantles; coved, and therefore fluid, floor-to-wall transitions; enclosed-side bathtubs; plentiful skylights;, plastered walls with only occasional, but featured, wood elements; flush five-piece doors; concrete or Sorel cement floors; and a general avoidance of dividing lines, ledges, and unnecessary material changes. According to Joseph Giovannini, "the desire for an easily maintained, sanitary home drove Gill's aesthetic toward purity."

Gill's aesthetically best work, much of it dating from the 1910s, favors flat roofs without eaves, a unity of materials (mostly concrete), casement windows with transoms, white or near-white exterior and interior walls, cubic or rectangular massing, plentiful ground-level arches or series of arches creating transitional breezeways in the manner of the California missions.

His best-known work still in active use today includes the Ellen Browning Scripps residence (now the Museum of Contemporary Art San Diego), the earliest buildings of The Bishop's School, the La Jolla Woman's Club, the La Jolla Recreation Center and the George W. Marston House. He designed ten churches, of which the best known is the Christian Science Church at Second and Laurel Streets in San Diego. The Woman's Club and Marston House are among those listed on the National Register of Historic Places (NRHP).

Despite frequent recent references to Gill as "forgotten" or "unappreciated," he was reasonably well documented during his life. For example, his work was more frequently published in Gustav Stickley's "Craftsman" magazine than any other Western architect, including the Greene & Greene firm.

Gill's reputation did quickly fade after his death, and it languished until he was included in the 1960 book Five California Architects by Esther McCoy and Randell L. Makinson. This book (still in print) helped to renew interest in his work, and in early California architecture in general. In the decades since its publication Irving Gill has come to be recognized as a major figure in the modern movement.

== Personal life ==
On May 28, 1928, at the age of 58, Gill married for the first and only time. His wife was Marion Waugh Brashears. While some have speculated that the marriage was unsuccessful, a few remaining letters in Gill's own hand indicate his deep and fond feelings for his wife. Gill was alone on his wife's family ranch in Carlsbad, California when he died on October 7, 1936.

== Works ==
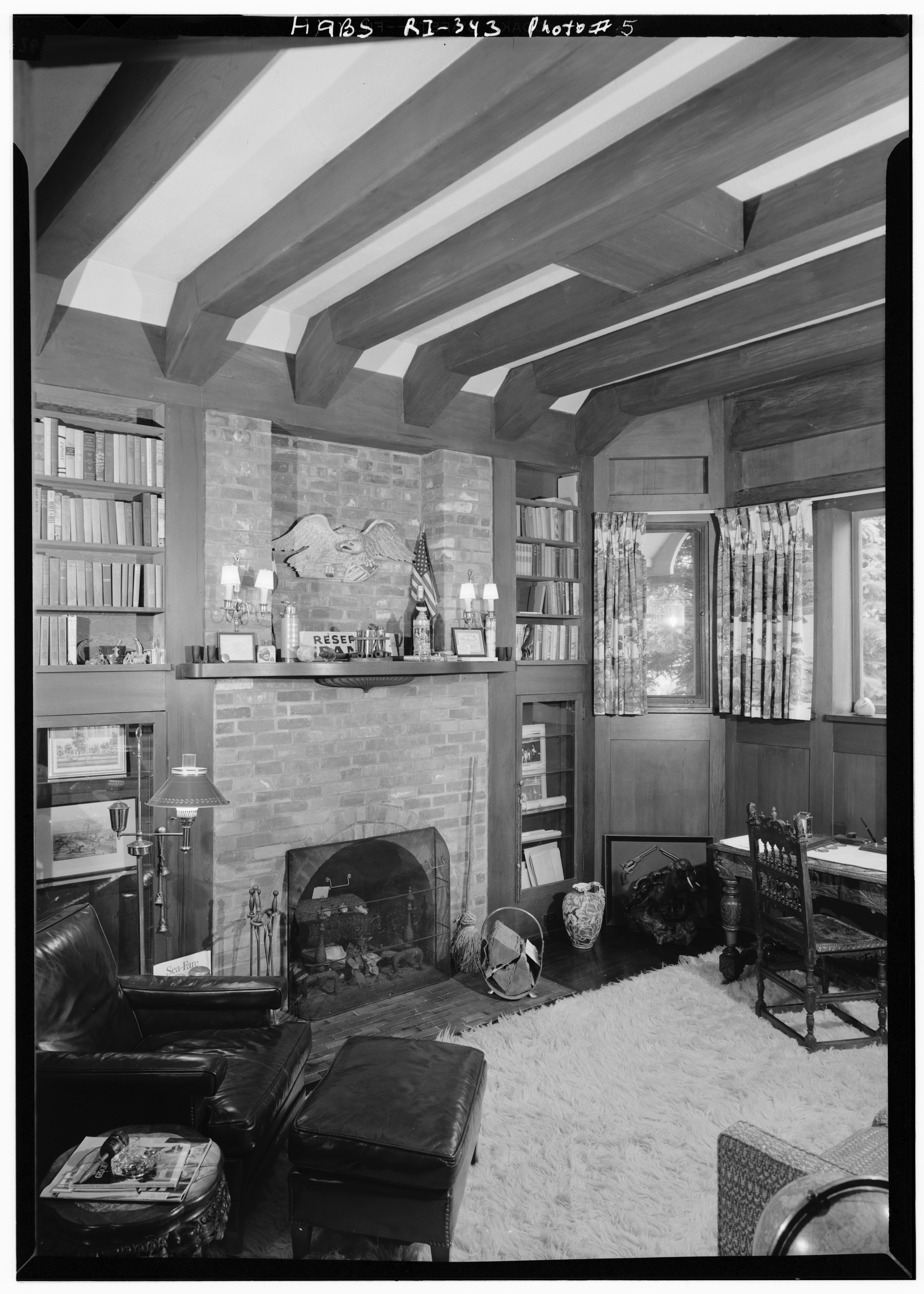
Study (room), Wildacre, Ocean Drive, Newport, Newport County, RI

Selected works by Gill include:

- Maj. Myles Moylan House, San Diego, 1894, with co-architect Falkenhan, NRHP-listed
- Granger Hall, National City, 1898, NRHP-listed
- Wildacre, Newport, RI, 1901, NRHP-listed
- Sunnyslope Lodge, San Diego, 1902, NRHP-listed
- George W. Marston House, San Diego, 1904–05, NRHP-listed
- Alice Lee House, San Diego, 1905–06
- Katherine Teats House, San Diego, 1906
- Burnham-Marston House, San Diego, 1907, with co-architect William Sterling Hebbard, NRHP-listed
- Old Scripps Building, San Diego, 1908, NRHP-listed
- Horton Plaza Fountain, San Diego, 1909
- Cossitt Cottages (4), San Diego, 1910
- F. B. Lewis Courts (aka Bella Vista Terrace), Sierra Madre, 1910
- First Church of Christ, Scientist, San Diego, 1909-1910
- Miltimore House, South Pasadena, 1911, NRHP-listed
- Administration Building for the Panama California Exposition, now called the Gill Auditorium, San Diego, 1912, later modified by architect Carleton Winslow, NRHP-listed
- La Jolla Woman's Club, San Diego, 1912, NRHP-listed
- earliest buildings at The Bishop's School, San Diego, 1912
- Ellen Browning Scripps residence, now the Museum of Contemporary Art San Diego, San Diego, 1913
- Pacific Electric Railroad Bridge, Torrance, 1913, NRHP-listed
- Etiwanda Depot, Rancho Cucamonga, California, 1914, NRHP-listed
- La Jolla Recreational Center, San Diego, 1915
- Walter L. Dodge House, West Hollywood, 1916, destroyed 1970
- Samuel Raymond House, Bluff Park, Long Beach, 1918
- Clarke Estate, Santa Fe Springs, 1919, NRHP-listed
- Horatio West Court, Santa Monica, 1919, NRHP-listed
- Americanization School, Oceanside, 1931, NRHP-listed
- Oceanside City Hall and Fire Station, Oceanside, 1934, NRHP-listed

== Other sources ==
- Guthrie, James B. "Tony Garnier & Irving J. Gill." In Tony Garnier, L’Air Du Temps; edited by Catherine Chambon, 149-153. Lyon, France: Musée Urbain Tony Garnier, 2019.
- Hargreaves, Rev. Dr. Mark (2023). The Sacred Architecture of Irving J. Gill. Irving J. Gill Foundation. ISBN 979-8385902972.
- Hines, Thomas S. (2000). Irving Gill and the Architecture of Reform: A Study in Modernist Architectural Culture. Monacelli. ISBN 1-58093-016-6.
- Kamerling, Bruce (1993). Irving J. Gill, Architect. San Diego Historical Society. ISBN 0-918740-16-9.
- McCoy, Esther (1960). Five California Architects. Reinhold Publishing.
  - reprinted in 1975 by Praeger
- McCoy, Esther (2020). One California Architect, Irving J. Gill. Irving J. Gill Foundation. ISBN 979-8831113990.
