= Warren (name) =

Warren (/ˈwɒrən/) is a common English and Irish surname and a masculine given name derived from the Norman family "de Warenne" (see De Warenne family), a reference to a place called Varenne, a hamlet near Arques-la-Bataille, along the river Varenne (Warinna in Medieval documents) in Normandy. The river name is thought to be derived from the continental Old Celtic Var- / Ver- "water, river", with a Germanic influence on the initial V- > W- after Warinna, from the Proto-Germanic war-, meaning "to protect or defend".

Notable people with the name include:

== Surname ==
=== A ===
- Alan Warren (priest) (1932–2020), Anglican priest and author
- Alan Warren (sailor) (born 1935), British sailor
- Alfred Warren (1856–1927), British Conservative member of Parliament
- Allan Warren, English photographer
- Amanda Warren (born 1982), American actress
- Andy Warren (British musician)
- Andy Warren (Canadian musician)
- Andrew Warren (disambiguation)
- Arnold Warren, English athlete
- Art Warren (born 1993), American baseball player
- Austin Warren (disambiguation)

=== B ===
- Barney E. Warren (1867–1951), American Christian hymnwriter and minister
- Ben Warren (disambiguation)
- Bill Warren (disambiguation)
- Bryson Warren (born 2004), American basketball player

=== C ===
- C. Denier Warren, American-born actor
- Caroline Matilda Warren, American educator, novelist and children's writer
- Carter Warren (born 1999), American football player
- Charles Warren, British general and Commissioner of Police of the Metropolis in London
- Charles Marquis Warren, American film producer, writer and director
- Chris Warren (disambiguation)
- Clem Warren, (1899–1956), English footballer
- Constance Warren (1905–1984), English composer and pianist
- Constance Whitney Warren (1888–1948), American sculptor
- Curtis Warren (born 1963), British criminal

=== D ===
- Dale Warren, American musician and arranger
- Darren Warren, American country music singer
- David Warren (disambiguation)
- Davis Warren (born 2002), American football player
- Des Warren, British trade unionist
- Diane Warren, American songwriter
- Dianne Warren, Canadian author
- Don Warren, American football player

=== E ===
- Earl Warren (1891–1974), Chief Justice of the United States
- Earl W. Warren (1902–1972), American politician
- Earle Warren (1914–1994), American musician
- Ed Warren (1926–2006), American demonologist and paranormal investigator
- Edward Warren (disambiguation)
- Eleanor Warren (cellist) (1919–2005), British cellist and music producer
- Elinor Remick Warren (1900–1991), American composer and pianist
- Elizabeth Warren (born 1949), U.S. senator from Massachusetts and former law professor
- Emily Warren (disambiguation)
- Estella Warren, Canadian actress

=== F ===
- Fiske Warren, American businessman
- Fran Warren (1926–2013), American popular music singer
- Francis E. Warren (1844–1929), American politician; first governor of Wyoming
- Francis Purcell Warren (1895–1916), violinist and composer, killed at The Battle of the Somme.
- Frank Warren (disambiguation)
- Fred Warren (footballer, born 1907), Welsh international football player
- Frederick Warren (1775–1848), Royal Navy officer
- Fuller Warren, governor of Florida

=== G ===
- Gavin Warren (born 2008), American actor
- George T. Warren, American politician
- Gouverneur K. Warren, Union general in the American Civil War
- Guy Warren (1923–2008), Ghanaian musician

=== H ===
- Harriet Merrick Warren (1843–1893), American editor
- Harry Warren, American songwriter
- Henry E. Warren (1872–1957), American inventor
- Henry White Warren (1831–1912), American bishop

=== I ===
- Israel Perkins Warren (1814–1892), American minister

=== J ===
- James Warren (disambiguation)
- Jaylen Warren (born 1998), American football player
- Jenny Warren, American singer
- Jim Warren (disambiguation)
- John Warren (disambiguation)
- Sir John Borlase Warren, 1st Baronet, English admiral, politician and diplomat
- Joseph Warren (disambiguation)
- Josiah Warren, American inventor, musician, and anarchist author

=== K ===
- Kenneth Warren (disambiguation)

=== L ===
- Lella Warren (1899–1982), American novelist and short story writer
- Leonard Warren, American baritone
- Lesley Ann Warren, American actress and singer
- Leslie Warren (1899–?), British soldier
- Lillie Eginton Warren (1858–1910), American educator, author, inventor
- Linda Warren, American author

=== M ===
- Marc Warren (disambiguation)
- Marcia Warren (born 1943), English actress
- Marshall Warren (born 2001), American ice hockey player
- Mary Evalin Warren (1829–1904), American author, lecturer, social reformer
- Matthew Warren (1642–1706), English minister
- Mercy Otis Warren (1728–1814), American writer
- Michael Warren II (born 1998), American football player
- Michael Warren (actor) (born 1946), American actor and basketball player
- Minton Warren (1850–1907), American classical scholar
- Moses Warren (1779–1845), New York politician

=== N ===
- Nancy Warren (baseball), All-American Girls Professional Baseball League pitcher

=== P ===
- Pat Warren (born 1936), American romantic novelist under the pseudonym Patricia Cox
- Pierre Warren, American football player

=== R ===
- Ray Warren, Australian sports commentator
- Ray Warren (footballer), English football player
- Raymond Warren (disambiguation)
- Rebecca Warren (born 1965), British visual artist and sculptor
- Richard Warren (disambiguation)
- Rick Warren (born 1954), Christian author and pastor
- Robert Penn Warren, American poet
- Rosa Warrens (1821–1878), Swedish poet and translator
- Rusty Warren (1955–2021), American comedian and singer

=== S ===
- Samuel Warren (disambiguation)
- Setti Warren (1970–2025), American politician
- Storm Warren (born 1988), American basketball player
- Sue Allen Warren (1917–1997), American clinical psychologist and educator

=== T ===
- T. J. Warren (born 1993), American basketball player
- T. Raymond Warren, North Carolina politician
- Thomas Warren (disambiguation)
- Tommy Warren, Major League Baseball pitcher
- Tish Harrison Warren (born 1979), American author and Anglican priest
- Tony Warren (1936–2016), English scriptwriter, originator of Coronation Street
- Ty Warren (born 1981), American football player
- Tyler Warren (born 2002), American football player

=== V ===
- Vince Warren, American football player

=== X ===
- Xavier Warren, Model, Rugby Prospect

=== W ===
- W. Rice Warren (1885–1969), American sports coach and physician
- Will, Willie and William Warren (disambiguation)
- Willie D. Warren (1924–2000), American electric blues guitarist, bass player and singer

=== Z ===
- Zach Warren (born 1981), American circus performer and psychologist

== Given name ==
Warren
- Pronunciation: /ˈwɒrən/
- Gender: Male

Origin
- Origin: Teutonic
- Meaning: "Enclosure" or "from La Varrene"

=== A ===
- Warren Adelson (born 1942), American art dealer and art historian
- Warren Allmand (1932–2016), Canadian politician and human rights activist

=== B ===
- Warren Barton (born 1969), English footballer
- Warren Beatty (born 1937), American actor
- Warren Wallace Beckwith (1874–1955), Lincoln family member
- Warren Benbow (1954–2024), American jazz drummer
- Warren Berlinger (1937–2020), American actor
- Warren Bird (born 1956), American writer and researcher
- Warren Eugene Brandon (1916–1977), California painter and photographer
- Warren Brinson (born 2002), American football player
- Warren Brown (disambiguation)
- Warren Buffett (born 1930), American investor, businessman, and philanthropist
- Warren E. Burger (1907–1995), Chief Justice of the United States

=== C ===
- Warren Christopher (1925–2011), U.S. Secretary of State
- Warren Clarke (1947–2014), English actor
- Warren Coniam, Canadian motorsport racer
- Warren Cromartie (born 1953), American baseball player
- Warren Cuccurullo (born 1956), musician

=== D ===
- Warren DeMartini (born 1963), musician

=== E ===
- Warren Ellis (born 1968), comic book writer, novelist, and screenwriter
- Warren Ellis (musician), musician
- Warren Ewens, Australian biologist and statistician

=== F ===
- Warren Farrell (born 1943), American educator, activist, and author on gender issues
- Warren Feeney, Northern Ireland international footballer
- Warren Foegele, Canadian ice hockey player
- Warren Furman, former UK Gladiator
- Warren Fury, Wales international rugby union player

=== G ===
- Warren Gatland (born 1963), New Zealand rugby union coach
- Warren Giese (1924–2013), American football player and coach
- Warren Giles (1896–1979), American baseball executive
- Warren Gill (1878–1952), American baseball player
- Warren C. Gill (1912–1987), American Coast Guardsman and politician
- Warren Griffin III (born 1970), stage name Warren G, American rapper
- Warren Groen, American politician
- Warren Gulley (1922–2012), American Marine and WHMO administrator

=== H ===
- Warren Ham (born 1957), American musician
- Warren G. Harding (1865–1923), President of the United States
- Warren Hastings (1732–1818), first Governor-General of India
- Warren Haynes (born 1960), American rock and blues guitarist
- Warren Hull (1903–1974), actor and television personality

=== I ===
- Warren Ingersoll (1908–1995), American hockey player
- Warren Isaac (born 1943), American basketball player

=== J ===
- Warren Jeffs (born 1955), American Fundamental Mormon leader and convicted pedophile
- Warren Joyce (born 1965), English football manager

=== K ===
- Warren Kamanzi (born 2000), Norwegian footballer
- Warren Kampf (born 1967), American politician
- Warren Kasch (1903–1965), American sports coach, athletics administrator, educator
- Warren Kennedy (born 1980), South African horse racing jockey
- Warren Kilbourne (1916–1967), American football player
- Warren Kimbro (1934–2009), American murderer
- Warren King (cartoonist) (1916–1978), American cartoonist
- Warren Kinsella (born 1960), Canadian political adviser and commentator
- Warren Kinston (born 1945), Australian scientist, doctor and entrepreneur
- Warren Kitzmiller (1943–2022), American politician
- Warren Klawiter (born c. 1943), American football coach
- Warren Klein (born 1944), American musician and songwriter
- Warren P. Knowles (1908–1993), American politician
- Warren Koegel (born 1949), American football player
- Warren Kozak (born 1951), American journalist and author
- Warren Kremer (1921–2003), American comic creator

=== L ===
- Warren Lahr (1923–1969), American football player
- Warren L. Lane (1805–1861), American politician
- Warren Lawrence (born 2003), Dominican swimmer
- Warren Lees (born 1952), New Zealand cricketer
- Warren Leslie (1927–2011), American writer
- Warren Lichtenstein (born 1965), American businessman
- Warren Limmer (born 1955), American politician
- Warren Linn (born 1954), New Zealand cricketer
- Warren Lipka (born 1964), American soccer player
- Warren Lisle (died 1788), British Member of Parliament
- Warren Littlefield (born 1952), American television executive
- Warren Livingston (born 1938), American football player
- Warren Livingstone (born 1973), Australian businessman
- Warren Loving (born 1960), American football player
- Warren Luff (born 1976), Australian racing driver

=== M ===
- Warren Macdonald (born 1965), handicapped mountain climber
- Warren McClendon (born 2001), American football player
- Warren Miller (disambiguation), several people
- Warren Mitchell (1926–2015), English actor
- Warren Moon (born 1956), American-Canadian football player
- Warren "Pete" Moore (1938–2017), singer for The Miracles
- Warren Chisha Mwambazi (born 1978), Zambian politician

=== N ===
- Warren Neidich (born 1958), American artist
- Warren Nelson (born 1950), American businessman
- Warren Newson (born 1964), American baseball player
- Warren D. Niederhauser (1918–2005), American chemist
- Warren Niesłuchowski (1946–2019), American-Polish artist, writer, editor, and translator
- Warren Noble (inventor)
- Warren Norman (born 1990), American football player
- Warren Norman (psychologist) (1930–1998), American psychologist
- Warren John Nutter (1937–2021), American murderer

=== O ===
- Warren O'Hora (born 1999), Irish footballer
- Warren Oakes (born 1981), American drummer
- Warren Oates (1928–1982), American actor

=== P ===
- Warren Page (1910–1977), American hunter and outdoor writer
- Warren Parr (born 1952), Australian hurdler
- Warren Patmore (born 1971), English association footballer
- Warren M. Persons (1878–1937), American economist
- Warren Petersen (born 1976), American politician
- Warren C. Philbrook (1857–1933), American judge
- Warren Pickering (born 1983), Australian politician
- Warren Pitt (1948–2025), Australian politician
- Warren Platner (1919–2006), American architect and interior designer
- Warren Plunkett (1920–2018), American football player and judge
- Warren R. Porter (1861-1927), American politician
- Warren Powers (1941–2021), American football player and coach
- Warren Powers (defensive end) (born 1965), American football player

=== R ===
- Warren Rodwell, Australian former soldier, academic, hostage survivor, and songwriter

=== S ===
- Warren Sapp, American football player
- Warren Shankland (born 1987), South African cricketer
- Warren Spahn (1921–2003), American baseball player
- Warren Spector, game designer
- Warren Stevens (1919–2012), American actor

=== T ===
- Warren Terhune (1869–1920), 13th governor of American Samoa
- Warren T. Thayer (1869–1956), American politician
- Warren Tolman (born 1959), former Massachusetts senator and state representative
- Warren W. Tolman (1861–1940), justice of the Washington Supreme Court
- Warren Toole (1893–1972), American lawyer and public official
- Warren Truitt (1849–1935), American lawyer, politician, and judge

=== U ===
- Warren Ukah (born 1985), American soccer player
- Warren Unna (1923–2017), American journalist
- Warren Upham (1850–1934), American geologist
- Warren Upton (1919–2024), World War II veteran and Pearl Harbor survivor
- Warren Keith Urbom (1925–2017), American judge

=== V ===
- Warren Vaché Jr. (born 1951), American jazz trumpeter, cornetist and flugelhornist
- Warren Vaché Sr. (1914–2005), American jazz musician
- Warren Vanders (1930–2009), American actor
- Warren Vertress (1827–1898), American politician
- Warren H. Vinton (1825–1907), American politician

=== W ===
- Warren Wilhelm Jr., birth name of Bill De Blasio, American politician
- Warren William (1894–1948), American actor
- Warren B. Wilson (1920–1997), American painter
- Warren Elvin Wilson, American civil engineer and college administrator
- Warren Griffin Wilson (1934–2024), American journalist
- Warren Hugh Wilson (1867–1937), American rural sociologist

=== Y ===
- Warren Ybañez (born 1979), Filipino basketball player
- Warren Young (born 1956), Canadian ice hockey player

=== Z ===
- Warren Zaïre-Emery (born 2006), French footballer
- Warren Zanes (born 1965), American musician and writer
- Warren Zapol (1942–2021), American anesthesiologist
- Warren Zevon (1947–2003), American singer and songwriter

== Fictional characters ==
- Warren Worthington III, also known as Angel or Archangel, a founder X-Men member
- Warren (Porridge), "Bunny" Warren in the TV sitcom Porridge
- Gwen Warren / Spider-Girl, a Marvel Comics superhero and member of the X-Men
- Miles Warren / Jackal, a Marvel Comics supervillain

== See also ==
- Warren (disambiguation)
