= Thomas Warren (disambiguation) =

Thomas Warren (fl. 1727–1767) was an English bookseller, printer, publisher and businessman.

Thomas Warren may also refer to:

- Thomas Warren (cricketer) (1859–1936), English cricketer for Leicestershire
- Thomas Warren (MP) (died 1591), Member of Parliament (MP) for Dover
- Thomas Warren (priest) (1831–1891), Anglican priest
- Thomas Warren (Royal Navy officer) (died 1699), British commodore
- Thomas B. Warren (1920–2000), professor of philosophy of religion and apologetics at the Harding School of Theology in Memphis, Tennessee
- Thomas Herbert Warren (1853–1930), English academic and administrator
- Tom Warren (rugby union) (born 1983), rugby union player
- Tom Warren (triathlete) (born 1943), American triathlete
- Tommy Warren (1917–1968), baseball player
- Tommy G. Warren, American screenwriter, director and producer
- T. Raymond Warren, member of the North Carolina House of Representatives
