= Homer Adkins =

Homer Adkins may refer to:

- Homer Martin Adkins (1890–1964), Governor of Arkansas
- Homer Burton Adkins (1892–1949), American chemist
