= Joe Warren =

Joe Warren may refer to:

- Joe Warren (fighter) (born 1976), Greco-Roman wrestler and mixed martial artist
- Joe Warren (soccer) (born 1974), former American soccer player
- Joseph Warren (Mississippi politician) (born 1952), member of the Mississippi House of Representatives
- Joe Warren (Kansas politician) (1912-2003), Kansas state senator

== See also ==
- Joseph Warren (disambiguation)
