= Joseph Warren (disambiguation) =

Joseph Warren (1741–1775) was an American soldier and doctor.

Joseph Warren may also refer to:

- Joseph A. Warren (1882–1929), New York City Police Commissioner
- Joseph M. Warren (1813–1896), U.S. Representative from New York
- Joseph Warren (music editor) (1804–1881), English musician and composer
- Joseph Warren (Mississippi politician) (born 1952), member of the Mississippi House of Representatives
- Giuseppe Vari (1924–1993), Italian film director, sometimes credited as Joseph Warren

== See also ==
- Joe Warren (disambiguation)
