= List of compositions by William Boyce =

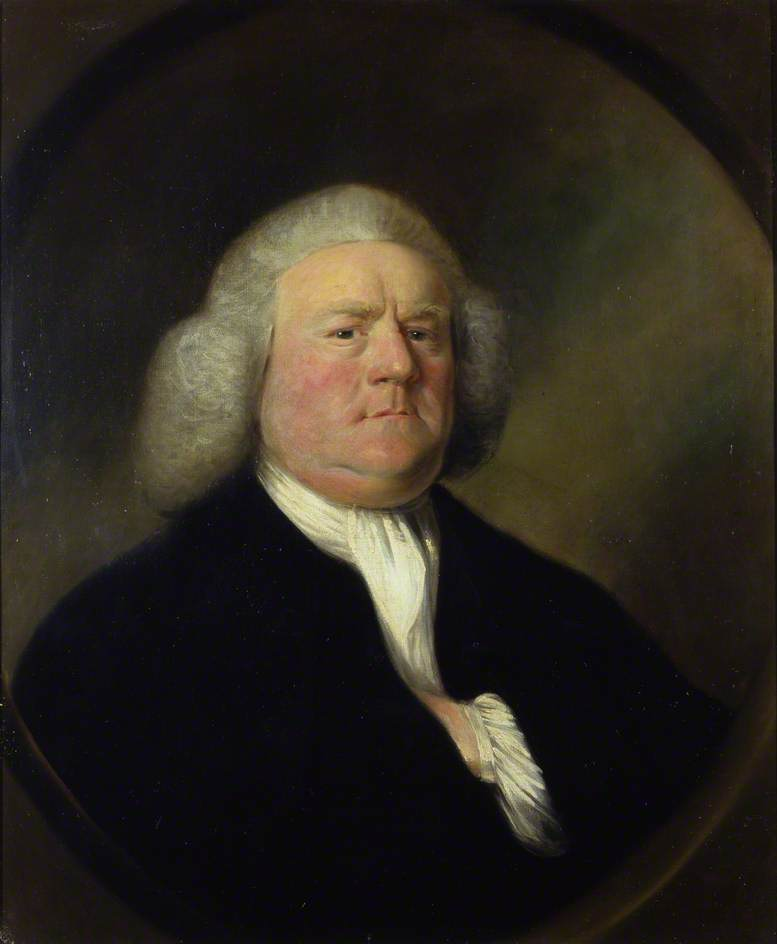
William Boyce (attributed to Mason Chamberlin (1727–1787))

List of compositions by the English composer William Boyce (1711–1779).

== Works ==
=== Vocal music ===
==== Services ====
- Te Deum, G major, verse service (ca. 1725)
- Te Deum and Jubilate, A major, verse service (ca. 1740)
- Te Deum and Jubilate, A major, short service (ca. 1750)
- Burial Service, E minor, 4 voices (1751) for Captain T. Coram, 3 April 1751; ed. by J. Page, in Harmonia sacra, London, 1800
- Te Deum and Jubilate, C major, full service (ca. 1760)
- Kyrie, A major (????)
- Sanctus, A/G major (????)

==== Anthems ====
- Begin unto my God with timbrels, verse (1769 or earlier, lost) text published in A Collection of Anthems used in His Majesty's Chapel Royal, London, 1769
- Behold O God our defender, full (1761) for the coronation of George III, 1761
- Be thou my judge, O Lord, verse (1749 or earlier)
- Blessed is he that considereth the poor, verse (????)
- Blessed is he that considereth the sick, verse, with orchestra (1741; pub. London, 1802)
- Blessed is the man that ferrets the Lord, verse (1736 or earlier)
- Blessing and glory, verse (1769 or earlier)
- By the waters of Babylon, verse (ca. 1740)
- Come, Holy Ghost, full (1761) for the coronation of George III, 1761
- Give the king thy judgements, verse (ca. 1740)
- Give the king thy judgements, verse (ca. 1760)
- Give unto the Lord, O ye mighty, verse (1736 or earlier)
- Great and marvellous are thy works, full (1769 or earlier, lost) text published in A Collection of Anthems used in His Majesty's Chapel Royal, London, 1769
- Hear my crying, verse (ca. 1740)
- Hear my prayer, full, with orchestra (ca. 1760)
- The heavens declare the glory of God, verse (1736)
- Help me, O Lord, full (1726)
- How long wilt thou forget me, verse (1736 or earlier)
- How long wilt thou forget me, verse, incomplete (ca. 1740)
- I cried unto the Lord, verse (1736 or earlier)
- If we believe, verse (ca, 1745)
- I have set God always before me, verse (1749 or earlier)
- I have surely built thee a house, verse (1759) for reopening of St Margaret's, Westminster, 1759
- I was glad, full (1761) for the coronation of George III, 1761
- I will always give thanks, verse (1736 or earlier)
- I will magnify thee, O God, verse (1749 or earlier) ed. by J. Page, in Harmonia sacra, London, 1800
- The King shall rejoice, verse, with orchestra (1761) for the marriage of George III, 1761; ed. in Recent Researches in the Music of the Baroque Era, viii, 1970
- The King shall rejoice, full, with orchestra (1761) for the coronation of George III, 1761
- The King shall rejoice, verse, with orchestra (1766) for the Festival of the Sons of the Clergy, 1766
- Let my complaint come before thee, verse (1736 or earlier) ed. by J. Page, in Harmonia sacra, London, 1800
- Let my prayer come up, full (1761) for, coronation of George III, 1761
- Like as the hart, verse (ca. 1740)
- The Lord is a sun and a shield, full, with orchestra (1761) for the coronation of George III, 1761
- The Lord is full of compassion, verse (1736 or earlier)
- The Lord is King and hath put on glorious apparel, verse (1736 or earlier)
- The Lord is King be the people never so impatient, verse (1763) for thanksgiving for the Peace of Paris, 1763
- The Lord is my light and my salvation, verse (1749 or earlier)
- The Lord liveth, verse (1769 or earlier)
- Lord, teach us to number our days, verse (ca. 1750)
- Lord, thou hast been our refuge, verse, with orchestra (1755; pub. London, 1802) for Festival of the Sons of the Clergy, 1755
- Lord, what is man that thou art mindful of him, verse (ca. 1740)
- Lord, what is man that thou shouldest visit him, verse (ca. 1770)
- Lord, who shall dwell in thy tabernacle, verse (1749 or earlier)
- My heart is fixed, verse (1749 or earlier, lost) text published in A Collection of Anthems used in His Majesty's Chapel Royal, London, 1769
- My heart is inditing, verse, with orchestra (1761) for the coronation of George III, 1761
- My heart rejoiceth in the Lord, verse (1769 or earlier, lost) text published in A Collection of Anthems used in His Majesty's Chapel Royal, London, 1769
- O be joyful in God all ye lands, verse (ca. 1735)
- O be joyful in God all ye lands, verse (1736 or earlier)
- O be jovful in God all ye lands, verse, with orchestra (1749; pub. London, 1752)
- O give thanks unto the Lord and call upon His name, verse (1736 or earlier)
- O give thanks unto the Lord, for he is gracious, verse (1762) for the birth of Prince George, 1762
- O praise the Lord, verse (ca. 1763)
- O sing unto the Lord a new song, verse (ca. 1740)
- O sing unto the Lord a new song, verse (1749 or earlier, lost) text published in A Collection of Anthems used in His Majesty's Chapel Royal, London, 1769
- O where shall wisdom be found?, verse (1769 or earlier)
- Ponder my words, verse (1745 or earlier)
- Praise the Lord, O Jerusalem, full, with orchestra (1761) for the coronation of George III, 1761
- Praise the Lord, ye servants, verse (1749 or earlier)
- Save me, O God, full (ca. 1735)
- Sing, O heavens, verse (ca. 1763)
- Sing praises unto the Lord, verse (1736 or earlier)
- Sing unto the Lord (????)
- The souls of the righteous, full, with orchestra (1760) for the funeral of George II, 1760 [Ov. pub. in Musica Britannica, vol. 13, 1957; complete ed. in Recent Researches in the Music of the Baroque Era, vii, 1970]
- Teach me, O Lord, the way of thy statutes, verse (1736 or earlier)
- Turn thee unto me, full (1736 or earlier)
- Turn thee unto me, verse (1749 or earlier)
- Unto thee, O Lord, verse (1749 or earlier, lost) text published in A Collection of Anthems used in His Majesty's Chapel Royal, London, 1769
- Wherewithal shall a young man cleanse his way, verse (1749 or earlier)

==== Chants and hymns ====
- Double Psalm Chant, D major (????)
- Double Psalm Chant, F major (????)
- Chant, D major, Divine Harmony (1770) doubtful, attributed to Mr. Davis
- Faint is my head and sick my heart (????)
- Hosanna to the King (????)
- How long O my God shall I plead (????)
- I'll celebrate thy praises, Lord (????)
- Lord, how my bosom foes increase (????)
- The Lord my pasture shall prepare (????)
- The Lord does them support that fall (????)
- The man is blest of God through Christ (????)
- O God who dost for ever live (????)
- Palms of glory, raiment bright (New English Hymnal 230)
- Servant of God, well done (????)
- To the call of pressing need (????)
- Weigh the words of my profession (????)
- When rising from the bed of death (????)
- To Sion's hill I lift my eyes (????)

==== Other sacred works ====
- David's Lamentation over Saul and Jonathan, sacred cantata, solo voices, chorus, orchestra (1736) (text: J. Lockman)
- Lo! On the Thorny bed of care (????)
- Noah: An oratorio (????, lost)
- Vital spark of heavenly repair (????)
- Hither, ye sons of harmony repair ('Monumental inscription to the memory of Mr. Gostling, late minor canon of the Cathedral of Canterbury'), 4 voices and basso continuo (ca. 1777) (text: J. Hawkins)
- O how perverse is flesh and blood, partsong (ca. 1725)
- also 12 hymns published in 18th-century anthologies

==== Theatre works ====
- Peleus and Thetis, masque (by 1740) (text: G. Granville, Lord Lansdowne) [Overture pub. in Musica Britannica, vol. 13, 1957]
- Secular Masque (1745; fp. 1750) (text: J. Dryden) [Ov. pub. as Overture No. 6 in 12 Overtures, 1770]
- The Chaplet, musical entertainment in 2 parts (fp. 1749) (text: M. Mendez) [Overture pub. as Symphony No. 3 in 8 Symphonys, 1760]
- The Shepherd's Lottery, musical entertainment in 2 parts (fp. 1751) (text: M. Mendez) [Overture pub. as Symphony No. 4 in 8 Symphonys, 1760]
- The Tempest, masque (fp. 1757) (text: D. Garrick, after Shakespeare)
- Harlequin's Invasion, or A Christmas Gambol, pantomime (fp. 1759) (text: Garrick) a collaboration with M. Arne and T. Aylward
  - Heart of Oak [The official march of the Royal Navy; originally written as part of Harlequin's Invasion]

==== Music in other theatre works ====
- Dirge (in Cymbeline, tragedy; Shakespeare) (1746)
- 2 Songs (in Lethe, or Aesop in the Shades, farce; D. Garrick) (1749)
- Instrumental music (in The Roman Father, tragedy; W. Whitehead) (1750, lost)
- Pastoral interlude (in The Rehearsal, or Bays in Petticoats, comedy; Clive (1750)
- Dirge (in Romeo and Juliet, tragedy; Garrick, after Shakespeare) (1750)
- Song (in The Conscious Lovers, comedy; R. Steele) (ca. 1752)
- Song (in The Gamester, tragedy; E. Moore) (Feb 1753)
- Instrumental music (in Boadicea, tragedy; R. Glover) (1753, lost)
- Music for animating the statue, 3-pt song (in Florizel and Perdita, or The Winter's Tale, comedy; Garrick, after Shakespeare) (1756)
- 2 Songs, duet (in Amphitryon, comedy; J. Hawkesworth, after J. Dryden) (1756)
- 2 Odes (in Agis, tragedy; J. Home) (1758)
- Other songs by Boyce adapted in: The Temple of Peace (1749); Midas (1762); Love in the Village (1762); The Royal Chase (ca. 1765); The Summer's Tale (1765); The Disappointment, or The Force of Credulity (1767); Tom Jones (1769); Harlequin's Museum, or Mother Shipton Triumphant (1792)

=== Court odes ===
- Pierian sisters hail the morn, ode for the King's Birthday, 1755 [Overture pub. in Musica Britannica, vol. 13, 1957]
- Hail! hail! auspicious day, ode for New Year's Day, 1756 [Overture pub. as Symphony No. 1 in 8 Symphonys, 1760]
- When Caesar's natal day, ode for the King's Birthday, 1756 [Overture pub. as Symphony No. 2 in 8 Symphonys, 1760]
- While Britain, in her monarch blest, ode for New Year's Day, 1757
- Rejoice, ye Britons, hail the day!, ode for the King's Birthday, 1757
- Behold, the circle forms! prepare!, ode for New Year's Day, 1758 [Overture pub. in Musica Britannica, vol. 13, 1957]
- When Othbert left the Italian plain, ode for the King's Birthday, 1758 [Ov. pub. as Overture No. 7 in 12 Overtures, 1770, with music from 1765 New Year's ode; also in Musica Britannica, vol. 13, 1957]
- Ye guardian powers, to whose command, ode for New Year's Day, 1759 [1st 2 movements of overture the same as those of Behold, the circle forms, 1758]
- Begin the song – ye subject choirs, ode for the King's Birthday, 1759
- Again the sun's revolving sphere, ode for New Year's Day, 1760 [Overture pub. in Musica Britannica, vol. 13, 1957]
- Still must the muse, indignant hear, ode for New Year's Day, 1761
- 'Twas at the nectar'd feast of Jove, ode for the King's Birthday, 1761 [Ov. pub. as Overture No. 8 in 12 Overtures, 1770]
- God of slaughter, quit the scene, ode for New Year's Day, 1762 [Ov. pub. as Overture No. 5 in 12 Overtures, 1770]
- Go, Flora, said the impatient queen, ode for the King's Birthday, 1762 [Ov. pub. as Overture No. 1 in 12 Overtures, 1770]
- At length the imperious lord of war, ode for New Year's Day, 1763 [Ov. pub. as Overture No. 3 in 12 Overtures, 1770]
- Common births, like common things, ode for the King's Birthday, 1763
- To wedded love the song shall flow, ode for the King's Birthday, 1764 [Ov. pub. as Overture No. 10 in 12 Overtures, 1770]
- Sacred to thee, O commerce, ode for New Year's Day, 1765 [Ov. pub. as Overture No. 7 in 12 Overtures, 1770, with music from 1758 Birthday ode]
- Hail to the rosy morn, ode for the King's Birthday, 1765 [Ov. pub. as Overture No. 2 in 12 Overtures, 1770]
- Hail to the man, so sings the Hebrew bard, ode for the King's Birthday, 1766 [Ov. pub. as Overture No. 11 in 12 Overtures, 1770]
- When first the rude o’erpeopled north, ode for New Year's Day, 1767 [Ov. pub. as Overture No. 12 in 12 Overtures, 1770]
- Friend to the poor! for sure, O king, ode for the King's Birthday, 1767
- Let the voice of music breathe, ode for New Year's Day, 1768 [Ov. pub. as Overture No. 9 in 12 Overtures, 1770]
- Prepare, prepare your songs of praise, ode for the King's Birthday, 1768 [Overture pub. in Musica Britannica, vol. 13, 1957]
- Patron of arts! at length by thee, ode for the King's Birthday, 1769 [Overture pub. in Musica Britannica, vol. 13, 1957]
- Forward, Janus, turn thine eyes, ode for New Year's Day, 1770 [Overture pub. in Musica Britannica, vol. 13, 1957]
- Discord, hence! the torch resign, ode for the King's Birthday, 1770 [Overture pub. in Musica Britannica, vol. 13, 1957]
- Again returns the circling year, ode for New Year's Day, 1771 [Overture pub. in Musica Britannica, vol. 13, 1957]
- Long did the churlish East detain, ode for the King's Birthday, 1771 [Overture pub. in Musica Britannica, vol. 13, 1957]
- At length the fleeting year is o’er, ode for New Year's Day, 1772 [Overture pub. in Musica Britannica, vol. 13, 1957]
- From scenes of death, and deep distress, ode for the King's Birthday, 1772 [Overture pub. in Musica Britannica, vol. 13, 1957]
- Wrapt in stole of sable train, ode for New Year's Day, 1773
- Born for millions are the kings, ode for the King's Birthday, 1773
- Pass but a few short fleeting years, ode for New Year's Day, 1774
- Hark! or does the muse's ear, ode for the King's Birthday, 1774
- Ye powers, who rule o’er states and kings, ode for the King's Birthday, 1775 [Overture pub. in Musica Britannica, vol. 13, 1957]
- On the white rocks which guard her coast, ode for New Year's Day, 1776
- Ye western gales, whose genial breath, ode for the King's Birthday, 1776
- Again imperial winter's sway, ode for New Year's Day, 1777 [Overture pub. in Musica Britannica, vol. 13, 1957]
- Driven out from heaven's ethereal domes, ode for the King's Birthday, 1777
- When rival nations great in arms, ode for New Year's Day, 1778
- Arm’d with her native force, behold, ode for the King's Birthday, 1778
- To arms, to arms ye sons of might, ode for New Year's Day, 1779 [overture same as Pierian sisters, 1755; pub. in Musica Britannica, vol. 13, 1957]

=== Other odes ===
- The charms of harmony display, ode for St Cecilia's Day, ca. 1738 (text: P. Vidal) [Overture pub. in Musica Britannica, vol. 13, 1957]
- See fam’d Apollo and the Nine, ode for St Cecilia's Day, 1739 (text: J. Lockman) [Overture pub. as Symphony No. 5 in 8 Symphonys, 1760; also pub. in Musica Britannica, vol. 13, 1957]
- Gentle lyre, begin the strain (1740) (text: The Pythian Ode; W. Hart, after Pindar) [Overture pub. as Symphony No. 7 in 8 Symphonys, 1760]
- Here all thy active fires diffuse, ode for the installation of Duke of Newcastle as Chancellor of University of Cambridge (1749) (text: W. Mason)
- Strike, strike the lyre, ode for the birthday of Frederick, Prince of Wales, 1750?
- Who but remembers yesterday (Britain's Isle), ode on the death of Frederick, Prince of Wales, 1751
- Let grief subside, ode for the birthday of George, Prince of Wales, 1751
- Another passing year is flown, ode for the birthday of George, Prince of Wales, 1752 (text: W. Harvard)
- Titles and ermine fall behind, ode in commemoration of Shakespeare, Drury Lane, 1756 (text: Havard)
- Cetra de canti amica, ode (1757) in Del canzoniere d'Orazio di Giovan Gualberto Bottarelli (1757)
- Degli amor la madre altera, ode (1757) in Del canzoniere d'Orazio di Giovan Gualberto Bottarelli (1757)
- Arise, immortal Shakespeare rise (1759?) (text: D. Garrick)
- See, white-robed peace, ode for the Seven Years' War, 1763 (text: D. Mallet)
- Lo, on the thorny bed of care (Ode to Charity), soli, chorus and orch, sacred ode for Leicester Infirmary, 1774 (text: J. Cradock)
- Vital spark of heavenly flame (The Dying Christian to his Soul), sacred ode (????) (text: A. Pope)
- In elder time, ode (????, lost)

=== Cantatas, serenades and dialogues ===
- Ah whither, whither would Achilles flee (Deidamia's parting with Achilles upon the siege of Troy), voice and orchestra (ca. 1735)
- Through flowery meads, cantata, 2 voices and orchestra (ca. 1735)
- Gentle zephyrs smoothly rove, serenade, voice and orchestra (ca. 1735)
- When the celestial beauties strove, cantata, 2 voices (ca. 1735)
- Young Damon, fired with amorous heat, cantata, 2 voices (ca. 1735)
- Solomon, serenata, 2 voices, chorus and orchestra (1743) (text: E. Moore) [Ov. pub. as Sym No. 6 in 8 Symphonys, 1760] complete ed. in Musica Britannica, vol. 68
- Long with undistinguished flame, cantata (????) (text: C. Smart) in Lyra britannica, vol. 1, London, 1747
- Tell me ye brooks, cantata (????) (text: W. Congreve) in Lyra britannica, ii, London, 1747
- Blest in Maria's friendship, cantata (????) in Lyra britannica, iii, London, 1748
- Let rakes for pleasure range the town (Johnny and Jenny), dialogue, 2 voices (1748) (text: Moore)
- Did you not once, Lucinda vow, dialogue, 2 voices and orchestra (ca. 1750)
- Thus on a bed of dew bespangled flowers (Thyrsis), cantata (ca. 1750)
- By Danae's progeny (Danae), cantata, voice and orchestra (ca. 1750)
- Blate Jonny (A Scots Cantata) (ca. 1756) (text: A. Ramsay) in Lyra britannica, v, London, 1756
- Haste, haste every nymph, dialogue, voice and orchestra (ca. 1759) in Lyra britannica, vi, London, 1759
- Thou rising sun (The Lapland Cantata) (ca. 1759) (text: A. Philips) in Lyra britannica, vi, London, 1759
- The inconstant swain (????, lost)

=== Glees, catches and rounds ===
- A blooming youth
- Genius of harmony
- Glory be to God on high
- Hallelujah
- Here's to thee Dick
- John Cooper
- Long live King George
- 'Mongst other roses
- ’Tis on earth
- ’Tis thus, thus and thus farewell

=== Solo songs ===
- Again to the garden
- Age in LB, vol. 1, London, 1747
- Ah Chloe! thou treasure
- Ah whither, whither would Achilles flee
- Alas how slowly minutes roll
- Amaz'd, their unfrequented fanes in LB, vol. 2, London, 1747
- As Damon stood in pensive mood in LB, vol. 2, London, 1747
- As Phillis the gay
- As Thyrsis reclined
- At Ross how alter’d is the scene!
- Beneath my feet when Flora cast (????, lost)
- Bid me when forty winters more
- Boast not mistaken swain
- Can nothing, nothing move her
- Castalio’s Complaint (set to musick by Mr. Boyce) in Calliope, 1739
- Cease vainglorious swain
- Come all ye young lovers
- Come all ye youths
- The Distracted Lover in Calliope, 1739
- Each hour Mariana
- Fair Eliza beauteous creature
- The flame of love
- Flora, goddess sweetly blooming
- Go, virgin kid
- Goddess of ease
- The heavenly hours are almost past
- How blest has my time been, first version
- How blest has my time been, second version
- How hard is the fortune of all womankind, 2 voices and b.c. in LB, vol. 1, London, 1747
- How wretched is a maiden’s fate
- I looked, and I sighed
- I love, I doat, first version
- I love, I doat, second version
- If you my wand’ring heart would find
- In vain Philander
- In vain would honour love undo!
- Jessy, or The happy pair in LB, vol. 2, London, 1747
- Long detained by winds contrary
- Lost to the joys of life is he in LB, vol. 2, London, 1747
- Love bids me go
- Love’s no irregular desire
- The man that says Dick Leveridge stinks
- The Modest Petition (words by T. Phillips) in Calliope, 1739
- My Florio
- Near Thames’ green banks
- Near to the silent shady grove
- No more shall meads
- The nymph that I loved
- O nightingale
- Of all the torments, all the cares (The rival or desponding lover) in Calliope, 1739
- Of roses, while I wove
- Oft’ am I by the women told
- On a bank beside a willow
- On thy banks, gentle Stour, song in LB, vol. 1, London, 1747
- One summer's morning
- Parent of blooming flowers (lost)
- Rail no more ye learned asses
- The ravish'd lover (When Fanny blooming fair), song (text: T. Phillips)
- Saw you Phoebe pass this way
- She's blest with wit
- The silent lover in LB, vol. 1, London, 1747
- Silvia the fair (Fair Silvia) in Calliope, 1739
- Since I with Chloe last was seen
- Since nature mankind for society fram’d, part song in LB, vol. 2, London, 1747
- The song of Diana (With horns and with hounds), voice and b.c. (from Dryden's Secular Masque) in LB, vol. 1, London, 1747
- The song of Momus to Mars (The sword within the scabbard keep), voice and b.c. (from Dryden's Secular Masque) in LB, vol. 1, London, 1747'
- The song of Venus in LB, vol. 1, London, 1747
- Song sent with a lady's kid glove in LB, vol. 2, London, 1747
- The sun now darts fainter his rays
- Tell me lovely loving pair
- Tell me no more I am deceiv’d, song in LB, vol. 1, London, 1747
- Tell me, ye brooks, where can my darling hide? in LB, vol. 2, London, 1747
- Tho’ Chloe's out of fashion
- To Harriote all accomplished fair
- To make the wife kind, and to keep the house still (The Happy Happy He), song (1748) (text: Moore)
- To sooth my heart
- ’Twas summer time
- Venus to sooth my heart
- Well-judging Phyllis in LB, vol. 1, London, 1747
- What though you cannot move her
- When Chloe frowning bids me go
- When Fanny/Cloe, blooming fair
- When first on her my eyes were thrown
- When I but dream of her
- When mariners long wind-bound
- When Orpheus went down
- When the nymphs were contending
- When young and artless as the lamb
- While on my Colin's knee I sit
- Who but remembers yesterday
- Why treat me still with cold disdain?
- Would we attain the happiest state
- You say you love
- Young Phillis, one morning

LB – Lyra Britannica: Being a Collection of Songs, Duets, and Cantatas, on Various Subjects 3 volumes (J. Walsh, 1747)

Calliope – Calliope, or English Harmony. A Collection, 1739

=== Orchestra ===
- 8 Symphonies in 8 Parts, op. 2 (pub. London, 1760) overtures from other odes and theater works
    - Symphony No. 1, B♭ major, 2 oboes, strings & b.c. [Overture to ode for the New Year, 1756]
    - Symphony No. 2, A major, 2 oboes, strings & b.c. [Overture to ode for the King's Birthday, 1756]
    - Symphony No. 3, C major, 2 oboes, strings & b.c. [Overture to The Chaplet, pastoral opera, 1749]
    - Symphony No. 4, F major, 2 oboes, 2 horns, 2 bassoons, strings & b.c. [Overture to Shepherd’s Lottery, pastoral opera, 1751]
    - Symphony No. 5, D major, 2 oboes, 2 trumpets, timpani, strings & b.c. [Overture to ode for St. Cecilia's Day, 1739]
    - Symphony No. 6, F major, 2 oboes, strings & b.c. [Overture to Solomon, serenata, 1742]
    - Symphony No. 7, B♭ major, 2 oboes, strings & b.c. [Overture to the Pythian Ode, 1740–41]
    - Symphony No. 8, D minor, 2 oboes, strings & b.c. [Worcester Overture]
- 12 Overtures in 7, 9, 10 and 12 Parts (pub. London, 1770) overtures from other odes and theater works
    - No. 1, D major, 2 oboes, strings & b.c. [Overture to ode for the King's Birthday, 1762]
    - No. 2, G major, 2 flutes, 2 oboes, bassoon, strings & b.c. [Overture to ode for the King's Birthday, 1765]
    - No. 3, B♭ major, 2 oboes, 2 bassoons (opt.), strings & b.c. [Overture to ode for New Year's Day, 1763]
    - No. 4, D major, 2 oboes, bassoon, 2 horns, 2 trumpets, timpani, strings & b.c.
    - No. 5, F major, 2 oboes, strings & b.c. [Overture to ode for New Year's Day, 1762, with new 2nd mvt]
    - No. 6, D minor, 2 flutes, 2 oboes, 2 horns, strings & b.c. [Overture to Secular Masque, 1745]
    - No. 7, G major, 2 oboes, strings & b.c. [taken from both ode for the King’s Birthday, 1758, and ode for New Year’s Day, 1765]
    - No. 8, D major, 2 flutes, 2 oboes, 2 horns, 2 trumpets, timpani, strings & b.c. [Overture to ode for the King’s Birthday, 1761]
    - No. 9, A major, 2 oboes, strings & b.c. [Overture to ode for New Year’s Day, 1768]
    - No. 10, F major, 2 oboes, bassoon, 2 horns, strings & b.c. [Overture to ode for the King’s Birthday, 1764]
    - No. 11, D major, 2 oboes, 2 trumpets, timpani, strings & b.c. [Overture to ode for the King’s Birthday, 1766]
    - No. 12, G major, 2 oboes, bassoon, 2 horns, strings & b.c. [Overture to ode for New Year’s Day, 1767]
- Concerto, D minor (The Worcester Overture) (????) [pub. as Symphony No. 8 in 8 Symphonies, 1760]
- Concerto grosso, B minor (????)
- 3 Concerti grossi, B♭ major, D minor (incomplete), E minor (????)
- Concerto, bassoon (1742, lost) performed at Castle Tavern, London, 11 August 1742

=== Instrumental ===
- 3 Sonatas, 2 violins and basso continuo (ca. 1740)
- Overture, C major (ca. 1740) keyboard score only
- 12 Sonatas, 2 violins, cello, harpsichord (pub. London, 1747)
- 10 voluntaries, organ/harpsichord (pub. London, 1779)

=== Recordings ===
- "BOYCE: Symphonies Nos. 1-8, Op. 2" Aradia Ensemble conducted by Kevin Mallon (2005 Naxos CD 8.557278)
- "Boyce: Overtures 1-9" Cantilena conducted by Adrian Shepherd (1981 Chandos CDR)
