= List of people from Sevenoaks =

Sevenoaks is a town in Kent, England. The following is a list of pages of people who were born, live or have lived in the town, or made some important contribution to it. Please add only notable people with a Wikipedia page.

== Notable people from Sevenoaks ==
Table of contents:

A B C D E F G H I J K L M N O P Q R S T U V W X Y Z

== A ==
- John Miller Adye (1819–1900) Army officer
- Jeffrey Amherst, 1st Baron Amherst (1717–97) colonial governor of Massachusetts
- William Amherst (c. 1732–1781) Army officer
- William Amherst, 3rd Earl Amherst (1836–1910) Member of Parliament, Freemason
- Geoffrey Anson (1922–77) cricketer
- Charles Robert Ashbee (1863–1942) member of Arts & Crafts Movement

== B ==
- Cheryl Baker (born 1954) singer in Bucks Fizz and TV presenter
- Reg Balch (1894–1994) Canadian photographer and scientist
- Anton du Beke (born 1966) ballroom dancer
- Douglas Booth (born 1992) actor
- Thomas Bourchier (c. 1404–1486) Archbishop of Canterbury, Lord Chancellor
- Tom Bosworth (born 1990) Olympic race walker
- David Bowie (born 1947) Rock n roll musician, performer, artist.
- William Bowra (1752–1820) cricketer
- Matthew Branton (born 1968) novelist
- Bill Bruford (born 1949) drummer for bands such as Yes and King Crimsons

== C ==
- Hugh Cecil (born 1889) photographer
- Mike Conway (born 1983) 2006 British Formula Three and 2019–20 FIA World Endurance Championship champion
- Simon Cope (born 1966) cyclist

== D ==
- Anne Seymour Damer (1748–1828) sculptor
- W. H. Davies (1871–1940) poet and tramp
- Daniel Day-Lewis (born 1957) actor, attended Sevenoaks School in his early teens
- Christopher Don (Donny) (born 1984) disc jockey, drum and bass artist
- John Donne (1572–1631) metaphysical poet and Dean of Old St Paul's Cathedral
- Diana, Princess of Wales (1961–1997) attended West Heath School in Sevenoaks.

== E ==
- Joan Adeney Easdale (1913–1989) poet, was born in Sevenoaks.
- John Epps (1805–69) homeopathic physician; religious dissenter

== F ==
- John Farey (1791–1851) mechanical engineer
- John Frith (1503–1533) priest and writer

== G ==
- Philip Game (1876–1961) Metropolitan Police Commissioner; Governor of New South Wales
- Walter Gilliat (1869–1963) priest, Association football player
- Cathy Gilliat-Smith (born 1981) England and Great Britain field hockey player
- Paul Greengrass (born 1955) film director and screenwriter
- George Grote (1794–1871) historian

== H ==
- Henry Moore (born 2008) Golden boot winner (2023)
- Paul Hartnoll (born 1968) musician (Orbital)
- Brian Hord (born 1934) politician
- George Henry Horton (born 1993) filmmaker
- Claude Houghton (born 1889) author
- John Humphrys (born 1943) radio broadcaster
- Gloria Hunniford (born 1940) radio and television personality
- John Hurt (born 1940) actor

== K ==
- Janet Kear (1933–2004) ornithologist
- Caron Keating (1962–2004) TV presenter
- Sam King (1911–2003) golfer
- John Kirk (1832–1922) Scottish physician, naturalist, companion to explorer David Livingstone, British Consul in Zanzibar
- John Buxton Knight (1843–1908) landscape painter
- Dick Knowles (1917–2008) MP

== L ==
- Justine Lord (born 1938) actress

== M ==
- Joseph Miller (died 1794) cricketer
- John Minshull (c. 1741–1793) cricketer
- Sarah Morris (born 1967) British-born American artist and filmmaker based in New York
- Netta Muskett (1887–1963) novelist

== P ==
- Lance Percival (born 1933) actor, comedian and singer
- Edward Plunkett, 18th Baron of Dunsany (1878–1957) President of Sevenoaks Boy Scouts Association and Sevenoaks Chess Club

== R ==
- Val Romney (c. 1718–1773) cricketer

== S ==
- Lionel Sackville-West, 2nd Baron Sackville (1827–1908) diplomat
- Lionel Sackville-West, 6th Baron Sackville (1913–2004) stockbroker
- Vita Sackville-West (1892–1962) author, member of the Bloomsbury group
- John Salako (born 1969) association footballer
- James Sharman (living) TV producer and sportscaster; host of The Footy Show on The Score
- Peter Sissons (1942 - 2019) newsreader
- Philip Stanhope, 1st Baron Weardale (1847–1923) politician and philanthropist
- Tilda Swinton (born 1960) actress, attended West Heath School, Sevenoaks
- Plum Sykes (born 1969) fashion writer and novelist

== T ==
- Andy Titterrell (born 1981) England rugby union international
- Edward Thomas (1878–1917) poet and journalist
- Arthur Herbert Thompson (1890–1916) amateur footballer and soldier

== W ==
- Tom Warren (born 1983) rugby union player
- H. G. Wells (1866–1946) novelist and science fiction writer
- James Whitbourn (born 1963) composer
- Charlie Whiting (1952–2019) Formula One race director
- Joe Wilkinson (born 1975) comedian

== Y ==
- Lizzy Yarnold (born 1988) Skeleton racer, most successful British Winter Olympian of all time

== Z ==
- Robert Charles Zaehner (1913–1974) British academic whose field of study was Eastern religions.
