= Adkins–Peterson reaction =

Chemical reaction

The Adkins–Peterson reaction is the air oxidation of methanol to formaldehyde with metal oxide catalysts such as iron oxide, molybdenum trioxide or combinations thereof.

Whilst this class of oxidation had been investigated previously, in-depth systemization of the behaviour of the iron oxide/molybdenum trioxide catalyst was carried out by Homer Burton Adkins and Wesley R. Peterson.

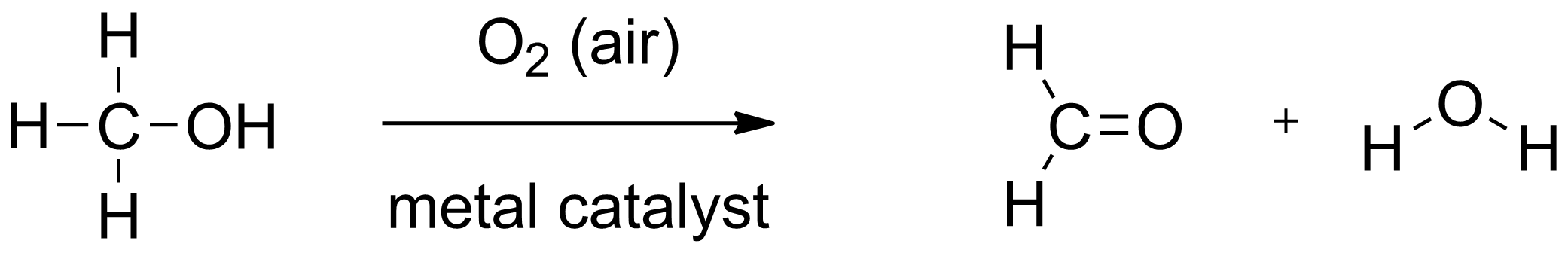

== Reaction Conditions ==
- The reaction is typically conducted at 300°C to 400°C.
- Equimolar proportions of iron and molybdenum oxides yields the highest conversion of methanol to formaldehyde, achieving over 90% conversion with carbon monoxide as the secondary product.
