= Spiderwood Studios =

Coordinates: 30.194742°N 97.429560°W

Spiderwood Studios, LLC (100% owner, Tommy G Warren)
- Type: Movie studio
- Industry: Film
- Founded: 2009
- Founder: Tommy G. Warren
- Headquarters: Austin, Texas Where new Austin offices for "SPIDERWOOD MAGIC" are being renovated / built in Austin, near the State of Texas Capital. Producer / Writer Tommy G Warren said Spiderwood Magic and Spiderwood Media is under development and plans are being made to Produce Animation, Comic Books, Visual Effects, Visual Reality, and Music related "Storyworlds" where Creative Imagination comes to Life!, Austin, USA
- Number of locations: The Film / TV / Media Studios are located, 140 Utley Road, Utley, Texas 78621
- Key people: Tommy G. Warren 281.744.7142
- Services: Motion Picture, Music and Animation Studios
- Owner: Tommy G. Warren
- Subsidiaries: Spiderwood Productions; Spiderwood Animations & Spiderwood Magic...
- Website: Official web site

Spiderwood Studios is a motion picture, television, music and animation studio in the United States that opened in 2009 by producer Tommy G. Warren. Located east of downtown Austin, Texas, it is situated on 164 acres of back lot alongside the Colorado River, and is the state's largest privately owned studio.

== Studio facilities ==
Spiderwood Studios facilities includes sound stages as well as fully equipped production offices and suites, make-up rooms, a film vault and a R.V. park with full hook-ups. The facilities are capable of housing various sets that can be redressed. Spiderwood Studios produces feature films, television, animation, music recording as well as national and international commercials.

Spiderwood Studios is home to a 24-foot-high, 100-foot-wide, one-of-a-kind Cyclorama Wall designed by Visual Effects Director Chuck Schuman (Avatar, Lord of the Rings Trilogy) and Tommy G. Warren. The stage is most often used for visual effects and wire stunts, and is equipped with a steel cat walk. It also has the capabilities to create artificial snow or rain, and has visual effect capabilities. In addition, the facilities have a kitchen, dining room, several conference rooms, its own control room, edit bays, ADR/Isolation rooms, and storage.

== Spiderwood Magic, LLC ==
Spiderwood Animation is set to merge with Spiderwood Magic and Spiderwood Media, all of which are currently in development. The combined entities plan to produce films and videos designed to bring imaginative story worlds to life. Flight of Magic, a three-act animated short film, is the first project to be fully produced in Texas and was written, directed, and produced at Spiderwood with an all-Texas cast and crew. A new office facility is also being renovated to support this expanded component of the Spiderwood brand.

== Back lot ==
Spiderwood Studios has the only groomed-for-production back lot in Texas. The back lot offers a historic pioneer cabin that was built in the 1840s, as well as a modern-day cabin constructed with flyaway walls, that is set along the Colorado River frontage. There is also small boat docking available on the creek, behind the cabin. The back lot also offers Spanish moss-covered trees, old and new trees and vegetation, open pastures, rolling hills as well as native wild flowers. Trails of gravel and dirt roads travel along groomed-for-production old and new forests. All kinds of Production shooting with all types of "locations sets", including set locations for Music Videos such as the production and shoot of "Animal" by the band "Disturbed"...

== Awards ==
The Flight of Magic (3D)

- 2012 Indie Fest, Award of Merit for Original Song "Believe"
- 2012 California International Animation Festival, Winner, Audience Favorite
- 2012 Park City Film Music Festival, Finalist for Original Music from the film "Flight of Magic"
- 2012 Newport Beach Film Festival, Official Selection
- 2012 The 33rd Annual Telly Award, Silver Award, Non-Broadcast Productions for Use of Animation
- 2012 The 33rd Annual Telly Award, Bronze Award, Non-Broadcast Productions for Children's Audience
- 2011 The Accolade Competition, Award of Excellence in Animation
- 2011 The Prestige Film Award, Gold Award for Short Film/Video
- 2011 The Prestige Film Award, Gold Award for Holiday Film
- 2011 The Prestige Film Award, Silver Award for Animation
- 2011 The Prestige Film Award, Bronze Award for Original Song "Believe"

Darker Than Night

- 2014 The Accolade Competition, Award of Excellence for Movie Trailer
- 2014 The Accolade Competition, Award of Merit for Special Effects, non-animation/stunts
- 2014 The Accolade Competition, Award of Merit for Lighting
- 2014 IndieFest, Award won for Visiual Effects and Lighting
- 2014 IndieFest, Award of Excellence

== Credits ==
Miscellaneous Company - filmography

- Templar: Honor Among Thieves (2014) ... Studio Sound Stage
- Doonby (2011) ... Musical Recording Studio & Special Effects Company
- "The Lying Game" (2011) School Set
- The Ascent (2010) ... Studio Back-lot
- Wilderness (2010/I) ... Studio Back-lot
- The Overbrook Brothers (2009) ... Studio Back-lot
- Teed Off Too (2006) (V) ... In Association With
- Teed Off (2005) (V) ... In Association With
- Hip Hop Get Down (2003) (V) ... In Association With

Production Company - filmography

- Bad Kids Go to Hell (2012) ... Production Company (in co-production with)
- Blaze Foley: Duct Tape Messiah (2011) ... Production Company (produced in association with)
- It's in the Blood (2012)... Production Company (in association with)
- Flight of Magic (2011) ... Production Company (3-D animation)
- Something's Gonna Live (2010) ... Production Company (produced in association with)
- Teed Off: Behind the Tees (2005) (V) ... Production Company (in association)

Music Videos

- Disturbed- "The Animal" (2010)... Studio Back-lot
- Steve Miller Band- "I Got Love If You Want It" (2011)... Stage B
