= Walter Hartung =

American chemist (1895 – 1961)

Walter Henry Hartung
- Born: January 4, 1895; Welcome, Minnesota
- Died: September 29, 1961 (aged 66); Richmond, Virginia
- Education: University of Minnesota (B.A., 1918); University of Wisconsin–Madison (Ph.D., 1926)
- Scientific career
- Fields: Pharmaceutical chemistry
- Workplaces: Sharp & Dohme; Temple University; University of Maryland School of Pharmacy; UNC Eshelman School of Pharmacy; Medical College of Virginia School of Pharmacy
- Thesis: The constitution of aldehydes in relation to affinity and reactivity in acetal formation (1926)
- Doctoral advisor: Homer Burton Adkins

Walter Henry Hartung (1895 – 1961) was an American pharmaceutical chemist. His work studied the chemical and biological properties of amines.

== Early life and education ==
Hartung was born in Welcome, Minnesota and began his postsecondary education at the University of Minnesota, ultimately graduating with a Bachelor of Arts in 1918 after a tour of duty in the United States Marine Corps during World War I. He went on to receive his PhD in organic chemistry in 1926 from the University of Wisconsin–Madison, where he was advised by Homer Burton Adkins.

== Career and later life ==
After completing his PhD, Hartung taught as a lecturer at Temple University while employed for Sharp & Dohme for 10 years (now Merck & Co.). In 1936, Hartung became the Head of the Department of Pharmaceutical Chemistry at the University of Maryland School of Pharmacy. In 1941, he published a textbook, The Chemistry of Organic Medicinal Products, which was translated into Spanish.

In 1948, Hartung was recruited to be a professor at the UNC Eshelman School of Pharmacy, where he taught courses such as organic and inorganic pharmaceutical chemistry and drug analysis. He left UNC for the Medical College of Virginia School of Pharmacy in 1956. Upon the resignation of Hartung and his colleague John Andrako from the UNC School of Pharmacy, the chancellor stated, "The School of Pharmacy has lost its primary scholar and best teacher."

In 1950, Hartung was elected to the Revision Committee of the United States Pharmacopeia. Hartung was also an editor of the fifth and sixth volumes of the American Chemical Society's Division of Medicinal Chemistry reviews, Medicinal Chemistry. During his 25 years as a professor, he advised over 18 master's students and 48 PhD students.

Hartung died unexpectedly of heart complications in Richmond, Virginia on September 29, 1961, at the age of 66.

== Honors and awards ==
In 1933, Hartung was elected a Fellow of the American Association for the Advancement of Science. In 1947, Hartung was awarded the American Pharmaceutical Association's Ebert Prize. Hartung was also a fellow of the American Institute of Chemists and the New York Academy of Science.

=== Legacy ===
An editorial note in the October 1961 issue of the Journal of Pharmaceutical Sciences described Hartung as "a pioneer in the field of drug chemistry." In 1968, the UNC Eshelman School of Pharmacy posthumously established a lectureship in his name, the Walter H. Hartung Memorial Lecture.

== Personal life ==
With his wife, Corda, he had three children: Homer, Richard, and Victor. His granddaughter is Lin Chambers.
