= William Warren =

William, Will, Willie, or Bill Warren may refer to:

== Arts and entertainment ==
- William Warren (actor, born 1767) (1767–1832), American actor
- William Warren (actor, born 1812) (1812–1888), American actor
- William T. Warren (1877–1962), American architect
- Bill Warren (film historian) (1943–2016), American film historian and critic
- Willie D. Warren (1924–2000), American electric blues guitarist, bass player and singer

== Law and politics ==
- William W. Warren (1834–1880), American representative from Massachusetts
- William John Finley Warren (1873–1963), Canadian politician in Saskatchewan
- William Warren (politician) (1879–1927), Canadian politician in Newfoundland
- William J. Warren (born 1939), Canadian lawyer and university chancellor
- William Warren (journalist) (1833–1900), mayor of Queenstown Borough in New Zealand

== Science and medicine ==
- William "Bill" Warren (physicist) (born 1938), American physicist
- William Warren (entomologist) (1839–1914), English entomologist
- William Henry Warren (1852–1926), English-born engineer in Australia
- William H. Warren, American psychologist

== Sports ==
- Bill Warren (baseball) (1884–1960), American baseball player
- Willie Warren (born 1989), American basketball player
- Will Warren (born 1999), American baseball pitcher

== Others ==
- Sir William Warren (died 1602), Irish landowner, statesman and soldier
- William Whipple Warren (1825–1853), American Ojibwe historian
- William Fairfield Warren (1833–1929), American academic, first president of Boston University
- William C. Warren (1836–1870), American law enforcement officer in Los Angeles
- William K. Warren Sr. (1897–1990), American businessman and philanthropist in Oklahoma
- Bill Warren (communist) (1935–1978), British communist theorist
- Bill Warren (businessman) (1941–2019), American corporate human resource executive

== See also ==
- Warren (name)
- Warren William (1894–1948), American actor
