= Edward Warren =

Edward Warren may refer to:

- Edward A. Warren (1818–1875), U.S. representative from Arkansas
- Edward Prioleau Warren (1856–1937), British architect and archaeologist
- Edward Perry Warren (1860–1928), known as Ned Warren, American art collector and writer
- Edward Kirk Warren (1847–1919), American businessman and inventor; namesake of Warren Dunes State Park
- Edward Warren (politician) (1897–1983), Australian politician
- Edward Warren (MP), member of parliament (MP) for Liverpool
- Edward Warren (priest), Irish Anglican dean
- Edward Royal Warren (1860–1942), American naturalist and engineer
- Edward Henry Warren (1873–1945), American lawyer and professor of law at Harvard Law School
- Edward Jenner Warren (1826–1876), American lawyer, state legislator, and judge in North Carolina
- Edward Tiffin Harrison Warren (1829–1864), Virginia lawyer and military colonel
- Ted Warren (Edward John Warren), Australian politician
- Edward Delon Warren (1953–2003), American serial killer and criminal
- E. Alyn Warren (1874–1940), American actor
- Sir Edward de Warren (died 1349), illegitimate son of John de Warenne, 7th Earl of Surrey
- Ed Warren (Edward Warren Miney, 1926–2006), American paranormal investigator and author
