= Mel Deschenes =

Mel Deschenes was the director-general of the counter-terrorism branch of the Canadian Security Intelligence Service in 1985 at the time of the Air India bombing. James S. Warren is alternatingly referred to as having held the position of director-general at the same time.

In 2007 it was revealed that the week prior to the bombing, Deschenes was in Los Angeles with an International Commission on Terrorism, when he reportedly told Justice Department agent Graham Pinos that he felt Sikh extremists were "likely" to have a Canadian plane "blown out of the air". On June 19, 1985, four days before the Air India bombing, he then reportedly told Ontario Crown attorney Michael Anne MacDonald that he had to return to Canada immediately to deal with "Sikh extremists in Vancouver".

However, when detailing his role in the investigation in 1988, Deschenes had written that he simply returned to Canada because "he was no longer needed" in Los Angeles, and chided others for remaining to "soak up some sun".

After the bombing occurred on Sunday morning, Deschenes wasn't called into work since his colleagues were unaware he had returned.

Due to his age and poor health, it was announced Deschenes would not be called to testify before the Air India Inquiry, though Graham Pinos, a former Federal Prosecutor, testified that Deschenes had told him only days before the bombing that "rogue elements" of the Indian Secret Service were operating in Canada, and likely to bring down a plane.
