= Andy Warren =

Andy Warren may refer to:

- Andy Warren (British musician) (born 1958), English bassist
- Andy Warren (Canadian musician), Canadian independent musician
- Andrew Warren (born c. 1968), author and CIA operative
- Andrew Warren (geographer) (born 1937), British physical geographer
- Andrew Warren (Home and Away), fictional character in the Australian soap opera Home and Away
- Andrew H. Warren, American prosecutor and politician
- Andrew Warren (entrepreneur) (born 1993), American fashion designer
