= James Warren =

James Warren may refer to:

- James Warren (actor) (1913–2001), American film actor and artist
- James Warren (engineer) (1806–1908), British engineer who patented the Warren-type truss bridge in 1848
- James Warren (journalist) (born 1953), Huffington Post blogger, former Chicago Tribune managing editor
- James Warren (judoka) (born 1974), British judoka
- James Warren, member of bands Stackridge and The Korgis
- James Warren (politician) (1726–1808), Provincial Congress of Massachusetts president; general in American Revolution
- James Warren (presidential candidate), Socialist Workers Party candidate for United States President in 1988 and 1992
- James Warren (publisher) (born 1930), magazine publisher and founder of Warren Publishing
- James D. Warren, American newspaper publisher and politician from New York
- James Ronald Warren (1925–2012), Seattle historian
- James S. Warren, former director-general of the counter-terrorism branch of the Canadian Security Intelligence Service
- James Warren (academic) (born 1974), professor of Ancient Philosophy in the Faculty of Classics at the University of Cambridge
- Jamie Warren (born 1961), country music singer-songwriter
- Jimmy Warren (1939–2006), American college and professional football cornerback

== See also ==
- Jim Warren (disambiguation)
- Warren James (1792–1841), English miners' leader
