= Lin Chambers =

American physical scientist

- Education: Rensselaer Polytechnic Institute; North Carolina State University
- Scientific career
- Fields: Aerospace engineering Earth science Science education Citizen science
- Workplaces: NASA Langley Research Center
- Thesis: Nonequilibrium Radiative Heating Prediction Method for Aeroassist Flowfields with Coupling to Flowfield Solvers (1991)
- Doctoral advisor: Fred DeJarnette

Lin Chambers (née Hartung) is an American physical scientist. She has developed and contributed to multiple international programs around science education and citizen science at NASA Langley Research Center.

== Early life and education ==
Chambers is an alumna of East Lansing High School; her grandfather is the chemist Walter Henry Hartung. She obtained bachelor's and master's degrees in aeronautical engineering at Rensselaer Polytechnic Institute in 1985. She began working with the NASA Langley Research Center as an undergraduate student at RPI in 1983 through the NASA co-op program before permanently moving to Hampton, Virginia.

She participated in the International Space University Summer Session in 1989 in Strasbourg, France.

Chambers received her PhD in aerospace engineering at North Carolina State University in 1991. Her dissertation, advised by Fred DeJarnette, was the creation of a model to predict "radiation absorption and emission coefficients in thermochemical nonequilibrium flows."

== Career ==
Per her training, Chambers began at NASA as an aerospace engineer. Her work focused on atmospheric entry of spacecraft.

Starting in the mid-1990s, she adapted her expertise in radiative transfer to atmospheric science. This included working on the Clouds and the Earth's Radiant Energy System (CERES) project to study the effect of clouds on the Earth's energy budget, and the CALIPSO satellite mission to detect clouds and aerosols from space.

In 1997, she founded the Student Cloud Observation Online (S'COOL) project, a citizen science initiative which engages young students in scientific observations of local cloud patterns, collecting that data for validation of measurements by the CERES satellite. As of 2016, the S’COOL project had received more than 144,500 cloud observations from students in 77 countries, including multiple observations from ocean basins taken onboard transoceanic ships. In March 2017, the project was merged with the GLOBE Program.

In 2004, Chambers helped to start the MY NASA DATA project, with the intention of making earth science datasets accessible to K-12 teachers, students, and amateur scientists.

From 2016 to 2018 she served as the interim program manager of the GLOBE Program at NASA Headquarters.

As of 2020, Chambers has authored over 150 publications in aerospace engineering, atmospheric science, and science education.

== Honors and awards ==
- 1999 NASA Exceptional Achievement Medal
- 2009 NASA Exceptional Service Medal
- 2014 North Carolina State University Alumni Hall of Fame
- 2015 American Association for the Advancement of Science Fellow for her contributions to science education
- 2024 American Geophysical Union Excellence in Earth and Space Science Education Award
