= William Boyce (composer) =

English composer and organist (1711-1779)

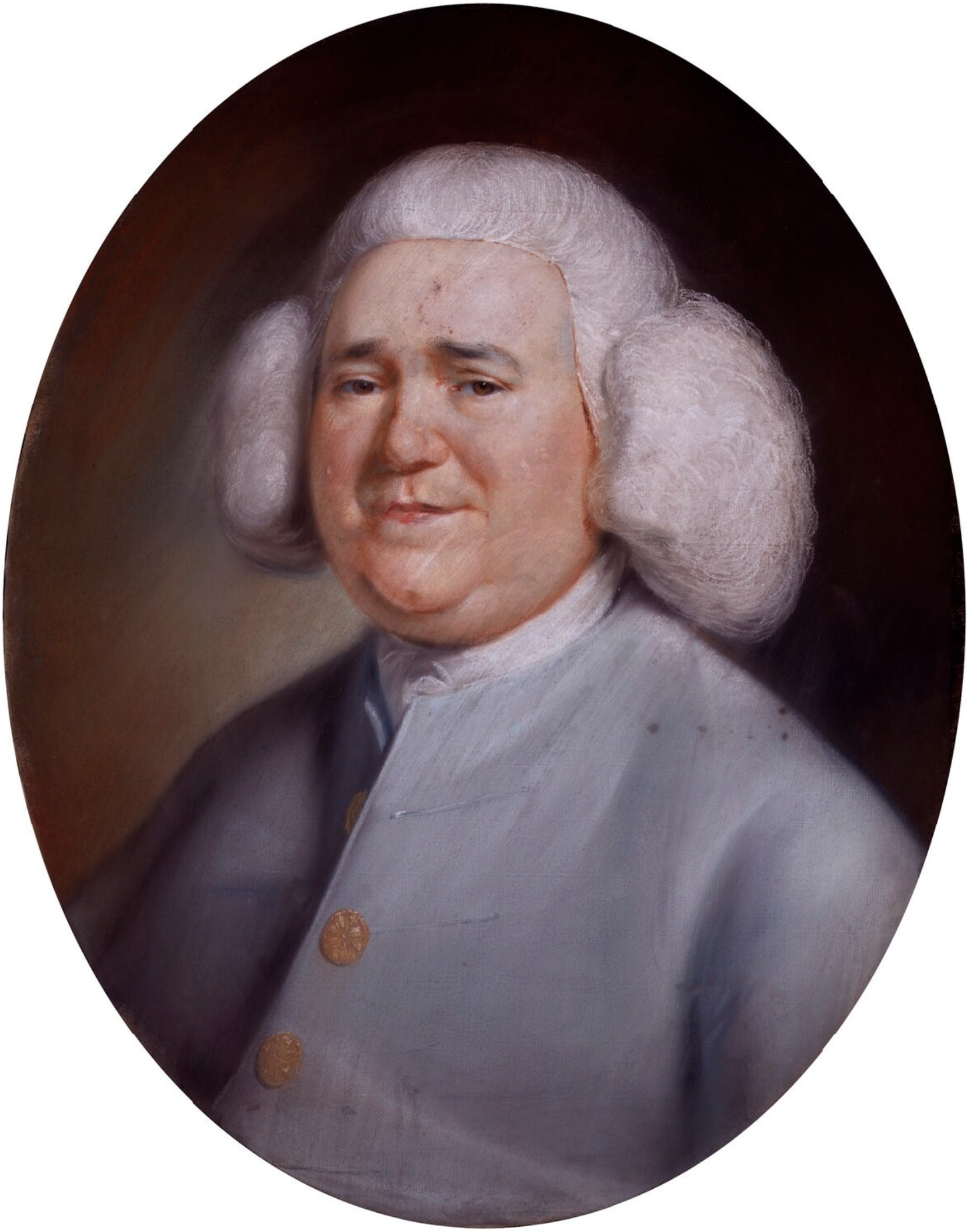
William Boyce by John Russell, 1776

William Boyce (baptised 11 September 1711 – 7 February 1779) was an English composer and organist. Like Beethoven later on, he became deaf but continued to compose. He knew Handel, Arne, Gluck, J. C. Bach, Abel, and a very young Mozart, all of whom respected his work.

== Life ==
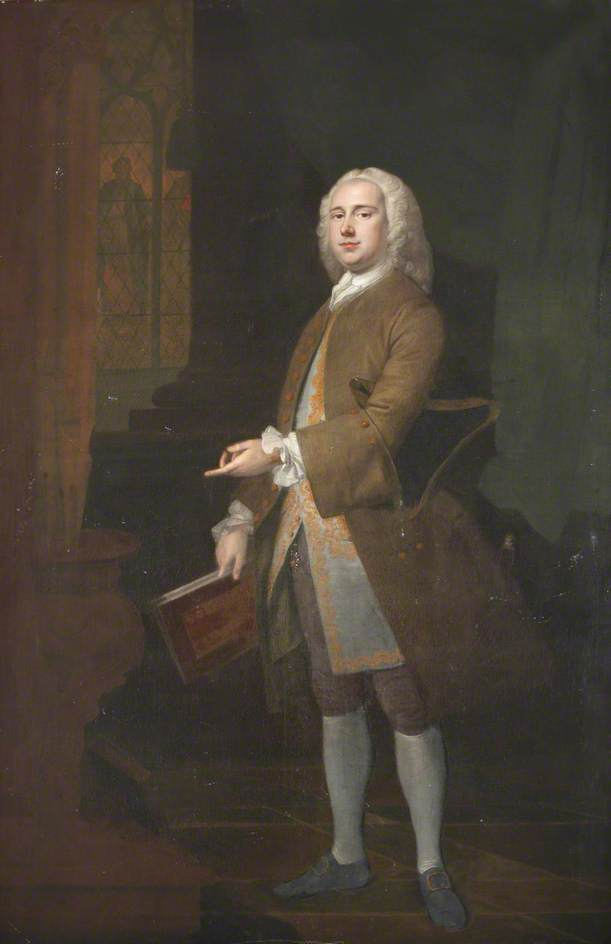
William Boyce by Thomas Hudson, ca. 1745

Boyce was born in London, at Joiners' Hall, then in Lower Thames Street, to John Boyce, at the time a joiner and cabinet-maker, and beadle of the Worshipful Company of Joiners and Ceilers, and his wife Elizabeth Cordwell. He was baptised on 11 September 1711 and was admitted by his father as a choirboy at St Paul's Cathedral in 1719. After his voice broke in 1727, he studied music with Maurice Greene.

His first professional appointment came in 1734 when he was employed as an organist at the Oxford Chapel in central London. He went on to take a number of similar posts before being appointed Master of the King's Musick in 1757 (he had applied for the post on the death of Maurice Greene in 1755) and becoming one of the organists at the Chapel Royal in 1758. He also gave lessons, his daughter telling the composer R. J. S. Stevens that both Thomas Linley the elder and Thomas Linley the younger had been his pupils in counterpoint in the period 1763–1768.

His work as a composer began in the 1730s, writing songs for Vauxhall Gardens. In 1736 he was named as composer to the Chapel Royal and wrote the oratorio David's Lamentation over Saul and Jonathan. He was engaged as conductor to the Three Choirs Festival in 1737; many of his works, including the Worcester Overture (today known as his Symphony no. 8), will have been premiered at the Festival over the succeeding years. The 1740s saw his opera Peleus and Thetis, the serenata Solomon, and his Secular Masque, to a libretto by John Dryden. In 1749 he wrote an ode and the anthem O be joyful to celebrate the installation of the Duke of Newcastle as Chancellor of Cambridge University, and was awarded the degree of Doctor of Music. In 1747 he had published his first purely instrumental composition, a set of "Twelve Sonatas for Two Violins and a Bass" and these proved popular. English music historian Charles Burney wrote that they were "not only in constant use, as Chamber music, in private concerts ... but in our theatres, as act-tunes [i.e. intermezzi] and public gardens, as favourite pieces, during many years."

In the 1750s Boyce supplied David Garrick with songs and other music for many productions at the Drury Lane Theatre. These included his own operas The Chaplet and The Shepherd's Lottery, both to libretti by Moses Mendez, and for Garrick's 1759 pantomime Harlequin's Invasion which contained what became Boyce's most famous song, Heart of Oak.

As Master of the King's Musick Boyce had the responsibility of writing music for royal occasions including funerals, weddings and coronations. He, however, refused to make a new setting of Zadok the Priest for the coronation of George III and Charlotte in 1761 on the grounds that Handel's setting of the anthem was unsurpassable – as a consequence of which Handel's setting has been performed at every subsequent British coronation. However, that coronation is the only one recorded where a single musician wrote nearly all the music, Boyce having composed a total of eight anthems specifically for the event.

By the year 1758, his deafness had increased to such an extent that he was unable to continue in his organist posts. He resolved to give up teaching and to retire to Kensington, and devote himself to editing the collection of church music which bears his name. He retired and worked on completing the compilation Cathedral Music that his teacher Greene had left incomplete at his death. This led to Boyce editing works by the likes of William Byrd and Henry Purcell. Many of the pieces in the collection are still used in Anglican services today.

On 7 February 1779 Boyce died from an attack of gout, aged 67. He was buried under the dome of St Paul's Cathedral. His only son, also William Boyce (25 March 1764 – 1824), was a professional double bass player.

== Legacy ==
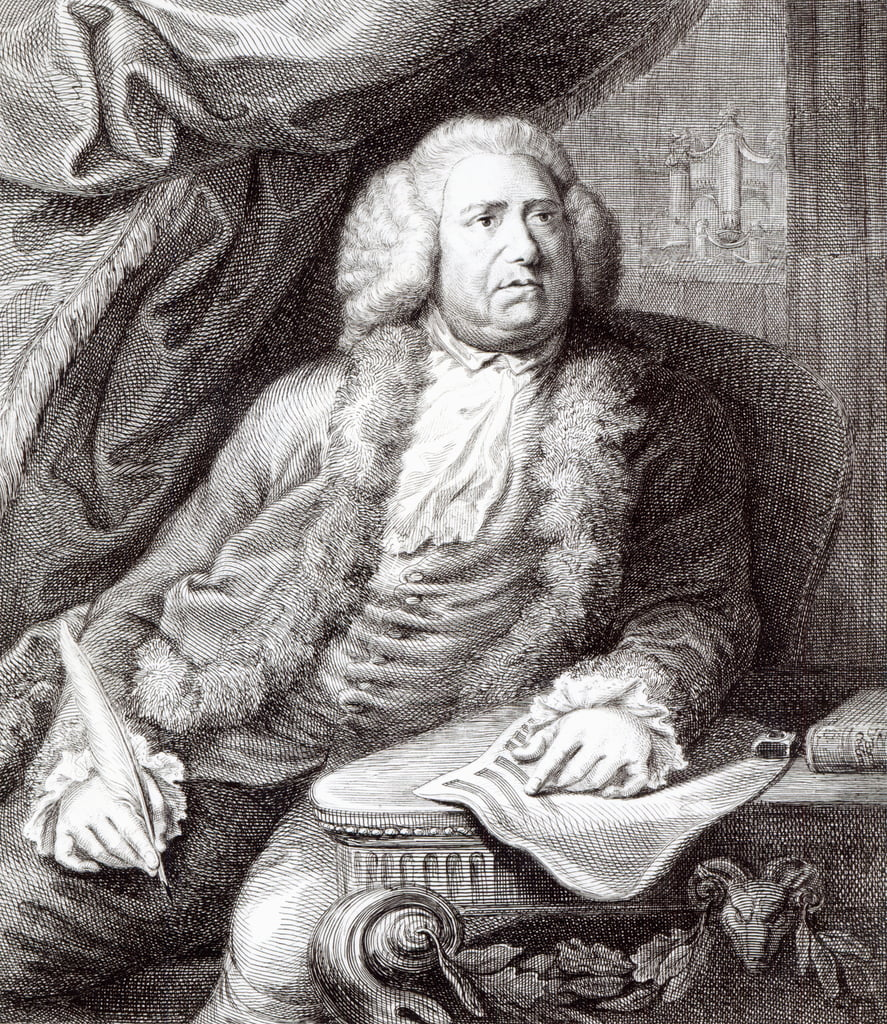
William Boyce, engraved by John Keyse Sherwin

Boyce was largely forgotten after his death and he remains a little-performed composer today, although a number of his pieces were rediscovered in the 1930s, and Constant Lambert edited and sometimes conducted his works. Lambert had already launched the early stages of the modern Boyce revival in 1928, when he published the first modern edition of the Eight Symphonies (Bartlett and Bruce 2001). The great exception to this neglect was his church music, which was edited after his death by Philip Hayes and published in two large volumes, Fifteen Anthems by Dr Boyce in 1780 and A Collection of Anthems and a Short Service in 1790 (Bartlett 2003, 54).

Church choral music saw a revival in the 1830s and 1840s, under the influences of the Tractarians, the Cambridge Camden Society, and the financial changes carried out under the "Dean and Chapter Act" (the Ecclesiastical Commissioners Act 1840). A new edition of Boyce's works as Cathedral Music, edited by Joseph Warren, appeared in 1849.

The first movement (Allegro) of Boyce's Symphony No. 1 in B-flat was the first piece of music played during the procession of the bride and bridegroom at the conclusion of the wedding of Prince Harry and Meghan Markle in 2018. His coronation anthem The King Shall Rejoice, initially composed for the coronation of George III in 1761, was also performed at the coronation of Charles III in 2023.

Boyce's portraits were painted by Joshua Reynolds and Thomas Hudson. He was drawn and engraved by John Keyse Sherwin, and a vignette made by Drayton after Robert Smirke.

== Works ==
See List of compositions by William Boyce

== Sources ==
- Bruce, Robert J. 2005. "Boyce, William (bap. 1711, d. 1779)", Oxford Dictionary of National Biography, Oxford University Press, [2004; online edition, Oct 2005; subscription or UK library membership required]
- Fiske, Roger; Platt, Roger (1995). "Boyce, William". In Sadie, Stanley (ed.). The New Grove Dictionary of Music and Musicians. Vol. 3. London: Macmillan. pp. 138–143. ISBN 0333231112.

Court offices
Preceded by Maurice Greene	Master of the King's Music; 1755–1779	Succeeded by John Stanley
Cultural offices
Preceded by Joseph Kelway	Organist of St Michael, Cornhill; 1736–1768	Succeeded by Theodore Aylward Sr.
