= James S. Warren =

James S. Warren (born: July 3, 1938; died: April 12, 2023) was the director of the counter-terrorism branch of the Canadian Security Intelligence Service (CSIS) in 1985 at the time of the Air India bombing. Mel Deschenes is alternatingly referred to as having held the same position at the same time.

On July 16, 1986 he sent a letter defending CSIS from Royal Canadian Mounted Police allegations that they had been un-cooperative and negligent in tracing the suspects prior to the bombing.

He retired from CSIS in 1994, but was called to testify before the Air India Inquiry - where he stated there was "no deliberate attempt to suppress evidence" relating to the recorded audiotapes that were erased by CSIS.
