= Jim Warren =

Jim Warren may refer to:

- Jim Warren (computer specialist) (1936–2021), mathematician and computer professional
- Jim Warren (drag racer), American Top Fuel driver
- Jim Warren (footballer) (1903–1977), Australian rules footballer
- Jim Warren, founder of Family Tree DNA
- Jim Warren, a live sound engineer for Radiohead

== See also ==
- James Warren (disambiguation)
