= Emily Warren (disambiguation) =

Emily Warren (born 1992) is an American singer.

Emily Warren may also refer to:

- Emily Warren (artist) (1869–1956), artist and illustrator
- Emily Warren (courtesan) (died 1780s), English courtesan
- Emily Warren Roebling (1843–1903), helped complete the Brooklyn Bridge when her husband, Chief Engineer Washington Roebling, fell ill
- Emily Warren (scientist), American physicist
