= Joseph Warren (music editor) =

English composer and music editor

Joseph Warren (1804–1881) was an English musician and composer, best known as a music editor.

== Life ==
Warren was born in London on 20 March 1804. He first studied the violin, and then the piano and organ under J. Stone. At an early age he ran a society of amateurs, for whom he wrote two symphonies and other vocal and instrumental pieces.

In 1843, Warren was appointed organist of St Mary's Roman Catholic Chapel in Chelsea, London. He took an active part in the revival of early English music.

Late in life Warren fell into poverty, and made piecemeal sales from his library, which included some significant early English manuscripts. Finally he became paralysed, and had support from William Hayman Cummings. He died at Bexley on 8 March 1881. At one time he and Edward Francis Rimbault were close friends, but they became public enemies.

== Works ==
Warren's major work was his edition of the Cathedral Music of William Boyce. Planned in November 1843, it was published in 1849. Improving on the original publication, he gave a complete organ accompaniment. He inserted extra services by Robert Creighton the younger and Thomas Tomkins, movements from services by John Blow, Child, and Henry Aldrich, the Burial Service by John Parsons from Edmund Lowe's Short Directions for the performance of Cathedrall Service (1661), anthems by Orlando Gibbons, William Byrd, Blow, Thomas Tallis, and Tomkins, with some chants, and the symphonies to the anthems by Pelham Humfrey and Blow. A life of Boyce and lives of the other composers represented were included.

From 1840, Warren worked as music editor with the firm of Cocks & Co., and edited or arranged much music for them: including a collection of chants, thirty of J. S. Bach's choral-harmonisings (1842), a Chorister's Handbook (1856), and many arrangements for the piano and concertina. He also wrote treatises on composition, orchestral writing, organ-playing, and madrigal-singing, and a method for the concertina.

With John Bishop of Cheltenham, Warren began in 1848 to issue a selection of Early Italian, German, and Flemish music for the Catholic Church, under the title of Repertorium Musicæ Antiquæ, of which two parts appeared. He also edited the collection of John Hilton the younger's Fa-las (1844) for the Musical Antiquarian Society.

Masses and smaller works composed by Warren and performed at the services of St Mary's remained in manuscript. Some pianoforte pieces of his were published.
