= Raymond Warren (disambiguation) =

Raymond Warren (1928–2025), British composer and teacher.

Raymond or Ray Warren may also refer to:

- Ray Warren (born 1943), Australian sports commentator
- Ray Warren (footballer) (1918–1988), English footballer
- T. Raymond Warren, American politician and sheriff
