= Thomas Warren (priest) =

Irish Anglican priest

Thomas Brisbane Warren (b Union Hall, County Cork 26 October 1843 – d Cork 8 January 1894) was a 19th-century Anglican priest.

Warren was educated at Midleton College and Trinity College, Dublin, graduating BA in 1864. He was ordained in 1867 and began his career as a curate at St Peter, Cork, becoming its rector in 1872. In 1885 he moved to be the incumbent at Fermoy and in 1891 was appointed Dean. He died at The Deanery in Cork after a long illness.
