= Warren D. Niederhauser =

American chemist (1918–2005)

- Born: January 2, 1918; Akron, Ohio, US
- Died: January 23, 2005 (aged 87); West Brandywine, Pennsylvania, US
- Education: Oberlin College (AB); University of Wisconsin (PhD)
- Scientific career
- Workplaces: Rohm & Haas
- Thesis: Preparation and reactions of chemical warfare agents (1943)
- Doctoral advisor: Homer Burton Adkins

Warren Dexter Niederhauser (January 2, 1918 – January 23, 2005) was an American chemist who was the president of the American Chemical Society (ACS). He worked at Rohm and Haas chemical company from 1943 to 1985.

== Early life and education ==
Niederhauser was born in Akron, Ohio, and grew up in Gadsden, Alabama. He received a B.S. in chemistry from Oberlin College and Ph.D. in organic chemistry from the University of Wisconsin, Madison (1942).

== Career ==
=== Rohm and Haas ===
Upon graduation, Niederhauser joined Rohm & Haas as head of the surfactant group in 1943. He would work with the company in various positions until his retirement in early 1990s. As an industrial chemist, he held more than 50 patents.

=== American Chemical Society presidency ===
Niederhauser became ACS member in 1942 and began serving as the American Chemical Society national director in 1976 and after seven years ran for the presidency in 1984. During the campaign, his opponent F. Albert Cotton caused a controversy by mailing a letter to selected members describing Niederhauser as "a mediocre industrial chemist".

As the president of ACS, he promoted programs that would increase the professional value of chemists. He urged ACS to take a more active role in monitoring federal research funding plans and supported tax incentives for R&D. He also encouraged industry accountability by publishing the records of employers that flout ACS guidelines.

=== Membership and honors ===
He was a member of the Philadelphia Organic Chemists' Club, the American Institute of Chemists, the Society of Chemical Industry, and the American Association for the Advancement of Science.

In 1985, he received the Henry Hill Award.

== Works ==
- Legal Rights of Chemists and Engineers. Advances in Chemistry. Vol. 161. Washington DC: American Chemical Society. 1 June 1977. doi:10.1021/ba-1977-0161. ISBN 978-0-8412-0357-0. OCLC 990733247.

== Death ==
Niederhauser died on 23 January 2005, at the age of 87.
