= Solomon (Boyce) =

1742 serenata by William Boyce

Solomon is a 75-minute serenata for two solo voices, chorus and orchestra written in 1742 by the English composer William Boyce. The characters are named simply She and He; it is a love story and mildly bawdy. There are several well-known airs: Arise, My Fair; O Fill With Cooling Juice; Softly Rise, O Southern Breeze; Tell Me, Lovely Shepherd; and Ye Blooming Virgins. These have been recorded by various singers, and Solomon in its entirety was recorded by Hyperion in 1989. A performance in June 2014 at London's Queen Elizabeth Hall was aired by the BBC. The overture to Solomon was published during the composer's lifetime as his Symphony No. 6 in F major.
