= Tommy G. Warren =

American film director

- Born: Thomas Glenwood Warren
- Education: Texas A&M / Centenary College
- Alma mater: IMDB/TommyGWarren imdb.me/tommygwarren
- Occupations: Producer, Award winning Director and Writer (see on IMDB, Tommy G Warren ) TWarren Investments, inc. Commercial and Institutional development
- Years active: 1970–present Also, parallel with the Entertainment/Storyworld world Is T.Warren Investments. Major development design/finance/build; and, Software/IT high-tech start-ups...

Tommy G. Warren is an American screenwriter, director and producer. Warren is also CEO/President of TWarren Investments, inc. founded in 1975. Tommy Warren began working in film and video in the 1970s. He has worked on film, videos, and television with MGM and had offices at Paramount Picture, Studios in Hollywood. In 2004, founder and Owner of Spiderwood Productions [SpiderwoodStudios] & [Spiderwood Magic] - began creating feature films, videos, television, music and media. Then in 2009 Warren opened Spiderwood Studios, a full service motion picture, television studios, and backlot along the lower Colorado River just outside Austin, Texas. Warren, the founder and owner of T. Warren Investments, inc. (TwarrenInvestments.com) Other businesses include director at Bold Ventures / Projekt 202 Dallas, Austin & Seattle.

== Early life and career ==
Warren was born Thomas Glenwood Warren in Poplar Bluff, Missouri but grew up in Southern, Arkansas. He bought his first motion picture camera when he was 20 years old. It was an 8 mm wind-up film camera that he used to film documentaries and home movies of his children. Warren started commercial shoots in the late 1960s. He worked on documentaries in the 1970s.

Before segueing into filmmaking, Warren was well known as a pioneer in the development of state and federal correctional facilities. His concepts in land and real estate development also left its mark on the global community and gave him the reputation as a fair man, but an immovable force in business. He has interests in banking management as well as is a player in the music industry. He is an author of several publications, as well as magazine and newspaper articles on productivity, economic development, and labor and management relations, and has been interviewed about these topics with appearances on several television and radio talk shows.

Warren has worked with major motion picture studios, such as DreamWorks and MGM, as a production design consultant. His years of involvement with both domestic and foreign relations made him an invaluable asset on such films as "Red Corner" with Richard Gere. He also produced and wrote several documentary films. In 1996 Warren moved to Hollywood to work on a film with MGM. By 2001 Warren had an office at Paramount Studios. During that time he co-wrote and produced the feature film The Inner Circle. The film takes a dramatic focus on the healing that one relationship goes through after surviving breast cancer and as Tommy says, "it is another story that needed telling."

Warren also developed "StoryWorld" a media and entertainment company involved with storytelling through all sorts of media form with StoryworldMedia.com / .net and StoryworldTransMedia.com / .net

In 2009 Spiderwood Studios Inc. was formed just outside Austin. The studio sits on 200 acres of land along the Colorado River and contains the only groomed for production backlot in the state of Texas.

== Memberships an associations ==
- Association Internationale du Film d'Animation
- International Animated Film Association
- Annual "Annie" Awards (voting member)
- Will Rogers Hollywood Foundation
- imdb.me/tommygwarren

== Awards ==
The Flight of Magic (3D)

- 2012 Indie Fest, Award of Merit for Original Song "Believe"
- 2012 California International Animation Festival, Winner, Audience Favorite
- 2012 Park City Film Music Festival, Finalist for Original Music from the film "Flight of Magic"
- 2012 Newport Beach Film Festival, Official Selection
- 2012 The 33rd Annual Telly Award, Silver Award, Non-Broadcast Productions for Use of Animation
- 2012 The 33rd Annual Telly Award, Bronze Award, Non-Broadcast Productions for Children's Audience
- 2011 The Accolade Competition, Award of Excellence in Animation
- 2011 The Prestige Film Award, Gold Award for Short Film/Video
- 2011 The Prestige Film Award, Gold Award for Holiday Film
- 2011 The Prestige Film Award, Silver Award for Animation
- 2011 The Prestige Film Award, Bronze Award for Original Song "Believe"

"The Inner Circle"

- 2005 'The Inner Circle (EMMA Awards 2005 best feature film)
- 2009 Exceptional Merit in Media Award (National Press Club)

Darker Than Night

- 2014 The Accolade Competition, Award of Excellence for Movie Trailer
- 2014 The Accolade Competition, Award of Merit for Special Effects, non-animation/stunts
- 2014 The Accolade Competition, Award of Merit for Lighting
- 2014 IndieFest Award winner for Dramatic Drama Scene
- 2014 IndeFest Award Winner for Visual Effects in a (non-animated/Stunts)

== Filmography ==
Studio executive at Spiderwood Studios

=== Producer ===
2018 Margarita Man (producer)

2016 "So You Want To Make A Movie" (producer)

2016 Unhinged (executive producer)

2015 Terror Birds (studio executive)

2015 Hot Air (studio executive)

2013 'Darker Than Night' (producer)

2014 Templar: Honor Among Thieves (executive producer, pre-production)

2012 Bad Kids Go to Hell (executive producer)

2012 Doonby (producer)

2013 Flight of Magic (short, executive producer)

2010 Something's Gonna Live (documentary, executive producer)

2006/I Mafiosa (TV series, co-producer, post-production)

2006 Teed Off Too (video, executive producer)

2005 Teed Off: Behind the Tees (video documentary short, executive producer, producer)

2005 Teed Off (video) (executive producer, producer)

2005 The Inner Circle (executive producer, producer)

2003 Hip Hop Get Down (documentary, associate producer)

2003 Inside the Inner Circle (short, executive producer)

=== Writer ===
2013 "Darker Than Night" Thriller

2013 Flight of Magic (short, screenplay and story)

2006 Teed Off Too (video)

2005 Teed Off (video)

2005 Teed Off: Behind the Tees (video documentary short)

2005 The Inner Circle

2006 Night After Christmas

2005 The Orphans

=== Director ===
2013 'Darker Than Night'

2013 Flight of Magic (short)

2005 Teed Off: Behind the Tees (video documentary short)

2003 Inside the Inner Circle (short)

=== Actor ===
2005 The Inner Circle (homebuyer)

Various commercials and promotional videos

=== Art Department ===
2013 'Escape Plan' (technical designer, post-production)

=== Music Department ===
2005 The Inner Circle (music supervisor)

=== Miscellaneous Crew ===
2014 Hot Air (studio Executive)

2013/2014 "Revolution" NBC TV series (studio executive)

2012 It's in the Blood (studio executive)

2010 The Ascent (studio executive)

2009 The Overbrook Brothers (studio executive)

2001 The Tailor of Panama (source: photos - uncredited)

1997 Red Corner (consultant: production design - uncredited)

2011 Disturbed Band, (studio executive) production shoot and location Spiderwood back-lot.

=== Thanks ===
2012 It's in the Blood (special thanks)

2011 Blaze Foley: Duct Tape Messiah (documentary) (special production thanks)

2010 The Ascent (special thanks)

2009 The Overbrook Brothers (special thanks)
