= Edward Royal Warren =

American naturalist and engineer

- Born: 1860; Waltham, Massachusetts, U.S.
- Died: 1942 (aged 81–82)
- Occupation(s): Naturalist; Engineer

Edward Royal Warren (1860–1942) was an American naturalist and engineer.

== Biography ==
Warren was born in 1860 in Waltham, Massachusetts where attended Massachusetts Institute of Technology from which he got his bachelor's degree in 1881. He got his second bachelor's degree in 1883 from the Colorado College where, by 1902, he became full-time naturalist. He was recognised in 1909 for his contributions to Colorado natural history and was made an honorary director of the Colorado College Museum. After it he wrote many books; one Mammals of Colorado was published in 1910, the other The Beaver: Its Work and Its Ways came out in 1927. He died in 1942.
