= Samuel Warren =

Samuel Warren may refer to:

- Sir Samuel Warren (Royal Navy officer) (1769–1839), English naval officer
- Samuel Warren (minister) (1781–1862), English Wesleyan Methodist who formed a breakaway group of "Warrenites", in later life an Anglican priest
- Samuel Warren (British lawyer) (1807–1877), barrister and author, MP for Midhurst from 1856 to 1859, son of the minister
- S. D. Warren (1818–1888), American paper magnate and father of Samuel D. Warren II
- Samuel D. Warren II (1852–1910), American attorney, co-author (with Brandeis) of the classic law review article The Right to Privacy (1890)
- Samuel Prowse Warren, Canadian organist, composer and conductor

== See also ==
- Dr. Samuel Warren House, a historic house in Newton, Massachusetts
