= David Warren =

David Warren may refer to:

- David Warren (American football) (born 1978), former collegiate American football player
- David Warren (diplomat) (born 1952), British diplomat
- David Warren (director), American theatre and television director
- David Warren (inventor) (1925–2010), inventor of the flight data recorder
- David Warren (Medal of Honor) (1836–1900), American Civil War sailor and Medal of Honor recipient
- David Warren (professor), former president of Ohio Wesleyan University, 1984–1993
- David Warren (runner) (born 1956), British distance runner
- David H. Warren, academic administrator and educator
- David H. D. Warren, computer scientist
- Dave Warren (footballer) (born 1981), striker who played for League of Ireland side Cork City
- Dave Warren, Academy Award nominated art director, see 82nd Academy Awards
