= Homer Burton Adkins =

American chemist (1892–1949)

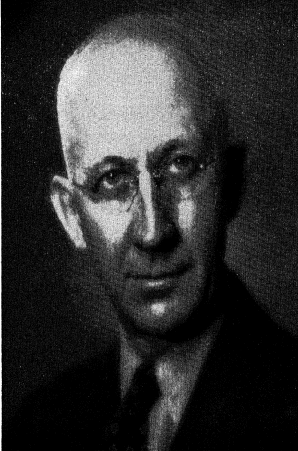
- Homer Burton Adkins
- Born: January 16, 1892; Newport, Ohio
- Died: August 10, 1949 (aged 57); St. Louis, Missouri
- Education: Denison University; Ohio State University (M.S., 1916) (Ph.D., 1918)
- Known for: Hydrogenation of organic compounds, Adam's Catalyst
- Spouse: Louise Spivey
- Scientific career
- Fields: Chemistry; Organic chemistry
- Institutions: University of Wisconsin; Ohio State University
- Doctoral advisor: William Lloyd Evans
- Doctoral students: Ralph Connor, Karl August Folkers, Walter Henry Hartung, Warren D. Niederhauser

Homer Burton Adkins (16 January 1892 – 10 August 1949) was an American chemist who studied the hydrogenation of organic compounds. Adkins was regarded as top in his field and a world authority on the hydrogenation of organic compounds. Adkins is known for his wartime work, where he experimented with chemical agents and poisonous gasses. Renowned for his work, Adkins eventually suffered a series of heart attacks and died in 1949.

== Early life and work ==
Adkins was born on January 16, 1892, in Newport, Ohio, the son of Emily (née Middleswart) and Alvin Adkins. He grew up on a farm with his brother and sister. After attending and finishing high school in Newport, he entered Denison University. Having a reputation as a tall and shy boy, Adkins graduated in three and a half years. Adkins then spent three years at Ohio State University. He took his master's degree in 1916, and his Ph.D. in 1918, under the direction of William Lloyd Evans. After receiving his degree, he began work as a research chemist for the United States Department of War. In the following academic year, Adkins served as an instructor in organic chemistry at Ohio State University and in the summer of 1919 he was a research chemist with E. I. Du Pont De Nemours and Company.

In 1919, Adkins came to the University of Wisconsin–Madison. He remained there each year until his death in 1949, except for two summers he spent working in industry at the Bakelite Corporation in 1924, and 1926 and for responsibilities from 1942 to 1945 as administrator and research director in the war program of the National Defense Research Committee and the Office of Scientific Research and Development. Adkins was a lecturer to graduate students in a course entitled "Survey of Organic Chemistry," but he also kept contact with students in elementary and continued for most of the time to give lectures in the first course in organic chemistry.

In 1919, Adkins began his thesis on the rates of oxidation by potassium permanganate of acetaldehyde, oxalic acid and the rates of reactions having to do with different additions of temperature and molarity. His overall interest was the nature of the intermediate of these reactions. Soon after, he wrote a second paper concerning reaction rates and a third involving the catalytic addition of oxides on esters. His whole research began to revolve around the nature of a product resulting from a reaction depending on the catalyst given. The study on catalysts led to his most important contribution, the hydrogenation of an ester to an alcohol with the use of a copper chromite catalyst. After the study on copper chromite, Adkins delved further and further into hydrogenation reactions and the use of catalysts. A new reaction came out of his research in which hydrogen is added to a double bond on a catalytic surface, the given molecule then splits off into two separate molecules.

Adkins published many books on top of his position as a lecturer and successful researcher. He published his most recognizable book, “Reactions of Hydrogen”, referring to his extensive studies and pioneering of Hydrogenation. He also co-published many of the books students in Organic Chemistry classes studied with. A widely known textbook, “Elementary Organic Chemistry” was co-written by Adkins and published by McGraw-Hill Book Company.

== World War II ==
Throughout World War II, Adkins focused his research on wartime necessities. Many feared that poisonous gases would be used extensively in World War II as they had been during World War I. Adkins' laboratory at Wisconsin engaged in chemical warfare research. Classified documents at the time revealed Adkins and his colleagues describing their research on agents to produce blistering, vomiting, tearing and sneezing. Adkins also studied the removal of the effects of poison agents by using multiple different kinds of chemicals and ointments, combined with protective clothing for soldiers. Due to the magnitude and effect of his work, Adkins was a recipient of the Medal for Merit in 1948 for his wartime studies.

Adkins was a world authority on the hydrogenation of organic compounds and he developed the Adkins catalyst partly based on interrogation of German chemists after World War II in relation to the Fischer–Tropsch process. Adkins also coined the word hydrogenolysis to describe the chemical reaction in which a molecule is broken into smaller molecules by the reaction of hydrogen. He developed the Adkins–Peterson reaction with Wesley J. Peterson.

== Later life and death ==
While he was a graduate student at the Ohio State University, Adkins married Louise Spivey, who was a classmate of his at Denison and who was teaching high school mathematics. The pair had three children: Susanne, Nance, and Roger. He had three grandchildren from Susanne.

Adkins enjoyed leisure activities, such as golfing, as he found it was relaxing and he needed the exercise.

Teaching, maintaining a large research program, and war time pressure took a heavy toll on Adkins' strength. While playing a game of golf in the late spring of 1949, Adkins suffered a minor heart attack. He concluded that as soon as he had the chance to get treatment, he would. After a meeting with other interested chemists regarding his research, Adkins suffered a larger heart attack and was hospitalized for roughly a month. Adkins' condition seemed to improve, so he was sent home. His health suddenly again began failing rapidly. Weakened and bed-ridden, Adkins died in Madison, Wisconsin, on August 12, 1949.

== Awards and honours ==
During his lifetime, Adkins received many honors. He received an honorary Doctor of Science degree from Denison University, his alma mater, in 1938. President Harry S. Truman awarded Adkins with the Medal for Merit. In 1942, Adkins was accepted as a member of the National Academy of Sciences.

=== Legacy ===
After his death, Adkins' many former students and friends founded the Homer Adkins Fellowship, which supported a graduate student in chemistry at the University of Wisconsin.

President Edwin B. Fred of the University of Wisconsin said, "He was recognized as one of the leading chemists that America has produced. He was the kind of man who makes a University distinguished." President James B. Conant of Harvard said, "the academic world has suffered an irreparable loss."

== Bibliography ==
- Daniels, Farrington (1952). Biographical Memoirs National Academy Of Sciences Vol XXVII. The National Academy Of Sciences.
- Shearer, Benjamin (2007). Home Front Heroes: A Biographical Dictionary of Americans During Wartime, Volume 1. Greenwood Press. ISBN 978-0313334214.
