= Clem Warren =

English footballer

Personal information
- Full name: Clement Edwin Warren
- Date of birth: 28 July 1899
- Place of birth: Nuneaton, England
- Date of death: 1956 (aged 56–57)
- Position: Winger

Senior career*
Years	Team	Apps	(Gls)
1920–1921	Herberts Athletic		
1921–1923	Coventry City	18	(3)
1923–1924	Yeovil & Petters United		
1924–1925	Walsall	0	(0)
1925	Worcester City		
Total		18	(3)
- * Club domestic league appearances and goals

Clement Edwin Warren (28 July 1899 – 1956) was an English footballer who played in the Football League for Coventry City.
