= Kenneth Warren =

Kenneth Warren may refer to:

- Kenneth Warren (cricketer) (1926–2008), Barbadian cricketer
- Kenneth Warren (politician) (1926–2019), British politician
- Kenneth F. Warren, American professor of political science at Saint Louis University
- Kenneth J. Warren (1929–1973), Australian actor
- Kenneth S. Warren (1929–1996), American physician and scientist
- Kenneth W. Warren (born 1957), American professor of English at the University of Chicago
