= Richard Warren (disambiguation) =

Richard Warren (c. 1583–1628) was a Mayflower passenger.

Richard Warren may also refer to:

- Richard Warren (Australian politician) (1869–1940), member of the Queensland Legislative Assembly
- Richard Warren (Irish politician) (died 1735), member of the Irish House of Commons
- Richard Warren (Jacobite) (1705–1775), Irish Jacobite soldier
- Richard Warren (musician) (born 1973), British musician, songwriter and producer
- Richard Warren (physician) (1731–1797), English society doctor
- Richard Warren (Royal Navy officer) (1806–1875), Royal Navy officer
- Richard Benson Warren (1784-1848), Irish barrister
- Rick Warren (born 1954), American evangelical Christian pastor and author
