= Andy Warren (Canadian musician) =

Canadian independent musician

- Genres: Blue-eyed soul
- Occupations: Singer, songwriter, musician
- Years active: 2004–present
- Website: a-dub.com

Andy Warren is a Canadian independent musician. He currently resides in Vancouver, British Columbia, Canada.

His music has been characterized as genre-crossing "Vancouver folk soul" and "an eclectic, Ben Harperish amalgam of poly rhythms laid over jazz, funk, soul and folk/roots elements".

== Discography ==
- 2004 Those Three
- 2006 The Blurring Line (EP)
- 2006 The Blurring Line (Single)
