= Tom Warren (rugby union) =

English rugby union player

- Born: Thomas John Warren; 14 January 1983 (age 43) Sevenoaks, Kent, England
- Height: 6 ft 1 in (1.85 m)
- Weight: 120 kg (265 lb)
- School: Tonbridge School

Rugby union career
- Position: Prop
Youth career
- Worcester Warriors Academy
Senior career
Years	Team	Apps	(Points)
2000–2003	Worcester Warriors	23	
2003–2004	Stade Domontoise	22	
2004–2008	London Irish	28	
2008–2009	Gran Parma Rugby	26	
2009–2011	Esher RFC	22	
–	Retired		
Coaching career
- Years: Team
- 2010–2012: Esher RFC

Tom Warren (born 14 January 1983 in Sevenoaks, Kent, England) is a retired rugby union player who played for Gran Parma Rugby in the Italian National Championship of Excellence. He previously played for London Irish in the Guinness Premiership. Warren's position of choice is as a prop.
