= Joseph Warren (Mississippi politician) =

Political figure

Member of the Mississippi House of Representatives from the 90th district
- In office 1980–2016
- Succeeded by: Noah Sanford

Personal details
- Born: May 31, 1952 (age 74) Magee, Mississippi, United States
- Party: Democratic

Joseph L. Warren (born May 31, 1952) is an American politician. He was a member of the Mississippi House of Representatives from the 90th District, being first elected in 1979 and serving until 2016. He is a member of the Democratic party.
