= San Luis Rey complex =

The San Luis Rey Complex is an archaeological pattern representing the latest phase of prehistory in the region occupied at the time of European contact by the Luiseño Indians. Studies by Clement W. Meighan and Delbert L. True in northern San Diego County, California, defined the complex, which is also represented in adjacent portions of Riverside and Orange counties.

Current estimates put the beginning of the San Luis Rey Complex at around AD 500–1000. The primary traits that distinguish this complex from the locally preceding San Dieguito, La Jolla, and Pauma complexes are the presence of small projectile points (indicative of use of the bow and arrow), pottery, and the practice of cremation. Other San Luis Rey Complex lithic tools include mortars and metates (both bedrock and portable), pestles and manos, flaked edge tools (scrapers and knives), hammers, drills, steatite arrow straighteners, pendants, beads, and quartz crystals. Shell ornaments and bone tools are also present. Red and black geometrical pictographs were painted.

Chronologically, two phases of the complex were proposed. San Luis Rey I was distinguished from San Luis Rey II primarily by the appearance of pottery in the latter, an introduction that was estimated to have occurred as late as AD 1500 or even 1750. Subsequent studies have pushed the local presence of pottery back to at least AD 1000 and perhaps several centuries earlier, calling into question the validity of the phase distinction.

A northern limit for the San Luis Rey Complex is defined by the scarcity or absence of prehistoric pottery among the Luiseño's Gabrielino and Serrano kinsmen. To the east, in the Colorado Desert, the Tizon Brown Ware pottery made by the Luiseño was replaced by the Lower Colorado Buff Ware and Salton Brown Ware of the Patayan Complex.

To the south, True made detailed archaeological comparisons between the San Luis Rey Complex and the Cuyamaca Complex, produced by the Luiseño's linguistically unrelated but culturally similar neighbors, the Kumeyaay. Perhaps the strongest distinction found by True was between the roughly equal frequencies of Desert Side-notched and Cottonwood Triangular points in the Cuyamaca Complex and the scarcity of Desert Side-notched points in the San Luis Rey Complex. This contrast was based primarily on comparisons between sites on Palomar Mountain and in Cuyamaca Rancho. In coastal and inland valley portions of Luiseño and Kumeyaay territories, the differences are less pronounced.

The San Luis Rey Complex has been studied primarily in the middle and upper watershed of the San Luis Rey River. For this region, True proposed a bipolar fission/fusion model of settlement. Groups of people were believed to have congregated during the winter months at main villages in the river valley and then dispersed during the summer to higher-elevation sites on Palomar Mountain. Different settlement systems may have existed among groups that exploited coastal resources.
