= Delbert Leroy True =

American archaeologist

D. L. True (August 31, 1923 – June 20, 2001) was an archaeologist who worked in California, particularly San Diego County, and in northern Chile.

Born in San Pedro, California, son of a lumberyard foreman, True worked in a shipyard and served as an aerial-gunnery instructor for the U.S. Army Air Corps during World War II. After the war he established a small avocado ranch in Pauma Valley, an inland area in northern San Diego County, also working as a school bus driver.

True became interested in and thoroughly familiar with the archaeological remains of the Pauma region's prehistoric cultures. Under the mentorship of Clement W. Meighan, he enrolled in anthropology at the University of California, Los Angeles, where he was cited by Time magazine as one of the dozen top graduates in 1961. He went on to receive his doctorate from UCLA in 1966, with a dissertation entitled "Archaeological Differentiation of Shoshonean and Yuman Speaking Groups in Southern California". He served on the anthropology faculty of the University of California, Davis, from 1965 until his retirement.

True was instrumental in defining the Pauma, San Luis Rey, and Cuyamaca complexes and in elucidating their roles in regional prehistory. Together with Claude N. Warren, he also helped to clarify understanding of the early San Dieguito and La Jolla complexes.
