= Elizabeth Warren (disambiguation) =

Elizabeth Warren (born 1949) is an American attorney, professor and politician.

Elizabeth Warren may also refer to:

- Betty Ford (previously Elizabeth Warren; 1918–2011), First Lady of the United States
- Elizabeth Andrew Warren (1786–1864), British botanist
- Elizabeth von Till Warren (1934–2021), American historian and preservationist
- Myrtle Elizabeth Warren, fictional character from Harry Potter
- Elizabeth "Eri" Warren, fictional character from Softenni

== See also ==
- Elizabeth Farren (c. 1759–1829), Irish actress
- Elizabeth Warden (disambiguation)
- Warren (name)
