= Pauma Complex =

The Pauma Complex is a prehistoric archaeological pattern among Indigenous peoples of California, initially defined by Delbert L. True in northern San Diego County, California.

The complex is dated generally to the middle Holocene period. This makes it locally the successor to the San Dieguito complex, predecessor to the late prehistoric San Luis Rey Complex, and contemporary with the La Jolla complex on the San Diego County coast.

Pauma Complex sites have been identified primarily in the San Luis Rey River valley and on the Valley Center plateau to the south of it.

Archaeological traits distinguishing the Pauma Complex include:

- a high frequency of shaped manos
- the presence of finely worked small domed scrapers
- the presence of knives and points
- the presence of discoidals and cogged stones
- a predominance of grinding tools over flaked tools
- a predominance of deep basin metates over slab metates
- a predominance of cobble hammers over core hammers
- a low frequency of cobble tools
- a scarcity of cobble choppers and cobble scrapers
- a predominance of volcanic rock over quartzite as a source material for flaked lithics
- an extreme scarcity of obsidian
