= Claude Nelson Warren =

American archaeologist (1932–2021)

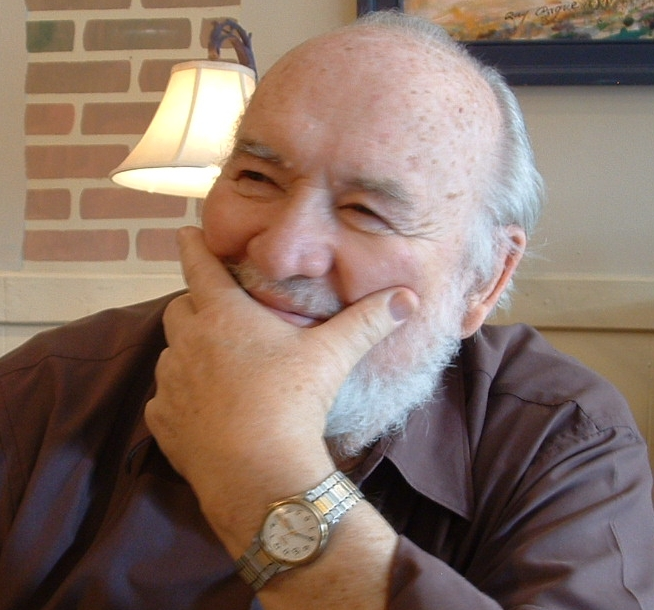
- Warren in 2007
- Born: March 18, 1932; Goldendale, Washington, U.S.
- Died: November 4, 2021 (aged 89); Las Vegas, Nevada, U.S.
- Education: University of California, Los Angeles
- Occupation: Archaeologist
- Known for: Defining the San Dieguito and La Jolla cultural complexes.
- Title: Distinguished Professor Emeritus
- Spouse: Elizabeth von Till Warren
- Scientific career
- Fields: Archaeology
- Workplaces: University of Nevada, Las Vegas
- Thesis: Cultural change and continuity on the San Diego coast (1964)
- Doctoral advisor: C.W. Meighan

Claude Nelson Warren (March 18, 1932 – November 4, 2021) was a California Desert anthropologist and specialist in early humans in the Far West and was instrumental in defining the San Dieguito and La Jolla cultural complexes. His Ph.D. dissertation proved that Native Americans lived in the San Diego coastal area 10,000 years ago, much earlier than previously thought. He also had an interest in the history of anthropology.

He was a distinguished professor emeritus in Anthropology from the University of Nevada, Las Vegas.

He was married to Elizabeth von Till Warren until her death. They had four children: Claude Jr., Susan, Louis, and Jonathan.

His papers are available at Special Collections, University of Nevada, Las Vegas.

== Early life ==
Born in Goldendale, Washington, on March 18, 1932, to Hubert Samuel Warren and Dorthy Hope Rodgers Warren, he was the youngest of four children who included historian James Ronald Warren. He attended Kitsap Jr. High School in Poulsbo, Washington. In 1947 he moved with his mother and sister to Tenino where he attended high school, graduating in 1950. While at Tenino he played football and basketball. During his junior year he reported on Tenino High School sports for the Thurston County Independent. He was editor of the school paper and yearbook and was named to all-conference football and basketball teams his senior year. He graduated 3rd in his class of 21 students.

From 1950 to 1952 Warren attended Centralia Junior College. While the Korean War was under way, he wrote an editorial entitled "Weapons Against War" which was reprinted by the Centralia Daily newspaper, despite the fact that he took a position that young men should not interrupt their college careers to enlist in military service.

== Early archeology ==
In 1953 Warren attended an archaeological summer field school near Vantage, Washington, where he met Earl H. Swanson Jr. and Robert H. Crabtree, both of whom became lifelong friends. This field school introduced Warren to archaeological field work and the archaeology of the Columbia Plateau.

Warren received his Bachelor of Arts degree in anthropology from the University of Washington in 1954 and in the fall of that year began graduate work in anthropology at Northwestern University, Evanston, Illinois, as a Carnegie Follow in the African Studies Program. While at Northwestern he studied under Melville J. Herskovits. Warren's later work would be influenced by Herskovits' concept of cultural relativism. While at Northwestern Warren met and, in December, 1955, married Elizabeth von Till who was also attending Northwestern as Carnegie Follow in the African Studies Program.

In the summer of 1955 Warren conducted a brief archaeological survey on the lower Columbia River, under the direction of Doug Osborne, for Washington State Museum.

In the winter of 1955 Warren returned to Washington, where he continued his studies at the University of Washington, Seattle, and earned his Master of Arts in 1959. In the summer of 1956 Warren supervised excavations at the Goldendale site in Washington and the Wenas Creek site on the Yakima River. This work, as well as the 1955 survey, provided the material for Warren's first professional papers. Of these, The View from Wenas: A Study in Plateau Prehistory has proven to be the most important, as it described a series of deep, stratified deposits that are part of the Plateau cultural sequence and contributed to the synthesis of the region's prehistory.

In 1957 Warren served as an assistant field director at the Fort Okanogon excavations under the supervision of Earl H. Swanson.

== Professional career ==
In 1958, while completing his Master's thesis at UCLA, Warren took a position as the junior Research Archaeologist with the University of California Archaeological Survey in Los Angeles. He remained with the survey for three years. During his tenure at the survey, Warren taught a summer field school in archaeology at Cedar City, Utah. Warren also conducted field work on sites in Kern, Los Angeles, Orange and San Diego counties as well as on San Clemente Island. Warren Canyon on San Clemente Island was named in honor of his findings there. The San Diego archaeology has proven instrumental in defining the San Dieguito and La Jolla cultural complexes.

Warren and True's (1961) The San Dieguito Complex and Its Place in California Prehistory has been cited in many syntheses of early man in the Far West. Warren et al.'s (1961) Early Gathering Cultures on the San Diego Coast: Results and Interpretations of an Archaeological Survey contains the first descriptive typology for the La Jolla artifact assemblage and has been instrumental in the chronological placement of the La Jolla assemblage.

In 1962 Warren was appointed the State of Idaho's first highway archaeologist. This half time appointment was held concurrently with a half time teaching position at Idaho State University in Pocatello.

During this time Warren's report on CA-SDi-603 on Batiquitos Lagoon (Warren and Pavesic 1963) evidences his growing interest in environmental archaeology.

Warren's Doctoral dissertation (1964), Cultural Change and Continuity on the San Diego Coast, has been important in establishing the chronology of culture on the San Diego coast, and reflects the influence of Herskovits on Warren's model of culture change. Upon completion of his Ph.D. In 1964, he accepted an appointment as a full-time Assistant Professor at Idaho State. While at Idaho State University, Warren conducted research at sites in Idaho and California, including work in Hell's Canyon (Warren, Sims and Pavesic 1968) and sites excavated as part of the “highway salvage” program in Idaho (Warren et al. 1971).

In 1967 the University of California, Santa Barbara (UCSB) offered Warren an assistant professorship in anthropology. While At UCSB Warren conducted research in the Mojave Desert and taught archaeological field schools on the Santa Barbara coast.

Warren had been awarded grants from the National Science Foundation, Faculty Research Grants at Idaho State University and Faculty Research Grants at UCSB, to study further the San Dieguito and Lake Mojave complexes, and for excavations at Pleistocene Lake Mojave. Research conducted with John Decosta and H. T. Ore at Lake Mojave, along with excavations at the C. W. Harris site in the mid-1960s defined Warren's career as a California Desert archaeologist (Warren and True, 1961; Warren and Decosta 1964; Warren 1966, 1967; Decosta and Warren 1967; Ore and Warren 1971; Warren and Ore 1978).

Warren moved to the University of Nevada, Las Vegas (UNLV) in 1969 as an associate professor. He was elected chair of the Department of Anthropology and Sociology (1970–1972) during his first academic year there.

During this time he was instrumental in developing the M.A. program in anthropology and establishing the Ethnic Studies Program. From 1991 to 1994, Warren again served as chair of the Department of Anthropology and Ethnic Studies. It was during his latter tenure as chair that he initiated the Ph.D. program in anthropology, which was approved in the spring of 1998.

Between 1969 and 1981, Warren taught the UNLV Lost City Field School (1970, 1972–1980). In 1971 he taught the joint UNLV-UCLA field school at Santa Barbara. It was during the 1969 and 1971 field schools that Warren developed an interest in the analysis of California Mission records. Other obligations kept him from delving deeply into this area of study, but he did publish two papers (Warren, 1976; Warren and Hodge 1980) that proved the potential for this type of research and laid out some methodological guidelines.

In the summer of 1970, after teaching at Lost City, Warren was hired to direct a program to teach archaeological field methods to Shoshoni-Bannock Indian youths at Fort Hall Reservation in Idaho.

In 1972 Warren volunteered to begin archaeological survey and excavation of the Old Las Vegas Mormon Fort, which later became the Old Las Vegas Mormon Fort State Historic Park. His work was performed at the request of the "Hold the Fort" campaign to preserve the original building, the oldest in Las Vegas, by an organization founded by Anna Dean Kepper and Elizabeth von Till Warren, called Friends of the Fort (which later became the Preservation Association of Clark County). Claude Warren's initial excavation established the parameters for an archaeology contract later granted to others to excavate the remainder of the site.

Warren followed up the excavation of the Old Las Vegas Fort with the excavation in 1973 of the Stewart Family Plot nearby. This excavation of the graves of a pioneer Las Vegas family came about when a local mortuary purchased their old family plot and moved the graves of Helen J. Stewart and her family.

Also In 1972, Warren performed an archaeological survey at the Las Vegas Springs, also known as Big Springs. His discoveries of long-term human occupation there helped re-route the Oran K. Cragson Expressway (US 95) through the heart of Las Vegas, so that it went around the site instead of through it. During these discussions the freeway's new route became known as "The Warren Curve," or sometimes "Claude's Curve". Warren's wife Elizabeth von Till Warren and her colleagues created Friends of Big Springs, a group of concerned citizens which used Warren's findings to add the Las Vegas Springs to the National Register of Historic Places.

On the 50th anniversary of Warren's findings at the Las Vegas Springs, his records from that archaeological reconnaissance were published by the Springs Preserve, under the direction of Archaeologist Dr. Nathan Harper.

In July 1988 the City of Las Vegas sought to develop a water retention basin on the archaeological site at Las Vegas Springs. Warren's wife Elizabeth von Till Warren testified against the proposal, but was rebuffed and the retention basin was preliminarily approved. This led to a heated exchange of Warren and City of Las Vegas Mayor Ron Lurie, who challenged Warren to prove to him that there was any archaeological site worth saving at Las Vegas Springs. According to Warren, the two men agreed to a face-off at the Springs the following morning. Many onlookers including members of the press, Warren's sons and UNLV students were present. Mayor Lurie toured the site and immediately agreed with Warren. The Mayor then moved and re-configured the water retention basin to preserve the Site. The Las Vegas Springs site later became the Las Vegas Springs Preserve.

From 1981 to 1984, Warren directed the Fort Irwin Archaeological Project under contract from Dames and Moore. During the 1980s, Warren was joined by his wife on visits to their son Louis, who was educated extensively abroad. Claude Warren developed an interest in the history of Archaeology as a science, as well as visiting various ruins in England, France and later at Great Zimbabwe.

In addition to summer field schools, Warren taught Saturday field classes nearly every year of the 28 years he was a faculty member at UNLV. He retired from UNLV in 1996 to a tremendous surprise party hosted by generations of family and friends, at the San Diego Museum of Man at Balboa Park, San Diego.

During his active teaching in the late 1980s and after retiring from UNLV, Warren became the principal archaeologist under contract at Joshua Tree National Park, where he continued to teach archaeological field schools, as well as publish decades of findings. Warren purchased a second home on Park Blvd., 2.5 miles from the West Entrance Station of Joshua Tree National Park, in the mid 1990s. The rough house and its rocky outcropping overlooking the valley hosted field school students well into the 2000s. It has come to be known as "Pinto Point", a nod to the body of Warren's archaeological work.

Warren's travels abroad during the 1990s took him to archaeological sites in Cyprus, Egypt and Israel, often visiting former students or colleagues.

== History of archaeology ==
Warren published his first paper on the history of archaeology in 1970. His Time and Topography, Elizabeth Crozer Campbell's Approach to The Prehistory of California Deserts was followed by his authoring the chapter California in Fitting's (1973) The Development of North American Archaeology. Warren has written histories of the archaeology of the San Diego coast and the Mojave Desert.

In 1989 Warren began archival research on the works of William Pengelly which resulted in a small monograph on Pengelly's excavation methods and techniques (Warren and Rose 1994). As an outgrowth of the research, Warren presented a paper entitled The Empirical Evidence for the Antiquity of Mankind at Brixham Cave at the 1998 meetings of the Society for American Archaeology.

In 2012 Warren completed "Purple Hummingbird: A Biography of Elizabeth Warder Crozer Campbell." Elizabeth Campbell was an early desert archaeologist at Joshua Tree, California.

== Awards and recognition ==
- Warren was named the Barrick Distinguished Scholar by UNLV in 1988
- In 1994 the Southwestern Anthropological Association named him a distinguished lecturer.
- He was presented the Lifetime Achievement Award of the Society for California Archaeology in 1996.
- He was the Regents' Outstanding Teacher in 1998.
- In April 2012, he was awarded the Nevada Archaeological Association's Silver Trowel Lifetime Achievement Award
- In May 2021 he received the Excellence in Preservation award from the Las Vegas Historic Preservation Commission. During the award ceremony, the City Council dubbed to Claude N. Warren and Elizabeth von Till Warren not only award winners, but "Protectors of History." Unable to receive the award himself, his son Jonathan received the awards for Claude N. Warren and Elizabeth von Till Warren in person.
- Warren received the Great Basin Anthropological Association Founders Award for Lifetime Achievement at the 2021 conference in Las Vegas. He was unable to attend and his sons, Claude Jr, and Jonathan, received the award in his name.

== Publications ==
Warren has published over 80 titles and presented over 67 papers at professional meetings. The publications listed below are referenced above. A more complete bibliography has been published by the Society for California Archaeology.

Warren, Claude N; True, D.L. (1961). "The San Dieguito Complex and Its Place in California Prehistory". Archaeological Survey Annual Report 1960-61. Los Angeles, California: University of California: 246–338.

Warren, Claude N; True, D.L.; Eudey, A.A. (1961). "Early Gathering Cultures on the San Diego Coast: Results and Interpretations of an Archaeological Survey". Archaeological Survey Annual Report 1960-61. Los Angeles, California: University of California: 1–106.

Warren, Claude N; Pavesic, Max G. (1963). "Shell Midden analysis at Site SDi-603 and Ecological Implications for Cultural Developments of Batiquitos Lagoon, San Diego County, California". Archaeological Survey Annual Report 1962-1963. Los Angeles, California: University of California: 307–438.

Warren, Claude N (1968). "The View From Wenas: A Study in Plateau Prehistory". Occasional Papers of the Idaho State University Museum (24). Pocatello, Idaho: Idaho State University.

Warren, Claude N (1970). "Time and Topography: Elizabeth W. C. Campbell's Approach to California Desert Prehistory". The Masterkey. 44 (1). Los Angeles, California: Southwest Museum: 5–14.

Warren, Claude; Alexander, Lawrence; Charest, A. Peter; von Till Warren, Elizabeth (1972). Final Report - Archaeological Reconnaissance at Bit Springs (Technical report). Las Vegas, Nevada: Dept. of Anthropology-Sociology, University of Nevada, Las Vegas.

Warren, Claude; Kepper, Anna Dean (1972). Fact sheet regarding Fort Churchill. s.l.: s.n.

Warren, Claude (1980). A cultural resource overview for the Amargosa-Mojave basin planning units. Las Vegas, Nevada: University of Nevada, Las Vegas.

Harten, Lcuille B; Warren, Claude; Tuohy, Donald R (1980). Anthropological papers in memory of Earl H. Swanson, Jr. Pocatello, Idaho: Idaho Museum of Natural History.

Warren, Claude (1982). Prehistoric developments at Atlatl Rock. Las Vegas, Nevada: s.n.

Warren, Claude; Rose, Susan (1994). William Pengelly's Spits, yards and prisms : the forerunners of modern excavation methods and techniques in archaeology. Torquay, England: Torquay Natural History Society.

Warren, Claude N (1998). "The Empirical Evidence for the Antiquity of Man: Brixham Cave". Seattle, Washington: Society for American Archaeology.

Warren, C N (2004). "The Stratigraphic Evidence for the Antiquity of Man at Brixham Cave in 1858". BAR International Series (Supplementary). 1256. Oxford, England: British Archaeological Reports: 219–220.

Warren, Claude; Schneider, Joan S. (2017). Purple Hummingbird: A Biography of Elizabeth Warder Crozer Campbell. Salt Lake City, Utah: University of Utah Press.
