= Malcolm Rogers =

Malcolm Rogers may refer to:

- Malcolm Rogers (actor) (1929–2022), British television actor in For the Love of Ada etc.
- Malcolm Jennings Rogers (1890–1960), archaeologist
- Malcolm Rogers (curator) (born 1948), director of the Museum of Fine Arts, Boston
