= Keuper (surname) =

Keuper is a surname. Notable people with the surname include:

- Jerome P. Keuper (1921–2002), American physicist
- Ken Keuper (1918–1997), American football player

== See also ==
- Kepper
