= List of San Diego Historical Landmarks in La Jolla =

In 1967, the City of San Diego, California, established a Historical Resources Board with the authority to designate and protect the city's landmark buildings and structures. In total, the city has designated more than 1500 structures or other properties as historical landmarks.

The Historical Landmarks listed here are located in the La Jolla and Torrey Pines areas. Four of the properties have also received recognition at the federal level by inclusion on the National Register of Historic Places and one—the George H. Scripps Memorial Marine Biological Laboratory—by designation as a National Historic Landmark.

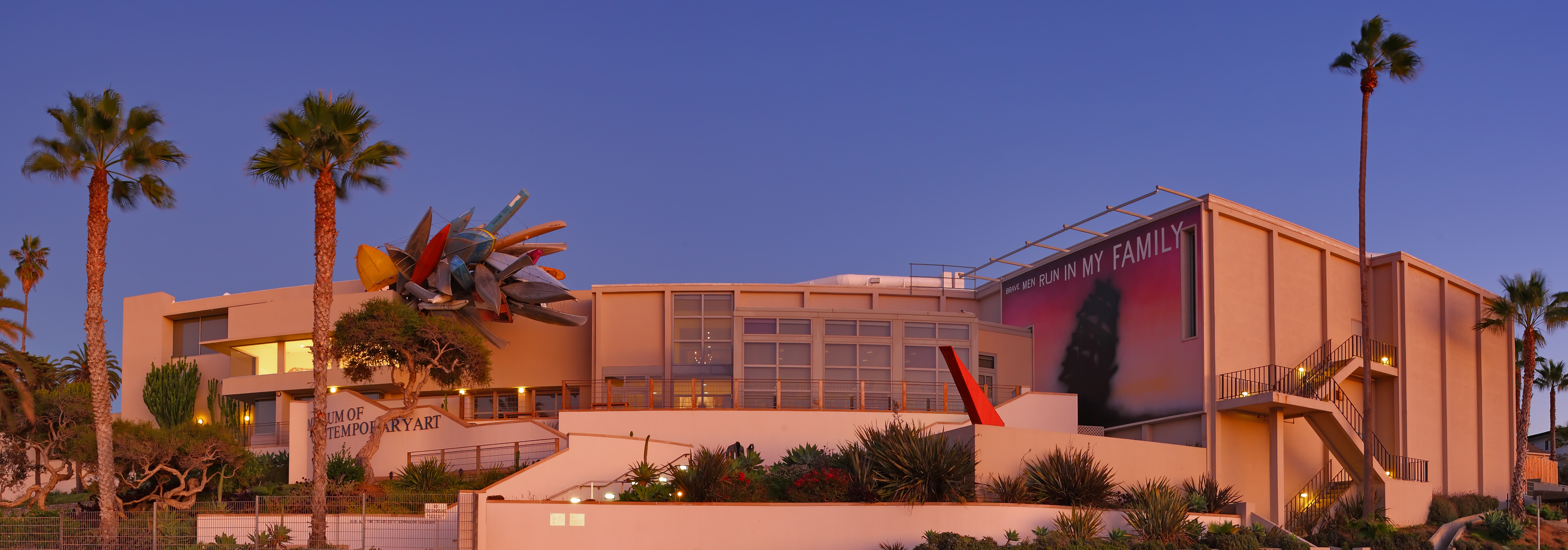
The La Jolla branch of the Museum of Contemporary Art San Diego, incorporating the 1915 Gill-designed Ellen Browning Scripps residence (not visible in this view)

The sites designated as landmarks include numerous structures designed by early Modern architect Irving J. Gill. Also included is the Torrey Pines Area and several sites connected to La Jolla's long association with scientific research, including the George H. Scripps Memorial Marine Biological Laboratory and the Salk Institute for Biological Studies.

== Listing ==
SDHL #	Landmark name	Image	Address	Designation Date	Description
10	Torrey Pines Area		Torrey Pines State Reserve; 32°55′15″N 117°15′11″W	11/21/1969	Coastal park remains one of the wildest stretches of land (8 km²) on the Southern California coast; consists of a plateau with cliffs that overlook Torrey Pines State Beach, and a lagoon used by migrating seabirds
79	La Jolla Woman's Club		715 Silverado St. 32°50′38″N 117°16′37″W	3/2/1973	Clubhouse building designed by Irving Gill and built in 1914
84	Green Dragon Colony site		1258-1274 Prospect St. 32°50′58″N 117°16′16″W	7/6/1973	Group of 12 coastal cottages built by German immigrant Anna Held Heinrich; became an artists colony; the remaining four cottages were demolished in 1991
86	La Jolla Recreational Center		615 Prospect St. 32°50′35″N 117°16′39″W	9/7/1973	Built in 1915 by Ellen Browning-Scripps and dedicated that same year to the City of San Diego for the children of La Jolla; designed by Irving Gill
101	Red Roost and Red Rest		1187 and 1179 Coast Blvd. 32°50′59″N 117°16′21″W	1/3/1975	Built in 1894, oldest surviving examples of late-Victorian beach cottage architecture; also known as the Neptune and Cove Tea Room; vacant since the 1980s and subject of controversy over "demolition by neglect"; Red Rest burned in November 2020.
102	Tyrolean Terrace Colony		1290-1298 Prospect St. 32°50′56″N 117°16′14″W	2/7/1975	Built in 1911; demolished in 1975 to make room for Coast Walk Shopping Center
108	Pottery Canyon Park		2725 Torrey Pines Rd. 32°51′08″N 117°14′42″W	2/6/1976	Five small structures; three built on park land in 1928, other two on private land
117	El Pueblo Ribera		230-248 Gravilla St.; 231-309 Playa del Sur; 32°49′43″N 117°16′44″W	2/4/1977	Pueblo Revival structures built in 1923, designed by architect Rudolph Schindler
119	George H. Scripps Memorial Marine Biological Laboratory		8602 La Jolla Shores Dr. 32°51′54″N 117°15′12″W	5/6/1977	Oldest oceanographic research building in continuous use in the United States built in 1909, as part of the Scripps Institution of Oceanography, the nation's first oceanographic institute founded in 1903
128	Heritage Place La Jolla		7212 La Jolla Blvd. 32°50′07″N 117°16′40″W	7/7/1978	Structure built in 1917 by Horace E. Rhoads; moved in 1928 from 1044-1046 Wall St.
133	Galusha B. Grow Cottage		484 Arenas St.	2/16/1979	Cottage built in 1895, moved to Heritage Place from 7831 Ivanhoe Ave. in Dec. 1979
164	La Jolla Fire Station Engine Company 13		7877 Herschel Ave. 32°50′48″N 117°16′22″W	6/30/1982	Built in 1913; associated with Harold Abrams
166	Wisteria Cottage		780 Prospect St. 32°50′42″N 117°16′38″W	8/25/1982	Cottage built in 1904; remodeled in 1907 by Irving Gill
179	George Kautz House		7753 Draper Ave. 32°50′37″N 117°16′37″W	9/28/1983	House built in 1913; associated with Irving Gill; addition allowed at rear in 1984
181	The Little Hotel by the Sea		8045 Jenner St. 32°50′50″N 117°16′34″W	11/30/1983	Built 1924-1925; additions in 1928 and 1939; associated with architect Thomas Shepherd
204	La Valencia Hotel		1132 Prospect St. 32°50′55″N 117°16′25″W	1/14/1987	Built in 1909; originally called Cabrillo Hotel and renamed La Valencia West; remodeled in 1959; addition permitted in 1987
212	Casa de Manana-Casa Madre		849 Coast Blvd. 32°50′47″N 117°16′40″W	12/2/1987	Built in 1924; associated with architect Edgar Ullrich
213	Casa de Manana		722, 809, 825 Coast Blvd. 32°50′47″N 117°16′40″W	12/2/1987	Built in 1924; associated with architect Edgar Ullrich; approval granted to demolish structures at 809 and 825 Coast Blvd.
226	Morgan-Larkins-Marrone Residence		7149 & 7150 Monte Vista Ave. 32°50′05″N 117°16′45″W	5/25/1988	English Tudor Revival house built in 1931 and 1935; designed by Edgar Ullrich
228	La Jolla Public Library		1006 Wall St. 32°50′48″N 117°16′27″W	7/27/1988	Built in 1921; associated with William Templeton Johnson
229	The Athenaeum		1008 Wall Street	7/27/1988	Built in 1956; associated with William Lumpkins
230	Parker Office Building		7917 Girard Ave. 32°50′49″N 117°16′27″W	7/27/1988	Built 1928-1930; associated with Thomas Shepherd; interior remodeled
234	Scripps Memorial Hospital and Clinic		464, 476 Prospect St. 32°50′32″N 117°16′46″W	4/26/1989	Built 1924-1928; designed by Louis Gill; designated structures include Scripps Building, 1918 - first structure used as a clinic; Copley Building added 1949-1951
286	Dr. Rodes House-Brockton Villa		1235 Coast Boulevard	8/22/1990	Built 1894; companion structure to Red Roof & Red Roost
288	Coast Walk Trail and Devil's Footbridge	Coast Walk Trail	8/22/1990	Located between Cave St. and Torrey Pines Rd.; trail renovated in 1931	
294	Colonial Inn project sites		915, 921, 925, 927 Coast Boulevard	1/30/1991	
295	Mount Soledad Park and Memorial Cross		Soledad Road; 32°50′23″N 117°14′40″W	8/22/1990	Became a public park in August 1916
304	Salk Institute for Biological Studies		10010 N. Torrey Pines Rd. 32°53′14″N 117°14′46″W	2/27/1991	Research institute founded in 1960 by Jonas Salk; Modernist campus designed by Louis Kahn
314	Martha Kinsey Residence		1624 Ludington Lane	3/25/1992	House built in 1937; associated with Lilian Rice
315	Torrey Pines Gliderport		South of Torrey Pines Golf Course and Torrey Pines St. Pk.; west of Torrey Pines Scenic Dr.	8/26/1992	Glider airport established in 1928 and used by aviation pioneers including Charles A. Lindbergh and Woodly Brown; U.S. Army cadets trained here during WWII
317	Easton-Mertz House		1525 Torrey Pines Road	4/28/93	House built from 1910–1911, designed by Emmor Brooke Weaver; designation rescinded in 1995 to allow house to be moved to Poway
324	Bentham Hall at The Bishop's School		7607 La Jolla Blvd	7/27/1994	Structure at The Bishop's School built in 1910, designed by Irving Gill with assistance from Louis Gill
327	Darlington House		7441 Olivetas Avenue	7/26/1995	Mediterranean style house built in 1925, associated with architects Herbert Palmer, Richard Requa and Thomas Shepherd
347	Prospect View/Redwood Hollow		244-254 Prospect Street	9/24/1997	Example of La Jolla bungalow cottage court vacation retreat
353	The Bishop's School		7607 La Jolla Blvd	2/15/1998	Designated elements include Scripps Hall (Irving Gill, 1910–11), Gilman Hall (Irving Gill and Louis Gill, 1916), St. Mary's Chapel (Carleton Winslow, 1916), The Tower (Carleton Winslow, 1930), Wheeler J. Bailey Library (Carleton Winslow, 1935), garden sall on Prospect St. and La Jolla Blvd.
357	The Bishop's School Historic District		7607 La Jolla Blvd	5/27/1998	Designated structures include Bentham Hall (Irving Gill, 1910), Scripps Hall (Irving Gill, 1910–11), Gilman Hall (Irving Gill and Louis Gill, 1916), St. Mary's Chapel (Carleton Winslow, 1916), The Tower (Carleton Winslow, 1930), Wheeler J. Bailey Library (Carleton Winslow, 1935), Garden Wall on Prospect St., and Trees planted before 1935
357	Surf Shack at Windansea Beach		6800 Neptune Place	5/27/1998	Palm shelter built in 1947 by surfers returning from WWII; oldest continuously used shelter of its kind on West Coast
364	Geranium Cottage		830 Kline Street	8/26/1998	Craftsman style cottage built in 1904 for Dr. and Mrs. Edward Howard; originally located at 503 Prospect St. and moved in 1914
368	Oxley House		9302 La Jolla Farms Road	9/23/1998	California Modern style house built in 1958, designed by Richard Neutra; one of only two Neutra houses in San Diego
375	Dr. Martha Dunn Corey Residence		494 Arenas St.	3/24/1999	Victorian house built in 1909 for Dr. Martha Dunn Corey, moved from 7520 Draper Ave in 2003
380	Cave Store & Professor Shultz' Tunnel Leading to the Sunny Jim Cave		1325 Cave Street	4/28/1999	Vernacular commercial structure built 1902-1912 by Prof. Gustav Schultz; remodeled to current appearance in 1920s by Josephine Seaman
386	Carey Crest-El Paradon Seacliffe House		1369 Coast Walk	7/22/1999	Structure built 1900-1901
390	Spindrift archaeological site		1900 Spindrift Drive	9/23/1999	Archeological site known as the Spindthrift site; site of settlement by San Dieguito Native Americans; contains finds dating from 965-1645 A.D.
396	Gordon-Hooper archeological site		2504 Ellentown Road	10/28/1999	Archeological site first identified in the 1930s and located on Scripps Estate site
413	Kenyon Residence		750 Bonair Place	4/27/2000	Architectural application of adobe brick construction in modern style; appeal to City Council overturned designation in June 2000
416	Violetta Horton Speculation House #1		7445 Hillside Drive	4/27/2000	Ranch style house built in 1935, designed by architect Clifford May
417	Violetta Horton Speculation House #2		7447 Hillside Drive	4/27/2000	Ranch style house built in 1935, designed by architect Clifford May
431	Grace Scripps Johanson		1540 Virginia Way	7/27/2000	Colonial Revival style house built in 1937, designed by architect William Field Staunton, Jr.
432	Judkins/J.L. Wright House		1700 Torrey Pines Road	8/24/2000	Modern style house built in 1946, designed by John Lloyd Wright
433	Devanney Residence		1341 Park Row	9/28/2000	American Craftsman style house built c. 1905
447	La Jolla Reading Room		7590 Draper Avenue	10/26/2000	Folk Victorian structure built in 1898; originally located at NE corner of Girard Ave. and Wall St.
449	Dolly's House		7857 Eads Avenue	10/26/2000	Spanish Revival house built in 1930
463	LaCrosse House		1261-1263 Cave Street	4/26/2001	Victorian Stick and American Craftsman style house built in 1900
473	Scripps Estates archeological site		2484 Ellentown Rd.	7/26/2001	Archeological site with prehistoric significance for burials and artifacts
480	Smith-Sirigo House		6309 Hartley Drive	8/3/2001	Spanish eclectic style house built in 1937
498	Erling Rhode Residence		7245 Eads Ave.	10/25/2001	Craftsman cottage built in 1912
502	Adams Residence-La Canada		754 La Canada	10/25/2001	Spanish Colonial Revival house built in 1929
503	Fuelscher House		7300-7304 Eads Avenue	10/25/2001	Monterey eclectic style house built in 1929
508	Fleet-Rice-Hoyt House		7667 Pepita Way	12/20/2001	Monterey style house built 1936–1937, designed by architect Lilian Jenette Rice
514	Mabel Scruggs/Thomas L. Shepherd House		7055 Vista Del Mar	4/25/2002	Ranch style house built in 1940, designed by architect Thomas Shepherd
520	Casa de la Paz-The Dunes		325-333 Dunemere Drive	5/23/2002	Spanish eclectic style house built in 1922
521	A.W. Woods House		1917 Soledad Avenue	5/23/2002	Craftsman bungalow built in 1913
528	Dr. Harold C. & Frieda Daum Urey/Russell Forester House		7890 Torrey Lane	7/25/2002	California Ranch style house built in 1954, designed by architect Russell Forester
542	Elizabeth Starr House		7115 Olivetas Ave.	9/26/2002	Tudor Revival house built in 1928
545	Col. John Wretts & Helen Cecilia Hannay House		1414 Virginia Way	9/26/2002	Folk Victorian style house with Craftsman and Colonial Revival influences; built in 1907
552	Harry Okey House		5732 Bellevue Avenue	10/24/2002	Spanish eclectic house built in 1929
560	Henry and May Turner/Herbert Mann-Thomas Shepherd House		391 Via del Norte	11/22/2002	Spanish eclectic house built in 1928, designed by architects Herbert J. Mann and Thomas Shepherd
570	William T. MacDonald/Richard Requa House		7374 Romero Dr.	2/27/2003	Spanish eclectic house built in 1933, designed by architect Richard Requa
587	Mittie Churcher House		1265 Park Row	5/22/2003	English cottage variant of Tudor Revival home built in 1922
596	Carlos Tavares/Herbert Mann House		6425 Muirlands Dr.	6/26/2003	Spanish eclectic house built c. 1931
615	Richard Olney/Sim Bruce Richards House		1644 Crespo Dr.	9/25/2003	Modern house built in 1954
622	James and Caroline Whittlesey/Robert Farquhar House		7728 Lookout Dr.	9/25/2003	French eclectic house built in 1937
624	Esther Morrison House		715 La Canada	9/25/2003	Spanish eclectic Monterey style house built in 1928
630	Katharine Smith/Thomas Shepherd House		6019 Avenida Cresta	10/23/2003	French eclectic house with Mediterranean influences built in 1929
638	Spindthrift archeological site #2		1876 Torrey Pines Rd.	11/21/2003	Archeological site
639	Myrtle Parker Swain House		247 Westbourne St.	11/21/2003	Spanish eclectic style house built in 1929
678	Williams Scripps Kellogg House		7865 El Paseo Grande	8/26/2004	Ranch house built in 1938
679	Violetta Horton/Cliff May Spec House #3		7477 Hillside Dr.	8/26/2004	Ranch house built in 1935, designed by architect Cliff May
688	R. W. Gillespie House		6425 Electric Ave.	9/23/2004	Spanish eclectic style house built in 1929
689	Lester Palmer/Herbert Mann & Thomas Shepherd House		6751 Muirlands Dr.	9/23/2004	Spanish eclectic style house built in 1927, designed by architects Herbert Mann and Thomas Shepherd
692	Florence Palmer House		360 Fern Glen	10/28/2004	English cottage built in 1929 (National Register eligible)
693	George and Ruth Glendon/Edgar Ullrich House		1006 Muirlands Dr.	10/28/2004	Spanish eclectic style house built in 1928, designed by architect Edgar Ullrich
702	Mansfield and Katherine Mills House		7105 Country Club Dr.	3/24/2005	Modern style house built in 1958, designed by architect Dale Naegle
708	F.M. Sheppard Duplex and House Rentals		1046, 1049-1051 Coast Blvd.	4/28/2005	Craftsman, shingle-style structures built in 1911
710	Lowry McClanahan/Thomas Shepherd House		7716 Lookout Dr.	5/26/2005	Colonial Revival house built in 1937, designed by architect Thomas Shepherd
731	Violetta Lee Horton Spec House #4		7575 Hillside Dr.	9/22/2005	One-story modern hacienda house built in 1935, designed by architect Clifford May
740	Edgar Ullrich House		1745 Kearsarge Rd.	1/26/2006	Tudor Revival style house built in 1925, designed by architect Edgar Ullrich
757	Louise and Thomas Rothwell/Thomas Shepherd House		7811 Hillside Dr.	6/22/2006	Spanish eclectic house built in 1927, designed by Thomas Shepherd
759	Uriah and Clara Barkey House		8265 Paseo del Ocaso	6/22/2006	Spanish eclectic house built in 1929, one of the Seven Sisters
763	Ada Black/Herbert Mann and Thomas Shepherd House		7781 Hillside Dr.	7/27/2006	Spanish eclectic house built in 1927, designed by Herbert Mann and Thomas Shepherd
767	F. Lisle Morgan Spec House #1		7144 Monte Vista Ave.	7/27/2006	Spanish eclectic house built in 1930
768	Frank and Gloria Compton/John Lloyd Wright House		7840 E. Roseland Dr.	8/24/2006	Modern style house built in 1948, designed by John Lloyd Wright
782	Wheeler Bailey/Irving Gill House		7964 Princess St.	9/28/2006	Craftsman and International style house built in 1907, designed by Irving Gill
805	Howard and Maude Brown House		7126 Monte Vista Ave.	3/22/2007	Spanish eclectic house built in 1929
812	Marie Louise Biggar/Herbert J. Mann House		409 Dunemere Dr.	4/26/2007	Pueblo Revival style house built in 1923, remodeled in 1931; designed by architect Herbert J. Mann
813	Spindthrift archeological site #3		1905 Spindthrift Dr.	5/24/2007	
818	Hazel Weir/Dennstedt Company House/Spindthrift archeological site #4		1857 Viking Way	6/28/2007	Spanish eclectic Monterey style house built in 1935
827	Harold and Charlotte Muir House		1205 Muirlands Dr.	7/26/2007	Spanish eclectic house built in 1928, designed by Edgar Ullrich
829	Philip Barber/Herbert Mann and Thomas Shepherd Spec House #1		359 Sea Lane	8/23/2007	Tudor Revival style house built in 1928, designed by architects Thomas Shepherd and Herbert Mann
830	Charles D. and Laura K. Larkins House		347 Dunemere Dr.	8/23/2007	Colonial house with Spanish influences built in 1931
833	Karsten and Susan Joehnk/Thomas Shepherd House		6101 Avenida Cresta	8/23/2007	Spanish eclectic house built in 1928 designed by Edgar Ullrich; remodeled in 1979 with design by Thomas Shepherd
842	Leon Beatty Spec House #1		307 La Canada	11/8/2007	Ranch house with French Revival influences built in 1949
849	Cassius & Kate Peck/Thomas Shepherd House		620 Via Del Norte	11/29/2007	Ranch minimal traditional house built in 1948; designed by Thomas Shepherd
854	Clyde and Arabelle Hufbauer House		1821 Torrey Pines Rd.	1/24/2008	Post-and-beam modern house built in 1952
858	Casa Del Horizonte		7417-7427 Olivetas Ave.	3/27/2008	Contemporary style bungalow built in 1947
866	H.R. and Olga McClintock/Herbert Palmer and Milton Sessions House		7755 Sierra Mar Dr.	5/22/2008	Spanish eclectic style house built in 1927; designed by Herbert Palmer
878	Marguerite Robinson/Lilian Jenette Rice House		1600 Ludington Lane; 32°50′52″N 117°15′53″W	7/24/2008	Colonial Revival style house built 1929, designed by architect Lilian J. Rice
881	Ralph Loren and Alice Mae Frank House		6003 Waverly Ave. 32°49′16″N 117°16′14″W	8/28/2008	Spanish Eclectic style house built 1928, designed by Ralph L. Frank
882	James J. Podesta House		6123 Avenida Cresta; 32°49′18″N 117°16′32″W	8/28/2008	Italian Renaissance style house built in 1927, designed by architect Edgar Ullrich
892	Jean P. Hampton/A.L. & A.E. Dennstedt Building Company Spec House		7015 Vista del Mar Ave. 32°49′57″N 117°16′47″W	12/21/2008	Spanish Colonial Revival house built 1935
898	Minnie Gerhard/Thomas Shepherd House		7118 Olivetas Ave. 32°50′03″N 117°16′42″W	2/26/2009	French Eclectic style house built 1934, designed by architect Thomas Shepherd
902	Walt Mason House		1411 Virginia Way; 32°50′43″N 117°16′02″W	3/26/2009	California Bungalow built 1912
915	La Jolla Adult Recreation Center Club		1160 Coast Blvd; 32°51′02″N 117°16′25″W	8/28/2008	Modern ranch clubhouse built 1939, designed by architect Richard Requa
927	William and Anna Bradley/Lilian Rice House		7325 Remley Place; 32°50′29″N 117°15′39″W	8/27/2009	Tudor Revival style house built 1930, designed by architect Lilian J. Rice
941	James A. Wilson Spec House #1		1263 Silverado St. 32°50′49″N 117°16′12″W	11/20/2009	Craftsman Bungalow built 1909
956	Edward and Eleanor Mastin House		1891 Viking Way; 32°51′02″N 117°15′39″W	4/22/2010	Spanish Eclectic style house built 1930, designed by architect Edgar V. Ullrich
965	Norman Kennedy House		716 La Canada; 32°49′17″N 117°16′13″W	8/26/2010	Tudor Revival style house built 1928, designer Edgar V. Ullrich. Associated with artist Norman Kennedy
992	Park Prospect Condominiums/Russell Forester Building		800 Prospect St. 32°50′44″N 117°16′36″W	4/28/2011	International Modernist style condominiums built 1963, designed by architect Russell Forester
993	Lisbon and Margaret Durham/Thomas Shepherd House		364 Via Del Norte; 32°49′24″N 117°16′36″W	4/28/2011	California Ranch style house built 1948, designed by architect Thomas L. Shepherd
1000	Parker and Dorothy Seitz/Thomas Shepherd House		7123 Olivetas Ave; 32°50′04″N 117°16′41″W	6/22/2011	Colonial Revival style house built 1933, designed by architect Thomas Shepherd
1007	John K. and Judith B. Wells Spec House #1		6758 Muirlands Dr. 32°49′58″N 117°15′48″W	8/26/2010	French Eclectic style house built 1928
1013	Tillie Genter House		7356 Eads Ave. 32°50′17″N 117°16′28″W	7/28/2011	Craftsman bungalow, built 1927.
1023	Margaret Rice Robertson House		7712 Hillside Dr. 32°50′51″N 117°15′36″W	10/27/2011	Tudor Revival style house built 1931.
1024	Alfred and Jessica Phinney/Thomas L. Shepherd House		7124 Olivetas Ave. 32°50′04″N 117°16′42″W	10/27/2011	French Eclectic Revival style house built 1962, designed by architect Thomas L. Shepherd
1025	The Life House		6025 Waverly Ave; 32°49′18″N 117°16′16″W	10/27/2011	Minimal Traditional house built 1939, designed by Benjamin M. Torgerson. Reflective of the Small House Movement, a LIFE magazine program.
1052	Dr. Frank Dixon House		2355 Avenida De La Playa; 32°52′37″N 117°14′45″W	5/24/2012	Custom Ranch built in 1953 by architect David C. Tatman. Designated under HRB Criterion B for association with Dr. Frank Dixon and Criterion C as a Custom Ranch with modern post and beam influences.
1054	Jacob Bronowski House		9438 La Jolla Farms Rd. 32°51′13″N 117°15′06″W	6/28/2012	Historically significant under Criterion B due to association with Jacob Bronowski.
1055	James and Evangeline Walker House		7450 High Ave. 32°50′27″N 117°16′13″W	6/28/2012	French Eclectic style house built 1940.
1062	Lillian Lentell Cottages		817 Silverado St. 32°50′40″N 117°16′33″W	7/26/2012	Early beach cottage built 1913, moved from its original location at 7762 Bishops Lane in 2021
1064	Helen Ruth Dailey/Russell Forester House		7750 Ludington Pl. 32°50′50″N 117°15′52″W	7/26/2012	Custom Ranch style house built 1948, designed by architect Russell Forester
1062	Lillian Lentell Cottages		7761 Eads Ave. 32°50′39″N 117°16′33″W	7/26/2012	Early beach cottage, built ca. 1913-1915
1067	Casa De Las Joyas		7902 Roseland Dr. 32°51′01″N 117°15′25″W	9/27/2012	Indian Vernacular house with Spanish Eclectic influences built in 1927-1932, designed by Herbert Palmer. Known as “The Taj Mahal of La Jolla”
1070	Paul and Charlotte Hutchinson House		1856 Viking Way; 32°51′02″N 117°15′43″W	9/27/2012	Spanish Eclectic style house built 1931
1074	Eden and Ada George House		524 Coast South Blvd. 32°50′36″N 117°16′47″W	10/25/2012	Beach cottage built 1923, designed by Ernest Eden George.
1091	Dr. Anita Figueredo Buildings		417 Coast Blvd. 32°50′34″N 117°16′50″W	11/29/2012	Monterey style house built 1925, architect unknown. Designated under Criterion B for its association with Dr. Anita Figueredo, San Diego’s first female surgeon and under Criterion C for its distinctive architectural characteristics.
1091	Dr. Anita Figueredo Buildings		418-420 Coast Blvd. 32°50′33″N 117°16′51″W	11/29/2012	Spanish Eclectic style residences built 1932, architect unknown. Designated under Criterion B for its association with Dr. Anita Figueredo, San Diego’s first female surgeon and under Criterion C for its distinctive architectural characteristics.
1103	La Jolla Post Office		1140 Wall St. 32°50′51″N 117°16′20″W	6/27/2013	Spanish Colonial Revival structure built 1935; public lobby mural, Scenic View of the Village (1935–36) painted by Belle Baranceanu.
1105	Russell and Rosemary Lanthorne/Homer Delawie House		7520 Mar Ave. 32°50′33″N 117°16′05″W	6/27/2013	Post-and-Beam style built in 1963, designed by architect Homer Delawie
1126	Ruby Snell Cottage		341 Playa Del Sur; 32°49′46″N 117°16′41″W	1/23/2014	Reflects early historical and architectural development of the Windansea neighborhood
1140	George and Virginia Hayes/Edgar Ullrich House		5905 Camino De La Costa; 32°49′08″N 117°16′23″W	5/22/2014	French Eclectic style house built 1933-34, designed by architect Edgar Ullrich
1142	Frank and Adelaide Krapp House		7025 Vista Del Mar; 32°49′57″N 117°16′48″W	6/26/2014	Minimal Traditional style house with Colonial Revival influences built 1936
1144	Walter and Louise Trible/Thomas Shepherd House		6028 Folsome Dr. 32°49′19″N 117°16′11″W	6/26/2014	Monterey Revival style house built 1929, designed by architect Thomas Shepherd
1145	The Stafford Cottage		7415 Fay Ave. 32°50′21″N 117°16′21″W	6/26/2014	Craftsman Bungalow, built 1915.
1149	Josephine Seaman Rental Cottage		1327 Coast Walk; 32°50′36″N 117°16′47″W	7/31/2014	Craftsman bungalow built 1921 as a rental cottage built by Josephine Seaman around the Carey Crest/El Paradon house
1154	James and Doris Byerly/Russell Forester House		1949 Paseo Dorado. 32°51′09″N 117°15′17″W	8/28/2014	Modernist house built 1968, designed by architect Russell Forester
1155	Cornelia Fairbrother House		7224 Fay Ave. 32°50′12″N 117°16′22″W	9/25/2014	Spanish Eclectic house built 1929
1155	John Meed Ray Cottage		7224 1/2 Fay Ave. 32°50′12″N 117°16′22″W	9/25/2014	Beach cottage built 1918.
1170	William and Wilma Garth/Edgar Ullrich House		1825 Castellana Rd. 32°50′46″N 117°15′34″W	12/04/2014	Spanish Eclectic house built 1928, designed by architect Edgar Ullrich
1174	Manzanita Cottage		7991 Prospect Pl. 32°50′55″N 117°16′12″W	2/26/2015	Beach Cottage style house built 1910
1188	Florence Palmer Spec House #1		350 Fern Lane; 32°50′02″N 117°16′46″W	8/27/2015	Tudor Revival house built 1929, designed by Florence Palmer
1218	Louis Buray Spec House #1		552 Rushville St. 32°50′06″N 117°16′34″W	5/26/2016	Spanish Eclectic style house built 1928
1228	Jackson Johnson III/Lloyd Ruocco and Homer Delawie House		8272 El Paseo Grande; 32°51′24″N 117°15′20″W	7/28/2016	Modern Contemporary style house built 1961, designed by Lloyd Ruocco and Homer Delawie
1246	Michael and Clara Brown House		5645 Taft Ave; 32°48′57″N 117°15′54″W	3/23/2017	Post-and-Beam style house with Organic Geometric influences built in 1968, designed by Richard Lareau
1257	Helen Copley House		1263 Virginia Way; 32°50′37″N 117°16′09″W	5/25/2017	Tudor Revival style house built 1927, designated for its association with publisher and philanthropist Helen K. Copley
1257	Charlotte Gary Barnum House		5805 Camino de la Costa; 32°49′04″N 117°16′33″W	6/22/2017	Spanish Eclectic house built in 1927, architect unknown. Designated under Criterion A as a distinctive community structure marking the south entrance to the La Jolla Lower Hermosa subdivision development.
1265	Herbert and Alexina Childs/Thomas L. Shepherd House		210 Westbourne St. 32°49′56″N 117°16′51″W	8/24/2017	French Eclectic style house with Georgian influences, built 1950-1971, designed by architect Thomas Shepherd
1270	Anna Vickers House		1419 Virginia Way; 32°50′44″N 117°16′01″W	9/28/2017	Tudor Revival style house built 1928
1295	Anna Dyblie Spec House #1		7747 Ivanhoe Avenue East; 32°50′43″N 117°16′15″W	4/26/2018	Spanish Colonial Revival house built in 1928.
1296	Thomas Shepherd House		345 Via Del Norte; 32°49′21″N 117°16′36″W	4/26/2018	Italian Renaissance Revival house built 1940, designed by architect Thomas Shepherd
1297	Robert and Alma Lard/Homer Delawie and Lloyd Ruocco House		2218 Vallecitos; 32°51′20″N 117°15′18″W	4/26/2018	Contemporary (Modernist) style house built 1965, architects Homer Delawie and Lloyd Ruocco
1300	Abbe Wolfsheimer-Stutz House		6200 Avenida Cresta; 32°49′17″N 117°16′41″W	5/23/2019	Custom Ranch built in 1937 by architect Thomas Shepherd. Designated under HRB Criterion B for association with Abbe Wolfsheimer-Stutz who played a visionary leadership role in the establishment of the San Dieguito River Park, among other important projects.
1336	Virginia Nuckolls/Cliff May House		6004 Avenida Cresta; 32°49′12″N 117°16′32″W	5/23/2019	Spanish Colonial Revival built in 1936 by architect Cliff May
1340	Ruth Smith and Louise Neece/Lloyd Ruocco and Homer Delawie Duplex		8015-8017 El Paseo Grande; 32°51′10″N 117°15′19″W	6/27/2019	Contemporary duplex built 1960, designed by Lloyd Ruocco and Homer Delawie
1359	Margarette Meyers/William Lumpkins House		9565 La Jolla Farms Rd. 32°52′50″N 117°14′46″W	2/27/2020	Custom Ranch house built 1961, designed by architect William Lumpkins
1366	Rev. Nassau and Estelle Stephens/Thomas Shepherd House		1802 Amalfi St. 32°50′55″N 117°15′44″W	6/25/2020	Spanish Eclectic style house built in 1931, designed by architect Thomas Shepherd
1370	Lt. Cdr. Donald and Maj Joyce Schmock/Sim Bruce Richards House		7345 Remley Pl. 32°50′30″N 117°15′40″W	6/25/2020	Organic Geometric style house built 1952, designed by architect Sim Bruce Richards
1371	Max and Louise Gross/Russell Forester House		5911 Folsom Dr. 32°49′13″N 117°16′04″W	7/23/2020	Post-and-Beam house built 1962, designed by architect Russell Forester
1372	Louis and Frances Stroud/Thomas Shepherd Residence		211 Avenida Cortez; 32°49′19″N 117°16′38″W	6/25/2020	Custom Ranch house built in 1948, designed by architect Thomas L. Shepherd
1373	Col. O.H.B. and Gladys Trenchard/Cliff May House		6126 Avenida Cresta; 32°49′17″N 117°16′39″W	7/23/2020	Spanish Eclectic style house built in 1935, designed by architect Cliff May
1375	Dorothy and Harriet Cottages		825-827 Coast South Blvd. 32°50′46″N 117°16′38″W	8/27/2020	Queen Anne style beach cottage, built 1904, designated with a period of significance 1904-1909 and 1921-1926 under Criterion A.
1388	Florence Palmer Spec House #2		7154 Olivetas Ave. 32°50′06″N 117°16′42″W	10/29/2020	Tudor Revival style house built 1927, designed by Florence Palmer
1390	Helen Copley/Henry Hester House		7923 Prospect Place; 32°50′54″N 117°16′06″W	10/29/2020	Mansard style house built 1987, designed by architect Henry Hester
1391	Frederick and Marianne Liebhardt House		7224 Carrizo Dr. 32°50′22″N 117°15′34″W	10/29/2020	Organic Geometric house built 1951, designed by Frederick Liebhardt
1400	Julia Goodell House		7112 Monte Vista Ave. 32°50′03″N 117°16′45″W	1/28/2021	Spanish Eclectic style house built 1924
1401	Dorrit and Albert Wright House		8445 Avenida De Las Ondas; 32°51′40″N 117°15′04″W	1/28/2001	Post and Beam style house built in 1955, designed by architect Theodore Paulson
1414	Webb Van Horn Rose/Charles Salyers House		736 Fern Glen; 32°50′06″N 117°16′26″W	4/22/2021	Tudor Revival style house built 1932, designed by architect Charles Salyers
1425	Robert and Rebecca Liebner/William Ivans House		807 La Jolla Rancho Rd. 32°49′08″N 117°15′59″W	7/22/2021	Contemporary style home built in 1961, formerly owned by glider pilot William Ivans. Unique structural system supports house as it cantilevers 58 feet off of a canyon rim.
1428	The Prospect Center Building		1020 Prospect St. 32°50′53″N 117°16′28″W	7/22/2021	Brutalist-influenced building built 1966, designed by architects Ladd and Kelsey
1440	Edgar V. Ullrich House #2		6001 Bellevue Place; 32°49′17″N 117°16′10″W	10/28/2021	Custom house incorporating several different architectural styles, built in 1928, designed by architect Edgar Ullrich.
1446	William and Virginia Calloway/Sim Bruce Richards House		10 East Roseland Dr. 32°50′56″N 117°15′15″W	1/27/2022	Contemporary style house built in 1967, designed by architect Sim Bruce Richards
1454	Ervin and Ethel Jesse House		7402 Eads Ave. 32°50′19″N 117°16′28″W	5/26/2022	Minimal Traditional house built 1938
1458	Ellis and Nancy Barron House		6632 Avenida Manana; 32°49′48″N 117°16′02″W	6/23/2022	Contemporary (modernist) house built 1959, designed by Henry Hester
1459	Mary Lynch/Frank Hope, Sr., House		1320 Park Row; 32°50′44″N 117°16′12″W	6/23/2022	Monterey Revival style house built 1933, designed by architect Frank Hope, Sr.
1467	Arklow Cottage		7425 Faye Ave. 32°50′21″N 117°16′23″W	9/22/2022	Craftsman (Arts & Crafts) cottage, built 1923.
1477	Joseph and Elizabeth Yamada/Joseph Yamada House		1676 El Camino Del Teatro; 32°49′46″N 117°15′27″W	11/17/2022	Shed style house, built 1973, with a Japanese strolling garden style of landscape architecture. The Yamadas were sold the land in 1967, a year before the Fair Housing Act of 1968, when an unspoken agreement still excluded Black, Jewish, and Asian American families from owning property in the area.
1478	MacPherson and Theodora Hole Rental House		7109 Monte Vista Ave. 32°50′03″N 117°16′43″W	11/17/2022	Monterey Revival Style house built 1930
1481	The Herbert York/Herbert Palmer House/La Casa de Los Amigos		6110 Camino de la Costa; 32°49′14″N 117°16′41″W	1/26/2023	Spanish Colonial Revival house built 1924, designed by Herbert Palmer. The oldest intact residential structure in La Jolla Hermosa, it is identified with nuclear physicist Herbert York.
1490	Lloyd and Raymona Swortwood Speculation House		7390 Via Capri; 32°50′39″N 117°15′10″W	3/23/2023	Contemporary (Modernist) style house built in 1961-62, designed by architects Roger Matthews and Russell Forester
1494	Jerome and Joyce Shaw/Lloyd Ruocco House		7245 Rue de Roark; 32°50′35″N 117°15′03″W	6/22/2023	Organic Geometric style house built 1966, designed by architect Lloyd Ruocco
1501	Helmhurst Cottage		1570 Virginia Way; 32°50′52″N 117°15′56″W	7/27/2023	Craftsman (Arts & Crafts) style house built 1911
1511	Dr. Paul A. Libby/Lloyd Ruocco House		7846 Esterel Dr. 32°51′00″N 117°14′44″W	10/26/2023	Contemporary (Modernist) house built 1967, designed by architect Lloyd Ruocco
1546	John and Mary Elizabeth Lambert Spec House #1		7964 Roseland Dr; 32°51′04″N 117°15′33″W	02/27/2025	Spanish Colonial Revival built 1929, architect John W. Gernandt
1530	Nina Bowden/Robert Mosher and Roy Drew House		7960 La Jota Way; 32°51′04″N 117°15′37″W	07/25/2024	Custom Ranch built 1952, designed by architects Robert Mosher and Roy Drew
1548	Drs. Elsa and George Feher/Frederick Liebhardt/Joseph Yamada House		2710 Bordeaux Ave; 32°51′55″N 117°14′44″W	03/27/2025	Contemporary Post-and-Beam style house built 1967, designed by architect Frederick Liebhardt with landscape by Joseph Yamada
1549	Helen Copley/Henry Hester House #2		7934 Prospect Pl; 32°50′52″N 117°16′8″W	03/27/2025	Post-Modern house, 1987, architect Henry Hester

== See also ==
- National Register of Historic Places listings in San Diego County
- List of San Diego Historic Landmarks in the Point Loma and Ocean Beach areas
- List of San Diego Historic Landmarks (1-150)
