= Cuyamaca complex =

Archeological site in San Diego County, California

The Cuyamaca complex is a precolumbian complex, dating from the late Holocene, with archaeological sites in San Diego County, California. This complex is related to the Kumeyaay peoples.

This archaeological pattern was defined by Delbert L. True in the 1960s, on the basis of late prehistoric evidence from the territory of the Kumeyaay people, primarily in Cuyamaca Rancho State Park. Hual-Cu-Cuish (SDI-860) is another Cuyamaca complex site.

This complex is in part synonymous with the Yuman III pattern proposed by Malcolm J. Rogers and the Patayan Complex that is primarily associated with the Colorado Desert to the east.

The interpretation of the Cuyamaca Complex was elaborated primarily in contrast with the San Luis Rey Complex, which existed contemporaneously in the Palomar Mountain area of northern San Diego County, within Luiseño territory. Elements that set the Cuyamaca Complex apart from the San Luis Rey Complex, according to True, include:

- defined cemetery areas apart from living areas
- use of grave markers
- cremated human remains placed in urns
- use of specially made mortuary offerings such as miniature vessels, miniature arrow-shaft straighteners, and elaborate projectile points
- preference for side-notched Desert and Cottonwood projectile points
- substantial numbers of scraping tools
- emphasis on use of Tizon and Lower Colorado ceramics
- steatite industry
- substantially higher frequency of milling stone tools
- clay-lined hearths
