= Scripps Building =

Scripps Building can mean:

- Old Scripps Building, in La Jolla, California
- Scripps Center, in Cincinnati, Ohio
