= Melissa Winter =

American Democratic political aide

- Born: November 16, 1967 (age 58); Chicago, Illinois, U.S.
- Education: Skidmore College
- Political party: Democratic

Melissa "Mel" Winter (born November 16, 1967) is an American Democratic political aide who served as a senior advisor to First Lady Michelle Obama throughout the presidency of Barack Obama.

Since leaving the White House, Winter continues to serve as Obama's personal chief of staff.

== Early life ==
Winter was born in Chicago. Her family later moved to La Jolla, California, where she attended The Bishop's School, graduating in 1985.

== Biography ==
After graduating from Skidmore College, Winter moved to Washington, D.C., and began an 18-year career on Capitol Hill. She worked for then-Congressman Norman Mineta for seven years as a staff assistant and executive assistant before joining the staff of Senator Joe Lieberman. Winter was Senator Lieberman's traveling aide during his time as the Democratic candidate for vice president in the 2000 election. She later served as director of scheduling for Lieberman's 2004 presidential campaign.

In 2007, Winter was Mrs. Obama's first hire on the Obama presidential campaign. She served as her close aide throughout the 2008 campaign. After the election, Winter was appointed deputy chief of staff to the First Lady, and was later promoted to senior advisor to the First Lady.
