= Great Plains Distinguished Book Prize =

Literary award

The Stubbendieck Great Plains Distinguished Book Prize (formerly the Great Plains Distinguished Book Prize) is an annual literary award awarded by the University of Nebraska–Lincoln to the previous year's best non-fiction book on the Great Plains. Eligible books must be full-length, first editions in English, published or copyrighted within the previous year. The prize was established in 2005 and includes a $10,000 cash award.

Prior to 2012, when no award was presented, the prize was given according to the publication year of the book. Since 2012, awards have been named according to the year the award was presented.

== List of winners ==
| Year | Title | Author | Location |
|---|---|---|---|
| 2005 | Buffalo Bill's America: William Cody and the Wild West Show | Louis S. Warren | University of California, Davis |
| 2006 | Indians and Emigrants: Encounters on the Overland Trail | Michael L. Tate | University of Nebraska Omaha |
| 2007 | Ruling Pine Ridge: Oglala Lakota Politics from the IRA to Wounded Knee | Akim Reinhardt | Towson University |
| 2008 | The Comanche Empire | Pekka Hämäläinen | University of California, Santa Barbara |
| 2009 | Great Plains: America's Lingering Wild | Michael Forsberg | Lincoln, Nebraska |
| 2010 | Hancock's War: Conflict on the Southern Plains | William Y. Chalfant | Hutchinson, Kansas |
| 2011 | The Northern Cheyenne Exodus in History and Memory | James N. Leiker; Ramon Powers | Overland Park, Kansas |
| 2012 | Award not presented | | |
| 2013 | Blackfoot Redemption: A Blood Indian's Story of Murder, Confinement, and Imperfect Justice | William E. Farr | University of Montana |
| 2014 | Architecture of Saskatchewan: A Visual Journey, 1930-2011 | Bernard Flaman | Saskatchewan, Canada |
| 2015 | Encounters at the Heart of the World: A History of the Mandan People | Elizabeth A. Fenn | University of Colorado Boulder |
| 2016 | Métis and the Medicine Line: Creating a Border and Dividing a People | Michel Hogue | Carleton University |
| 2017 | American Serengeti: The Last Big Animals of the Great Plains | Dan Flores | University of Montana |
| 2018 | This Blessed Earth: A Year in the Life of an American Family Farm | Ted Genoways | Lincoln, Nebraska |
| 2019 | No Place Like Home: Lessons in Activism from LGBT Kansas | C.J. Janovy | University of Kansas |
| 2020 | Lakota America: A New History of Indigenous Power | Pekka Hämäläinen | University of Oxford |
| 2021 | A Sacred People: Indigenous Governance, Traditional Leadership, and the Warriors of the Cheyenne Nation; A Sovereign People: Indigenous Nationhood, Traditional Law, and the Covenants of the Cheyenne Nation | Leo Killsback | Montana State University |
| 2022 | I've Been Here All the While: Black Freedom on Native Land | Alaina Roberts | University of Pittsburgh |
| 2023 | Valley of the Birdtail: An Indian Reserve, a White Town, and the Road to Reconciliation | Douglas Sanderson; Andrew Stobo Sniderman | University of Toronto |
| 2024 | Birding While Indian: A Mixed-Blood Memoir | Thomas C. Gannon | University of Nebraska–Lincoln |
| 2025 | By the Fire We Carry: The Generations-Long Fight for Justice on Native Land | Rebecca Nagle | |
