= James Ronald Warren =

- Born: James Ronald Chappelle; May 25, 1925; Goldendale, Washington, U.S.
- Died: September 13, 2012 (aged 87); Seattle, Washington, U.S.
- Education: University of Washington
- Occupation: Historian
- Employer: Museum of History and Industry
- Known for: Rediscovering the source of the Seattle fire of 1889.
- Title: Emeritus Director
- Spouse: Gwen Davis Warren

James Ronald Warren (May 25, 1925 – September 13, 2012) was a Seattle historian instrumental in rediscovering the source of the Seattle fire of 1889. He also fought as a member of the 242nd Infantry Regiment of the 42nd Infantry "Rainbow" Division at the Battle of the Bulge and was a German POW.

He was an emeritus director of the Museum of History and Industry in Seattle, Washington.

== Early life ==
Born in Goldendale, Washington, on May 25, 1925, to Mr. Chappelle and Dorthy Hope Rodgers Chappelle. Mr. Chappelle died when James was a baby. His mother remarried Hubert Samuel Warren from whom he took his last name. James is the half brother of archeologist Claude Nelson Warren.

He attended Goldendale Jr. High School in Goldendale, Washington, and graduated from Wishram High School in Wishram, Washington in 1943 and was drafted shortly thereafter.

== War Years ==
Warren attended boot camp near Twentynine Palms, California as well as Camp Gruber, Oklahoma. He was training for deployment in North Africa but was deployed to Northern France where his Division participated in the Battle of the Bulge where he was captured. His regiment was awarded the Presidential Unit Citation. Warren received the Bronze Star Medal and a Purple Heart for his participation in the battle.

Following his liberation from a German POW camp he returned to the US to recuperate and was preparing to deploy into the Pacific Theatre when the war ended.

== University Years ==
Warren returned home from World War II in 1945. He began attending Washington State University in 1946 where he earned his bachelor's degree in Public Speaking. It was there that he met his future wife Gwen Davis. Warren worked a year for a radio station in Bend, Oregon. He began attending the University of Washington where he earned a master's degree in Communications. In 1963 Warren earned a Ph.D. in history from the University of Washington

== Professional life ==
Between 1963 and 1970 Warren worked as a classical music radio host in the Seattle area.

He was the president of Edmonds Junior College from 1970 to 1980.

Warren became the director of the Museum of History and Industry in 1980 and remained in that position until his retirement in 1987.

In 1983 Warren began writing a weekly history column for the Seattle Post-Intelligencer.

Warren served on multiple boards including the Seattle Opera, Seattle Historical Society, Maryhill Museum, and Northwest Chapter of the 42nd (Rainbow) Division Veterans, as well as serving as the president of the Washington State and Seattle chapters of the American Ex-Prisoners of War.

In his 1989 Monograph, The Day Seattle Burned, Warren correctly re-identified Victor Clairmont's cabinet shop as the source of the Seattle fire rather than the commonly attributed James McGough's paint shop on the floor above.

== Publications ==
- Warren, James R (1981). King County and Its Queen City: Seattle - An Illustrated History. Windsor Publications. ISBN 0-89781-038-4.
- Warren, James R; McCoy, William R (1982). Highlights of Seattle's History (illustrated). Historical Society of Seattle. ISBN 0-939806-04-5.
- Warren, James R (1986). Where Mountains Meet the Sea: An Illustrated History of Puget Sound. Windsor Publications. ISBN -0-89781-175-5.
- Warren, James R (1989). A Century of Seattle's business. Vernon Publications, Inc. ISBN 1-878425-00-5.
- Warren, James R (1989). The Day Seattle Burned: June 4, 1889. Seattle Washington: James Warren.
- Warren, James R (1990). A Centennial History of the Seattle Tennis Club. Seattle, Washington: Seattle Tennis Club.
- Warren, James R; D'Hondt, Mary-Thadia; Historical Society of Seattle and King County (1997). King County and Its Emerald City, Seattle: an Illustrated history. Tarzana, California: American Historical Press. ISBN 0-9654754-2-5.
- Warren, James R (September 17, 1999). "A Century of Business". Puget Sound Business Journal.
- Warren, James R (2001). The War Years: A Chronicle of Washington State in World War II. Seattle, Washington: University of Washington Press. ISBN 0-295-98076-1.
- Warren, James R (2001). Seattle: 150 Years of Progress. Heritage Media Corporation. ISBN 1-886483-52-3.
