= Elliott Liu =

American chess player

Personal information
- Born: November 25, 1989 (age 36) Boston, Massachusetts, U.S.

Chess career
- Country: United States
- Title: FIDE Master (2006)
- FIDE rating: 2284 (November 2015)
- Peak rating: 2356 (October 2008)

Elliott Liu (born November 25, 1989, in Boston, Massachusetts, United States) is an American chess player from San Diego, California.

== Career ==
Liu first earned distinction by winning the 2005 U.S. Under 16 Chess Championship, and with it a full four-year scholarship to the University of Maryland as a Freshman in high school.

A year later, he then became the youngest player in the 2006 U.S. Chess Championship as a 16-year-old. In round 1, he surprised everybody by holding famous GM Alex Yermolinsky to a draw. Liu scored an even more impressive result the following day in round 2 by drawing Grandmaster Gregory Kaidanov, the third highest rated player in the United States at the time. Two weeks after the conclusion of the eventful tournament, "Elliott Liu Day" was proclaimed by the city of San Diego on April 25, 2006.

Later that year in August, Liu won a gold medal at the 2006 Pan-American Chess Championship held in Cuenca, Ecuador.

Upon graduating from The Bishop's School in 2008, he was a Standard-bearer for Tiger Woods and Rocco Mediate at the 2008 U.S. Open, witnessing Woods' most recent Major Championship victory. A couple months later, Liu matriculated at Stanford University. From 2003 through 2008, he was consistently ranked as one of the top five players in the United States for his age and represented the U.S. in three World Youth Championships during that time period: Greece in 2004, France in 2005, and Turkey in 2007.

Most recently, in January 2011 while studying abroad in Florence, Italy, Liu flew to New York City and ended up winning the "Extreme Chess Championship," a filmed tournament that was released in a four-part series on YouTube, concluding on April 28, 2012.

Currently, Liu has transitioned from competitive player to teacher of private students from around the world, producer of instructional video lessons for Chess.com, the world's most popular chess website, and host of "Your Games Analyzed," a weekly live webcast that can be watched by any of Chess.com's 5.6 million members. To date, he has produced 25 instructional video lessons for Chess.com, garnering over 145,000 views.
