= Louis S. Warren =

American historian (born 1962)

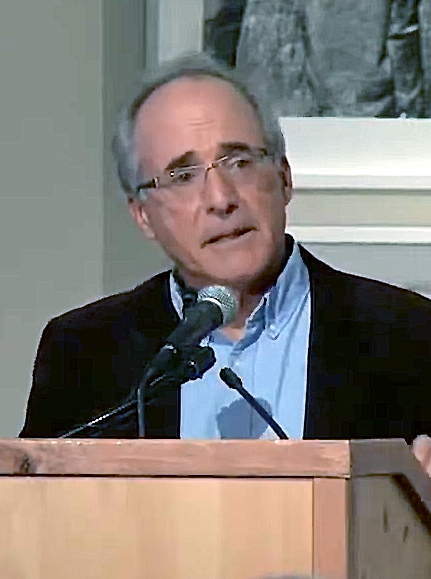
- Warren in 2018
- Born: December 8, 1962 (age 63); Pocatello, Idaho
- Education: Columbia University (BA); Yale University (PhD)
- Occupation: Historian
- Employer: University of California, Davis
- Known for: US Western and Environmental History
- Website: louiswarren.com

Louis S. Warren (born December 8, 1962) is an American historian and a W. Turrentine Jackson Professor of Western U.S. History at the University of California, Davis, where he teaches environmental history, the history of the American West, and U.S. history.

== Early life and education ==
Warren was born in Pocatello, Idaho. He is the third child of Claude and Elizabeth Warren.

Warren attended a two-room schoolhouse in the ghost town of Goodsprings, Nevada, and attended Basic High School in Henderson, Nevada. He was a British American Education Foundation Scholar at Cranleigh School, Surrey, UK, in 1980 – 81, and did his undergraduate work in history at Columbia University in New York, where he graduated in 1985.

He became a teacher at Peterhouse School in Zimbabwe from 1985 until 1987.

In 1988, he began graduate study at Yale University, where he received his Ph.D. in history in 1993.

== Professional career ==
In addition to teaching at UC Davis, Warren has written or edited several books on US Western and Environmental History. He is the co-editor of Boom: A Journal of California.

== Awards ==
He has received numerous awards for his writing, including:

- 1997 the National Cowboy Hall of Fame Wrangler Award for Best Non-Fiction Book.
- 2005 the Great Plains Distinguished Book Prize.
- 2006 Albert Beveridge Prize of the American Historical Association
- 2006 Caughey-Western History Association Prize of the Western History Association.
- 2006 Western Writers of America Spur Award for Historical Nonfiction.
- 2011 Guggenheim Fellowship for US History.
- 2018 Bancroft Prize.

== Publications ==
- The Hunter's Game: Poachers and Conservationists in Twentieth-Century America. Yale University Press. 1997. ISBN 978-0-300-06206-9. "Louis S. Warren."
- Louis S. Warren, ed. (2003). American environmental history. Wiley-Blackwell. ISBN 978-0-631-22863-9.
- Buffalo Bill's America: William Cody and the Wild West Show. Alfred A. Knopf. 2005. ISBN 978-0-375-41216-5.
- God's Red Son: The Ghost Dance Religion and the Making of Modern America. Basic Books. 2017. ISBN 978-0465015023.

== Reviews ==
- Geoffrey C. Ward (December 11, 2005). "Showman of the Wild Frontier". The New York Times.
