= The Bishop's School =

Prep school in La Jolla, California, United States

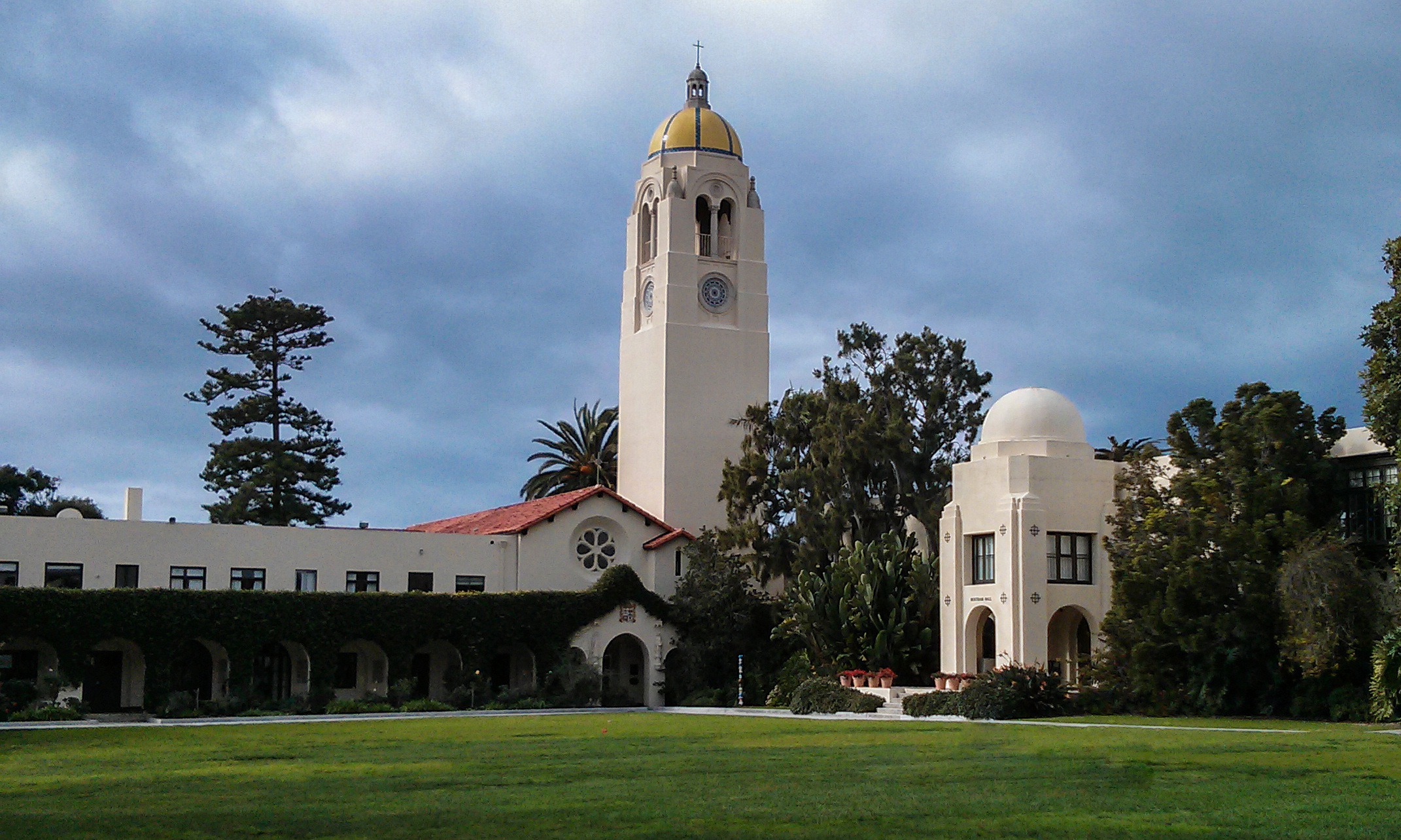
- View across the quadrangle

Location
- 7607 La Jolla Boulevard; San Diego, California, 92037; United States; 32°50′28″N 117°16′45″W

Information
- Type: Private, day, college-prep
- Denomination: Episcopal Church
- Established: Bishop's: 1909; San Miguel: 1951; Fully Merged: 1971
- Head of School: Ron Kim
- Faculty: 201
- Grades: 6–12
- Gender: Coeducational
- Enrollment: 800
- Campus size: 11 acres (45,000 m^{2})
- Campus type: Urban
- Colors: Maroon & Gold
- Mascot: Knights
- Accreditation: WASC
- Yearbook: El Miradero
- Website: www.bishops.com

The Bishop's School is an independent college preparatory Episcopal day school in La Jolla, California. The school offers courses for students in the sixth through twelfth grades and has an 8:1 student-teacher ratio.

== History ==
The Bishop's School was founded in 1909 by Ellen Browning Scripps and her half-sister (Eliza) Virginia Scripps, with gifts of land and funding, at the request of the Right Reverend Joseph Horsfall Johnson, at that time Bishop of the Episcopal Diocese of Los Angeles. Originally, it was a boarding school for girls only. From its founding, Bishop's oriented itself toward the elite colleges of the Northeast: its college-preparatory curriculum was designed to meet the entrance requirements of schools such as Vassar and Smith, and its early headmistresses were recruited from Eastern institutions including Radcliffe, Vassar, and the Cambridge School.

The earliest parts of the campus were designed by architect Irving Gill, responsible for a multitude of buildings in La Jolla. The current tower building was designed by Carleton Winslow as a replacement for the original Gill tower.

Bishop's became co-educational after merging with the nearby San Miguel School in 1971 under the leadership of headmaster Philip Perkins. The boarding department was closed after the 1982–1983 school year.

The school expanded to include sixth grade in the fall of 2009, with the first cohort graduating in 2016.

As of 2026, the school holds more than 118 California Interscholastic Federation titles.

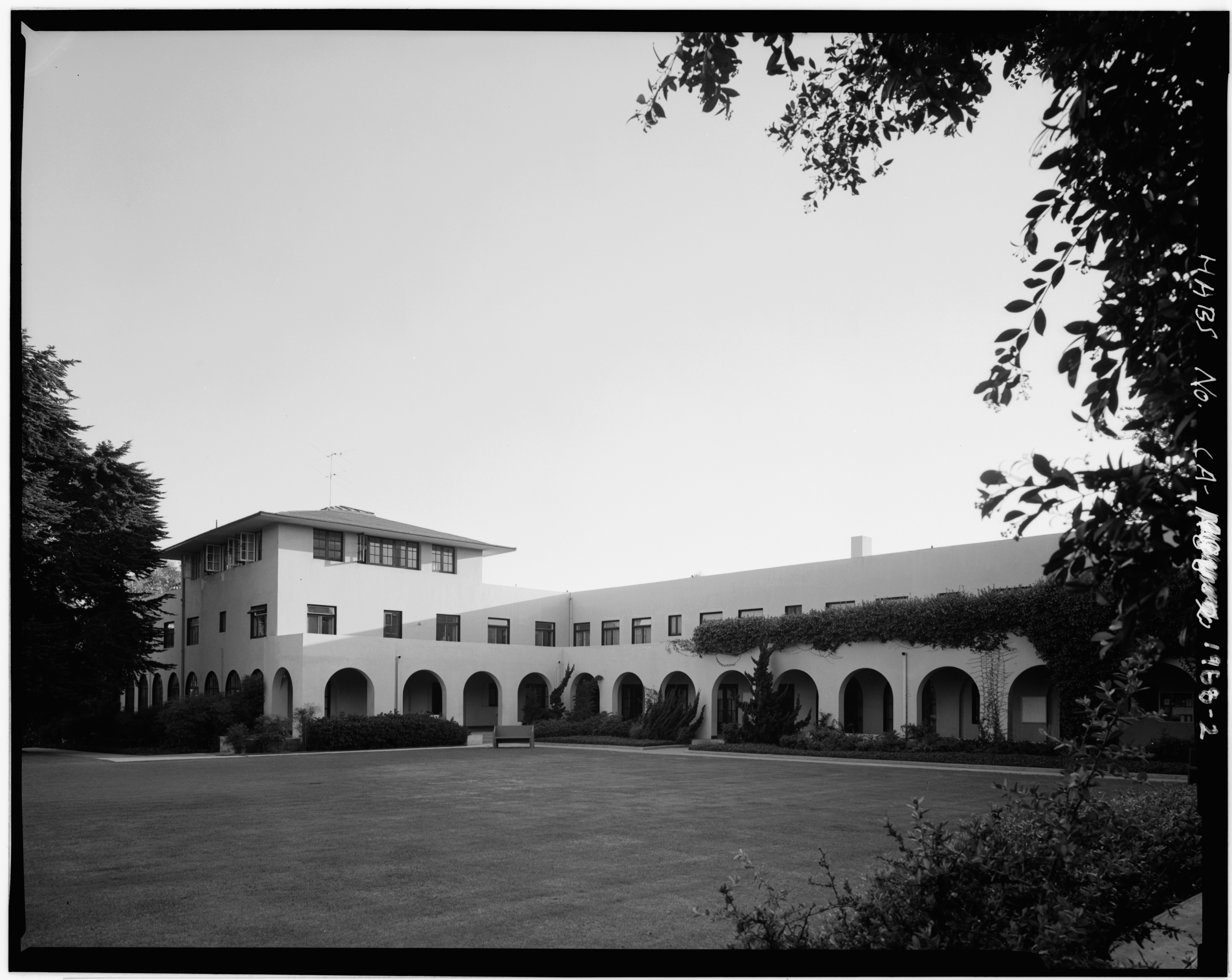
The school in 1968

== School structure ==
The Bishop's School has consistently been named a top private school both nationally and in California.

The Wall Street Journal recognized Bishop's in 2007 for its high matriculation rate to eight selective American colleges, and CBS recognized the school in 2011 noting Bishop's had higher matriculation rates to east-coast selective colleges than Deerfield Academy. The College Board's Advanced Placement program ranked the AP Biology program the strongest in the nation for two consecutive years (2004 and 2005), as Bishop's achieved the highest rate of achievement for medium-sized schools (300–799 students). As of 2026, Bishop’s remained ranked as the top Christian high school in California.

== Campus ==
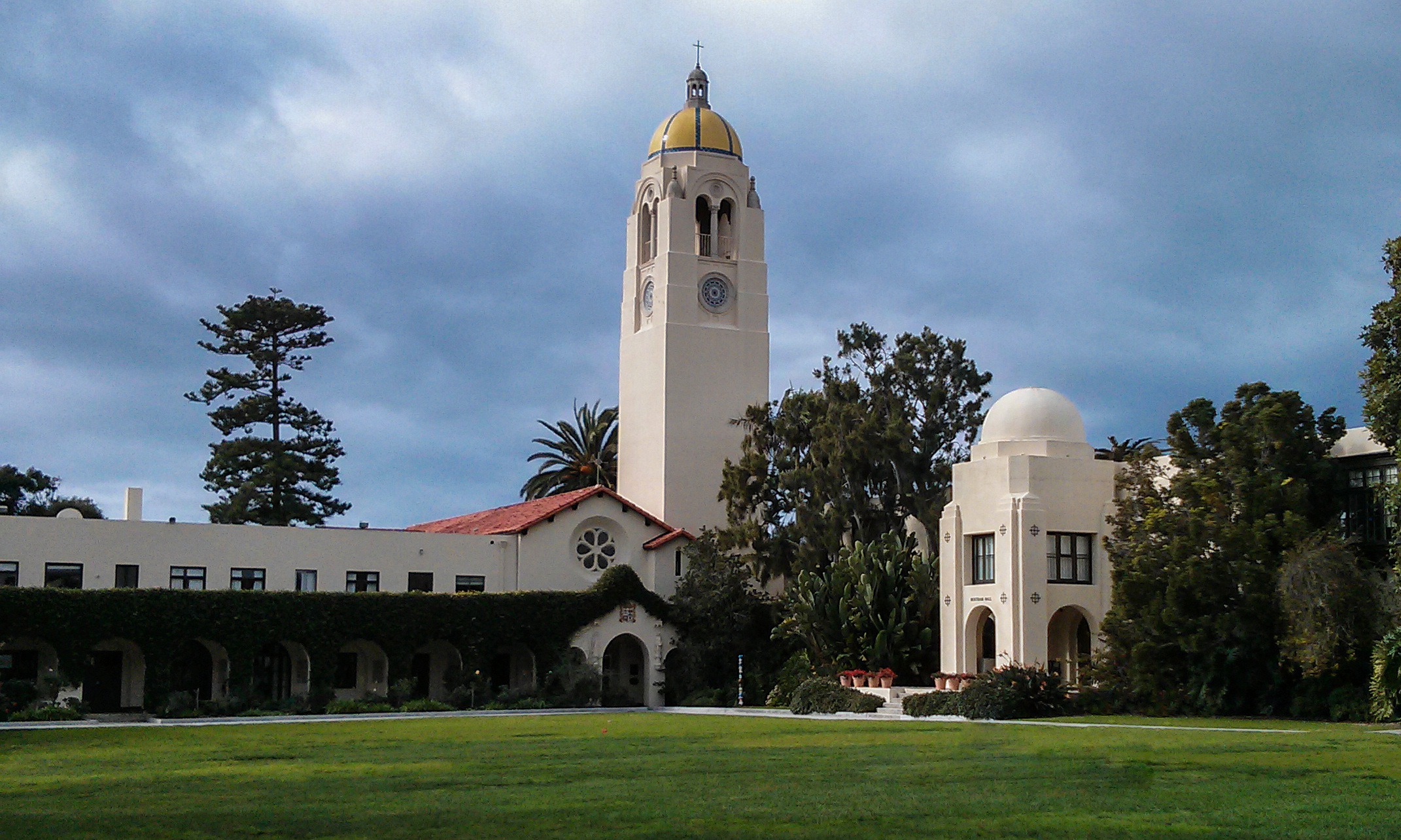
The Quad and surrounding buildings: Bentham Hall, St. Mary's Chapel, and the Tower

The Bishop's School's 11-acre campus is located in the heart of La Jolla. At the center of the campus is a grassy quadrangle, where tradition prohibits anyone from setting foot on "the quad" before noon.

The original campus surrounds the quad and includes buildings dating back to the turn of the twentieth century with many original buildings designed by famed architect Irving Gill, one of the pioneers of the modern movement in architecture. The school has been acquisitive of the surrounding real-estate, expanding the initial campus significantly over more than a century. Additions have included a science center, a football and field athletics center, and an aquatic center. The school has further plans to expand the campus.

The campus in its entirety was designated a historical landmark in 1998, with several buildings gaining individual historical standing of significance over the years starting in 1994: Bentham Hall (Irving Gill, 1909), Scripps Hall (Irving Gill, 1910–11), Gilman Hall (Irving Gill and Louis Gill, 1916), St. Mary's Chapel (Carleton Winslow, 1916), The Tower (Carleton Winslow, 1930), Wheeler J. Bailey Library (Carleton Winslow, 1935), and gardens.

== Notable alumni ==
The school is known to have educated the children of famous executives and athletes, such as Steve Kerr (Coach of the Golden State Warriors), Joseph Tsai (co-founder of Alibaba and owner of NBA’s Brooklyn Nets), Ralph Whitworth (Chairman of Hewlett Packard), Doug Manchester (American financier and former owner of The San Diego Union-Tribune), Jake Seau (Duke Lacrosse player, son of Junior Seau (American Football).

Famous alumni include:

- Pancho Barnes – 1919, pioneering female aviator
- Tyler Buchner – 2021, college football and lacrosse player
- Andrew Campbell – 2002, yachtsman, four-time All-American and 2008 Summer Olympics competitor
- Andrew Cunanan – 1987, American spree killer
- Gretel Ehrlich – 1963, travel writer, poet, and essayist
- M.F.K. Fisher – 1927, epicurean, culinary historian, and memoirist
- Alyse Galvin – Alaskan politician (born 1965)
- Marjory Gengler – 1969, tennis player
- Jean Guerrero – 2006, investigative journalist, author, and former foreign correspondent
- Jennifer Holt – 1930s, American actress
- J. J. Isler – 1981, yachtswoman, 1992 Summer Olympics medalist and America's Cup competitor
- Dmitri M. Johnson – 1999, Film & television producer, and co-founder of Story Kitchen
- Gary Jules – 1987, singer-songwriter
- Eric Lax – 1962, editor, writer, and author
- Elliott Liu – 2008, chess player
- Chris McKenna – 1988, television writer, producer, and film writer
- Inga Orekhova – 2009, professional basketball player
- Roy Perkins – 2008, Paralympic swimmer, two-time Paralympic gold medalist
- Ankur Rathee – 2009, actor and dancer
- Marc Rosen – 1994, film and television producer, including Sense8 on Netflix
- Honoré Desmond Sharrer – 1938, painter in the style of Magical Realism
- Kevin Stadler – 1998, professional golfer
- Bonnie St. John – 1982, the first African American woman to win a silver medal at the Paralympics
- Elise Trouw – 2017, pop/alternative/rock singer and multi-instrumentalist
- Colin Walsh – 2007, Major League Baseball player
- Shane Walton – 1998, NFL defensive back
- Melissa Winter – 1985, Deputy Chief of Staff for First Lady Michelle Obama

== Notable faculty ==
- Edith Head – Academy Award-winning costume designer; taught French and Spanish at the school early in her career
- Kirk McCaskill – former Major League Baseball pitcher and former professional ice hockey player; head baseball coach at the school
- Akili Smith – former American football quarterback; football coach at the school
- Shane Walton – 1998, NFL defensive back; Associate Dean of Students at the school

== Heads of School ==
- Anna Frances O'Hare Bentham – first headmistress, 1909–1915
- Margaret Gilman – headmistress, 1915–1918
- Marguerite Barton – headmistress, 1918–1921
- Caroline Cummins – headmistress, 1921–1953
- Rosamond Larmour – headmistress, 1953–1962
- Ruth Jenkins – headmistress, 1963–1971
- Philip Powers Perkins – headmaster, 1971–1973
- Dorothy Williams – headmistress, 1973–1983
- Michael Teitelman – headmaster 1983–2009
- Aimeclaire Lambert Roche – head of school, 2009–2018
- Carol Barry – interim head of school, 2018–2019
- Ron Kim – head of school, 2019–present

== Appearances in popular culture ==
- In 2011, the school and its campus appeared in Every 15 Minutes.
- In 2018, the school appeared in Twentieth Century-Fox’s American Crime Story: The Assassination of Gianni Versace.

== See also ==
- San Diego Historical Landmarks in La Jolla
- Primary and secondary schools in San Diego, California
