= Kepper =

Kepper or De Kepper is a surname. Notable people with the surname include:

- Anna Dean Kepper (1938–1983) American historian
- Christophe De Kepper, Belgian lawyer and sports administrator
- Troy Kepper (born 1982), American rower

== See also ==
- Hepper
- Klepper
