= Coast Walk Trail La Jolla =

Historic coastal footpath in California

Coordinates: 32°50′58″N 117°16′10″W

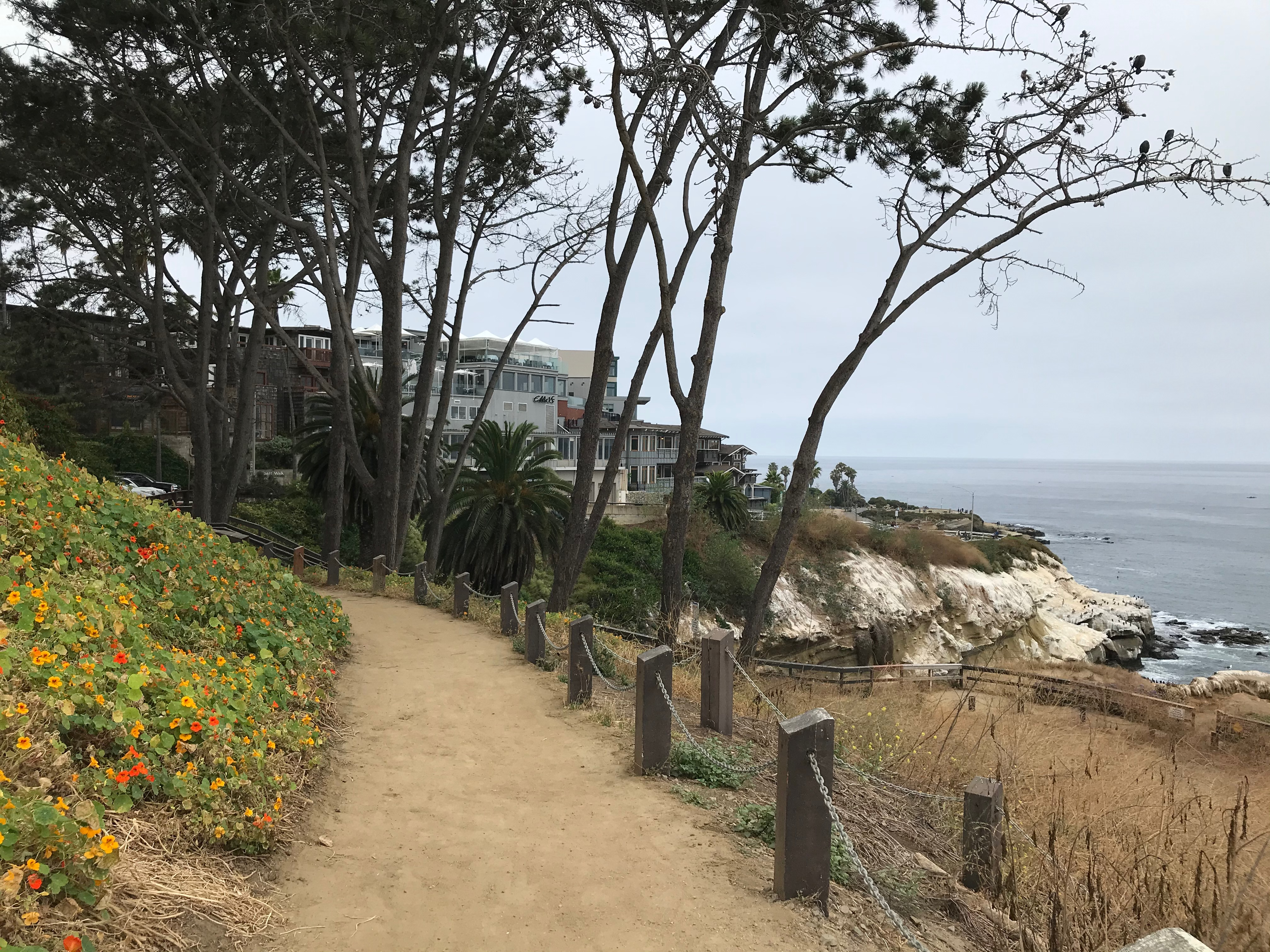
Coast Walk Trail, La Jolla

Coast Walk Trail is a pedestrian trail along the bluffs above sea caves in La Jolla, a community of San Diego, California.

== Location ==
The main trail follows the length of a span of rocky cliff bluffs of Cretaceous-age sandstone with terraces which range in height from 16 feet (4.9 m) at Goldfish Point to 116 feet (40 m). These terraced cliffs are usually filled with nesting cormorants, pelicans, and other sea birds.

== History ==
=== Pre-1887 ===
La Jolla was the location of a large habitation area known to early Kumeyaay inhabitants as Mut kula xuy (place of many caves). Spindrift, also called the La Jolla complex, encompasses the parcel of coastal land along La Jolla Shores down to La Jolla Cove. The area is rich in archaeological sources. The Kumeyaay refer to the area as the "Holy Land."

=== 1887-present ===
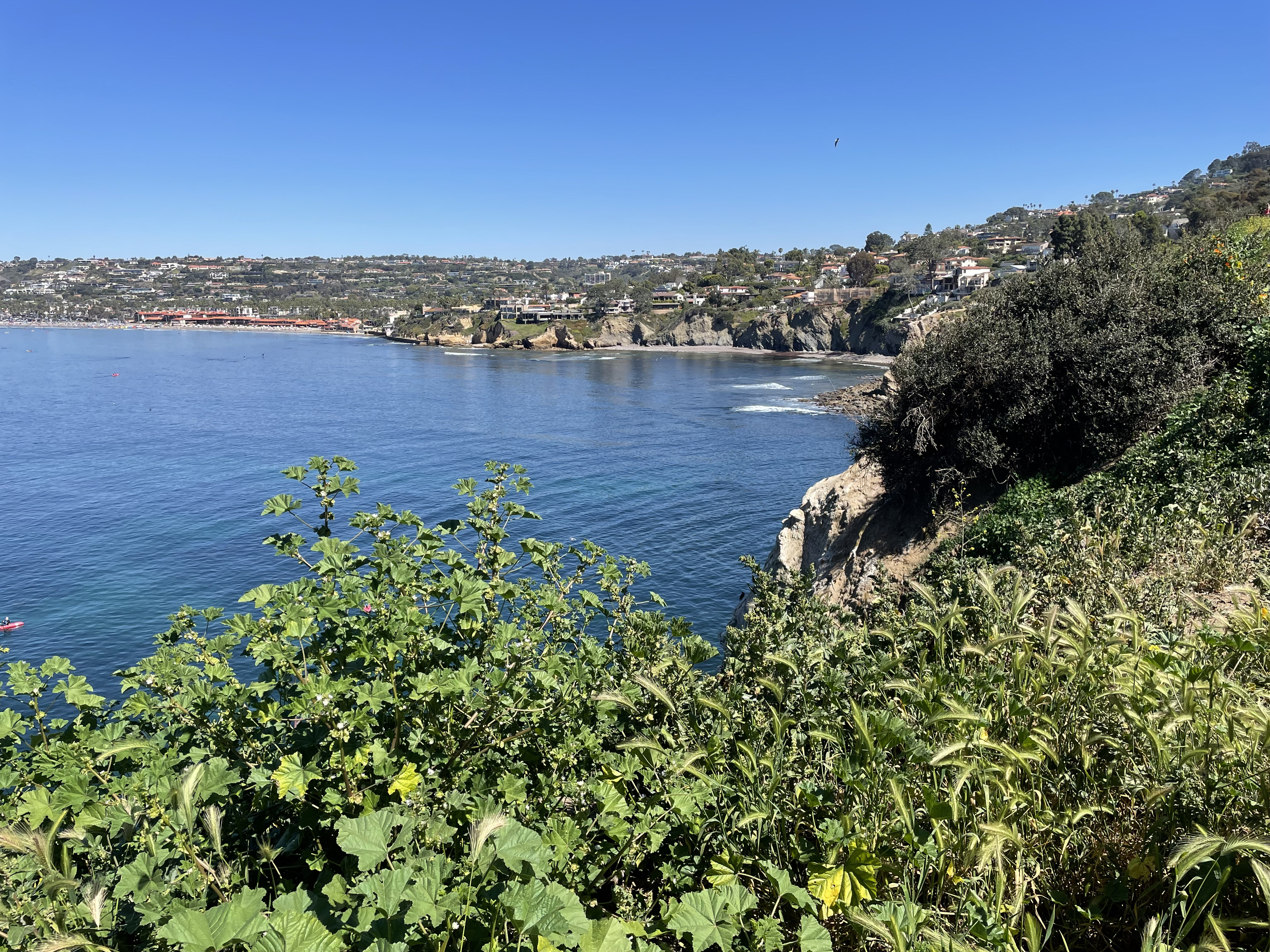
View from the Coast Walk Trail

In the mid-1880s, the anticipated arrival of the Southern Pacific and Santa Fe Railroads led to a real estate boom along the Southern California Coast. La Jolla, a remote area best known for its natural scenery, was targeted by developers for the construction of tourist facilities and residential housing. La Jolla Park was first subdivided and sold in 1887.

With the arrival of the San Diego, Pacific Beach, and La Jolla Railroad in 1894, La Jolla became a popular tourist destination that attracted visitors from the East, particularly during the winter months. The population increased from zero in 1887 to 350 in 1900.

Coast Walk Trail was promoted as an attraction by San Diego, Pacific Beach, and La Jolla Railroad. It provided precarious access to the rocky beaches below the La Jolla Caves where algae, seaweed, and sea moss, could be found. The collection of sea mosses was a popular pastime in the late Victorian era. Specimens were arranged into artistic shapes, dried, and pressed into card-stock booklets as souvenirs.

Initially, seaweed collectors had to slide down a steep notch in the sheer vertical face of the cliff above the caves, named Devil's Slide. In 1899, the railroad financed the construction of the footbridge over Devil's Slide and a much-photographed wooden stairway that survived intact until 1962.

In 1919, local philanthropist George W. Marston funded Los Angeles landscape designer Ralph D. Cornell to develop a plan for landscaping the area from Goldfish Point to Devil's Slide, to include the area along Coast Walk.

During the Great Depression, the Community Welfare Committee of the La Jolla Chamber of Commerce repaired the footbridge and stairs to the beach, and built cobble drains to prevent erosion.

The pedestrian path was named Coast Walk in 1963 when the City of San Diego Common Council set aside a public easement for the trail. A survey in 1993 confirmed the location of the public right of way.

== Historic Preservation ==
In 1990, Coast Walk Trail and the Devil's Slide Footbridge were designated as a San Diego Historical Landmark (HRBS 288). They are contributing resources to the La Jolla Park Coastal Historic District, listed on the National Register of Historic Places on May 9, 2024.

The Friends of Coast Walk help the City of San Diego Parks & Recreation department to maintain Coast Walk Trail. In 2022, the Friends of Coast Walk won the 2022 People in Preservation Award from Save Our Heritage Organisation (SOHO).
