= Hepper =

Hepper is a surname. Notable people with the surname include:

- Brian Hepper (born 1946), Australian rules footballer
- Frank Nigel Hepper (1929–2013), English botanist

== See also ==
- Hopper (surname)
- Kepper
