= Old Scripps Building =

- U.S. National Register of Historic Places
- U.S. National Historic Landmark
- San Diego Historic Landmark
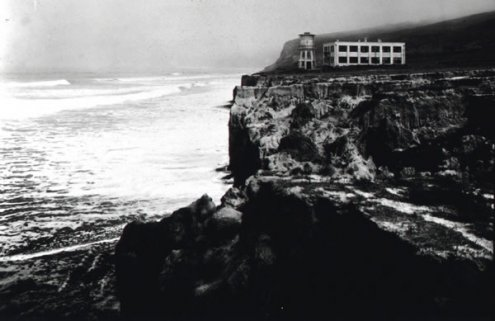
- Scripps Institution of Oceanography in La Jolla, CA (1910)

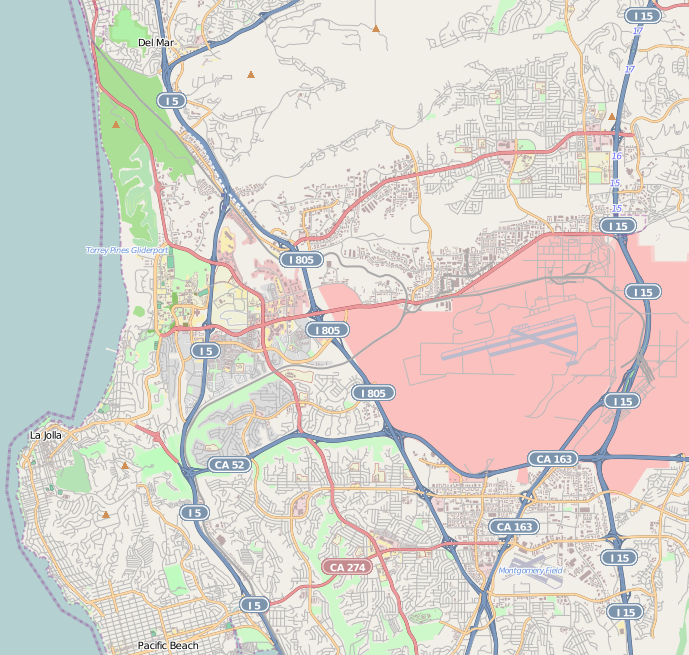
- Location within Northwestern San Diego Location within San Diego County, California Location within California Location within the United States
- Location: 8630 Discovery Way, La Jolla, California
- Coordinates: 32°51′54″N 117°15′12″W
- Area: .09 acres (3,900 sq ft; 360 m^{2})
- Built: 1909
- Architect: Perl Acton; Irving J. Gill
- Architectural style: Modern movement
- NRHP reference No.: 77000330
- SDHL No.: 119

Significant dates
- Added to NRHP: November 10, 1977
- Designated NHL: May 20, 1982
- Designated SDHL: May 6, 1977

The George H. Scripps Memorial Marine Biological Laboratory, known as the Old Scripps Building, is a historic research facility on the campus of the University of California, San Diego, in La Jolla, California. Built in 1909-10, it is the oldest oceanographic research building in continuous use in the United States and the historic center of the Scripps Institution of Oceanography. It is architecturally significant as a work of Modernist architect Irving J. Gill and for its early use of reinforced concrete. It was declared a National Historic Landmark in 1982. It now houses Scripps administrative offices.

== Description and history ==
The Old Scripps Building overlooks the Pacific coast near the Ellen Browning Scripps Memorial Pier on the campus of the Scripps Institution of Oceanography. It is set on a terrace about 15 feet (4.6 m) above the shore, and is a fairly undistinguished concrete structure, two stories in height, measuring about 50 by 75 feet (15 m × 23 m), with the long axis oriented roughly east–west. Windows are set by pairs in recessed bays, giving the surrounding concrete the appearance of structural piers. The interior plan has a wide central hall on each level, with areas on either side historically used for a variety of purposes. A lecture hall at the western end of the second floor once afforded views to the ocean.

Scripps Institution of Oceanography was founded in 1903 as the Marine Biological Association. It operated a laboratory in the Hotel del Coronado's boathouse at Glorietta Bight until 1905 when it moved to the "little Green Laboratory" at La Jolla Cove. In 1907, the association purchased a 170-acre (0.69 km^{2}) site, Pueblo Lot 1298, with financial support from E. W. Scripps and his half-sister Ellen Browning Scripps. The large tract of land, formerly owned by the City of San Diego, provided space for future expansion and isolation from the inevitable growth of La Jolla. Ellen Browning Scripps gave a substantial endowment that made possible the construction of the George H. Scripps Laboratory, or the Old Scripps Building, in 1909-10.

The Old Scripps Building was designed by Irving J. Gill, a San Diego–based architect who was a proponent of modernist architecture. It is an early example of reinforced concrete construction techniques.

In its early years, the building housed laboratories, offices, and also the residence of the institution's director. For a number of decades, it was used entirely for laboratories and research, and was vacated in 1977 after new facilities were built nearby. The university proposed its demolition, in part because the building did not meet modern seismic codes. Local preservationists banded together to raise funds for the building's restoration, including the reversal of alterations that interfered with the architect's original vision.

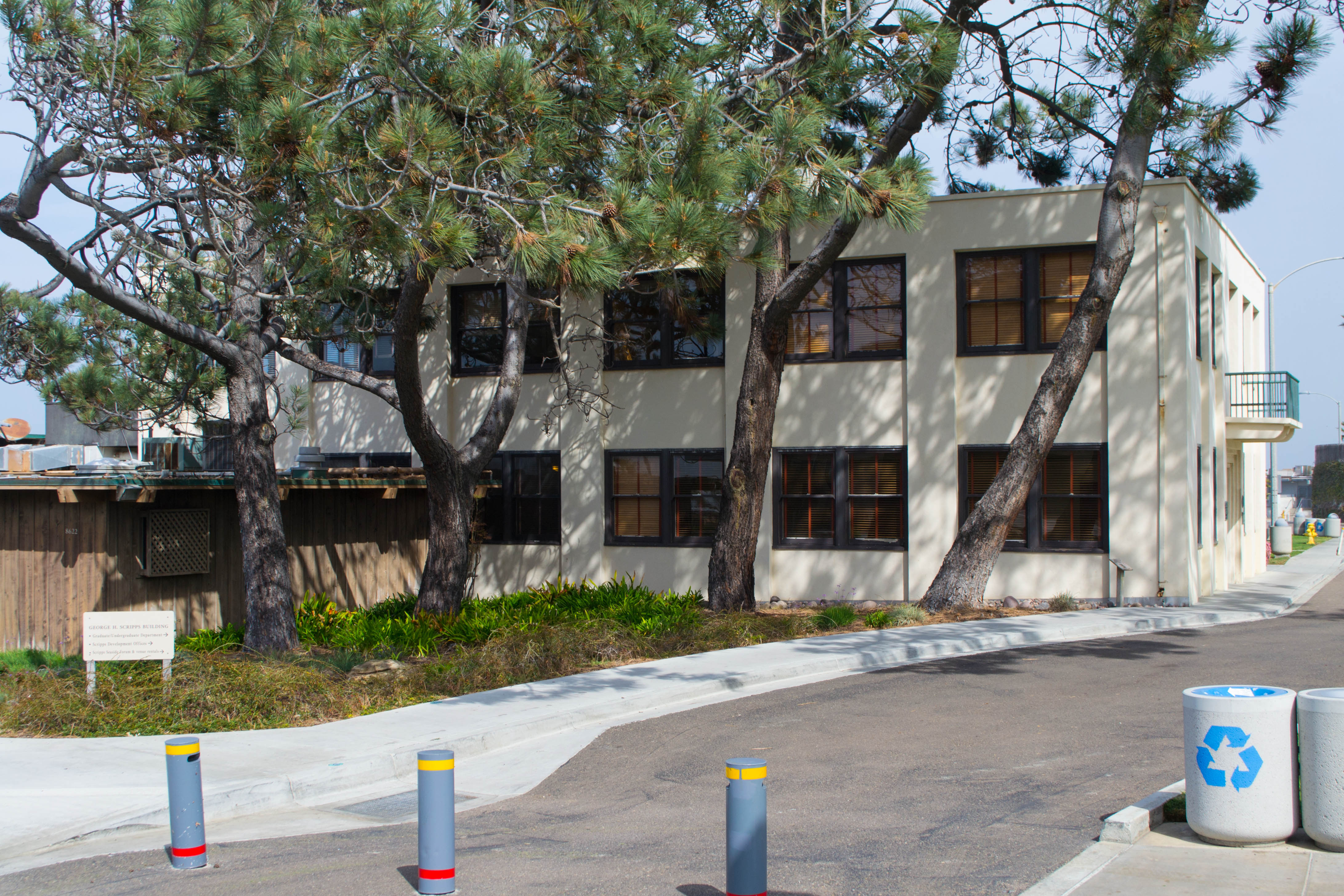
The Old Scripps Building at UC San Diego

== See also ==
- List of National Historic Landmarks in California
- San Diego Historical Landmarks in La Jolla, California
- La Jolla, San Diego-related topics
