= Elizabeth Warden =

Elizabeth Warden may refer to:

- Elizabeth Warden (swimmer) (born 1978), Canadian swimmer
- Elizabeth Warden (Keeping Up Appearances), a character from the British television show Keeping Up Appearances

== See also ==
- Elizabeth Arden (1881–1966), Canadian-American cosmetics businesswoman
- Elizabeth Arden, Inc., her company
- Elizabeth Warren (born 1949), U.S. senator since 2013 and 2020 presidential candidate
