= Elizabeth von Till Warren =

American historian and preservationist (1934–2021)

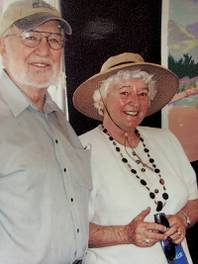
- Drs. Claude and Elizabeth Warren in 2007
- Born: Mary Elizabeth von Till; April 16, 1934; Brooklyn, New York
- Died: April 21, 2021 (aged 87); Las Vegas, Nevada
- Occupation: Historian
- Known for: Historic Preservation in Clark County Nevada.
- Spouse: Claude Nelson Warren

Academic background
- Education: Washington State University
- Thesis: The history of Las Vegas Springs, a disappeared resource (2001)
- Doctoral advisor: Orlan J. Svingen

Elizabeth von Till Warren (April 16, 1934 – April 21, 2021) was an American historian and preservationist. She had expertise in the history of water development in the Mojave Desert and the Las Vegas Valley in particular. She also had expertise in the historical route of the Old Spanish Trail in Southern Nevada.

She was married to Claude Warren. They had four children: Claude Jr., Susan, Louis, and Jonathan.

Her papers are available at Special Collections, University of Nevada, Las Vegas.

== Early life ==
Warren was the sixth of eight children born in Brooklyn, New York, to Louis Alois von Till and Mary Ellen von Till née McNulty.

She attended Barnard College, where she earned her bachelor's degree in anthropology in 1955. She then attended Northwestern University as a Carnegie Fellow in the African Studies Program. While at Northwestern Warren met and, in December, 1955, married Claude Warren, who was also attending Northwestern as a Carnegie Fellow in the African Studies Program.

== Professional career ==
In 1974 she earned her Masters in history from the University of Nevada, Las Vegas. Her thesis revisited Antonio Armijo's route through the Las Vegas valley.

Warren earned her Ph.D. from Washington State University with a dissertation on the history of the Las Vegas springs. Her work chronicled the boom and bust of water development in the Southern Nevada Mojave Desert, from 1844 to the late 20th century.

Warren taught history and anthropology for Clark County Community College, University of Nevada, Las Vegas, and Clark County School District Professional Growth Services. She was a volunteer instructor in history of water use in the Las Vegas Valley for Nevada Project Wet, a water education program for teachers sponsored by the US Bureau of Reclamation and the Nevada Division of Environmental Protection.

She was an archivist for the Women's Archives in the Special Collections Department of the University of Nevada, Las Vegas Library.

She testified in support of the Nevada Wilderness Act of 1985 which created the Great Basin National Park at both the Ely and Las Vegas hearings. As the Director of Cultural Focus, the tourism outreach program of the Allied Arts Council of Southern Nevada, she spoke of the need to preserve the Nevada wilderness in support of tourism in the state.

She was an historian for HRA, Inc., Conservation Archaeology. where her work entailed preparing historical component and evaluating cultural resources for projects in southern Nevada, including Table Mountain Wind Project in Spring Mountains (Yellow Pine Mining District), Corn Creek Field Station, and all remaining parcels in Las Vegas Valley which the BLM was preparing for public auction. She wrote the history of the Las Vegas Wash for the US Department of Interior, Bureau of Reclamation, Boulder City, Nevada.

== Preservation ==
Warren was a resident of Southern Nevada, moving to Las Vegas in 1969 and was active in anthropological and historical research of the region, and related historic preservation projects, notably the Goumond House now located at the Clark County Museum, Old Las Vegas Mormon Fort, Las Vegas Springs, Old Spanish Trail, Spring Mountain Ranch State Park, Oliver Ranch, Yellow Pine Mining District, Eldorado Canyon Mining District, Historic Fifth Street School, Las Vegas High School and the Huntridge Theater.

She has developed, designed or significantly contributed to area exhibits at virtually all historical water resources in southern Nevada, including Valley of Fire State Park, Tule Springs, Goodsprings, Spring Mountain Ranch, Clark County Wetlands Park, the Old Las Vegas Mormon Fort, the Old Spanish Trail Park and Las Vegas Springs, where Las Vegas began.

She was the founder and president of Friends of Big Springs, the organization that preserved Big Springs and helped to create the Las Vegas Springs Preserve.

She was instrumental in the creation of the Neon Museum.

She was a former national President of Old Spanish Trail Association and President of the Nevada Chapter. Warren was also a Past President of Southern Nevada Historical Society, Preservation Association of Clark County and a former Southern Nevada representative to National Trust for Historic Preservation.

She won numerous awards for public service and historic preservation, including the Daughters of the American Revolution’s National Preservation Award for 2004–2005. In May of 2021 she posthumously received the Excellence in Preservation award from the Las Vegas Historic Preservation Commission.

A video interview of her was produced by the Nevada Women's Virtual Center as part of their "Nevada Women’s Legacy – 150 Years of Excellence" project.

== Publications ==
- Warren, Elizabeth von Till (1974). Armijo's Trace Revisited: A New Interpretation of the Impact of the Antonio Armijo Route of 1829–1830 on the Development of the Old Spanish Trail (MA thesis). Las Vegas, Nevada: University of Nevada, Las Vegas.
- Coombs, Gary B.; Crabtree, Robert H.; Warren, Elizabeth; Ritter, Eric W.; Archaeological Research, Inc. (1979). The archaeology of the northeast Mojave Desert (Technical report). Riverside, California: United States Bureau of Land Management.
- Warren, Elizabeth (1980), Las Vegas Fort: old values, new meaning : an exhibition, Las Vegas, Nevada: Preservation Association of Clark County (Nevada)
- Warren, Claude N; Knack, Martha C; Warren, Elizabeth; Ritter, Eric W; United States Bureau of Land Management Desert Planning Staff (1980). A cultural resource overview for the Amargosa-Mojave basin planning units (Technical report). Riverside, California: United States Bureau of Land Management.
- Lyneis, Margaret M; Weide, David L; Warren, Elizabeth; Ritter, Eric W; United States Bureau of Land Management Desert Planning Staff (1980). Impacts, damage to cultural resources in the California desert (Technical report). Riverside, California: United States Bureau of Land Management.
- Warren, Elizabeth; Roske, Ralph Joseph; United States Bureau of Land Management Desert Planning Staff (1981). Cultural resources of the California desert, 1776–1880 : historic trails and wagon roads (Technical report). Riverside, California: United States Bureau of Land Management.
- Warren, Elizabeth; Ritter, Eric W; United States Bureau of Land Management Desert Planning Staff (1981). A Cultural resources overview of the Colorado desert planning units (Technical report). Riverside, California: United States Bureau of Land Management.
- Warren, Elizabeth von Till (2001). The History of Las Vegas Springs, A Disappeared Resource (Ph.D. thesis). Pullman, Washington: Washington State University.
- "The Old Spanish National Historic Trail". Pathways Across America, Partnership for the National Trail System. 2004. Archived from the original on March 8, 2008.
- Warren, Elizabeth von Till; Eskenazi, Suzanne Beryl (2007). Passing through : the history of Clark County Wetlands Park, Henderson, Nevada. United States Bureau of Reclamation, Lower Colorado Region (Report). Boulder City, Nevada: HRA, Inc., Conservation Archaeolog.
- Roberts, Heidi; Warren, Elizabeth von Till; Eskenazi, Suzanne Beryl (2007). Coyote named this place Pakonapanti : Corn Creek National Register Archaeological District, Desert National Wildlife Refuge, Clark County, Nevada. U.S. Fish and Wildlife Service Desert National Wildlife Refuge (Report). Las Vegas, Nevada: HRA, Inc., Conservation Archaeolog.
