= Anna Dean Kepper =

Anna Dean Kepper.

Anna Dean Kepper (May 12, 1938 – December 21, 1983) was a historian and a curator of Nevada history and the history of Las Vegas who helped save historic structures in that city.

== Early life and education ==
Born in Seattle, Washington, Kepper received master's degrees in both museology and American folk culture from the State University of New York at Oneonta. She earned a third master's degree in public administration from the University of Nevada, Las Vegas after moving to Las Vegas in 1973.

Kepper was curator of the UNLV Special Collections from 1975 to 1983. She was responsible for many of the most significant historic preservation efforts in Las Vegas and for bringing a number of historically significant collections into the UNLV Libraries.

== UNLV Special Collections ==
Kepper helped save the "Houssels House" on the UNLV campus, UNLV's oldest building. Throughout her eight years at UNLV, Kepper brought many historical collections to UNLV Libraries.

== Preserving Nevada history ==
Kepper was also a member of the Boulder City Museum and Historical Association, the Nevada Historical Society, the Nevada State Library Association, the Preservation Association of Clark County, and the Southern Nevada Historical Society. She served as Nevada's representative for the National Trust for Historic Preservation, and was one of the founders and first president of the Association for the Preservation of the Las Vegas Fort in 1973.

In addition to saving the UNLV Houssels House, Kepper also helped to save the Las Vegas Mormon Fort, and assisted Boulder city in earning designation as a National Historic Landmark.

== Death ==
After being diagnosed with breast cancer, Kepper underwent both surgery and chemotherapy. She completed her master's degree in public administration from UNLV 19 days before her death from breast cancer in 1983. She was 45 years old, and was awarded the degree posthumously.
