= Malcolm Jennings Rogers =

Malcolm Jennings Rogers (1890–1960) was a pioneering archaeologist in Southern California, Baja California, and Arizona.

Born in Fulton, New York, Rogers studied mining geology at Syracuse University and initially worked as a mining geologist. After service in the U.S. Marine Corps during World War I, he moved to Escondido, California, in 1919 and took up citrus farming. However, he was soon involved with local archaeology and associated with the San Diego Museum of Man. He moved to San Diego and became a full-time curator at the museum in 1930, continuing at that post until his resignation in 1945. Health and other personal problems resulted in a hiatus in his archaeological work, which he resumed in 1958 as a research associate at the museum. He was working on his previous notes and collections in 1960 when a traffic accident caused his death (Ezell 1961; Pourade 1966; Hanna 1982, 2013).

Rogers' fieldwork included extensive survey and excavation work in the coastal zone of San Diego County and northwestern Baja California, as well as throughout the California deserts to the east and western Arizona (Apple 2013; Hedges 2013; Laylander and Bendímez 2013; Pigniolo 2013; Schaefer 2013; Schneider 2013). He identified and named the San Dieguito, La Jolla, Amargosa, and Yuman archaeological complexes (Rogers 1929a, 1929b, 1939, 1945, 1966; Warren 1966, 2013; Sutton 2013). He also produced one of the earliest ethnoarchaeological studies of pottery-making among the surviving native peoples of his region (Rogers 1936; Panich and Wilken-Robertson 2013).

Rogers' contributions were sometimes confusing to his successors, as in the case of his changing nomenclature for the San Dieguito complex and its constituent phases. Working primarily before the advent of radiocarbon dating, he adhered to a short chronology for regional prehistory that has subsequently been discarded. His published observations, manuscript notes, and collections on aboriginal ceramics were never worked into a full-blown typology, and later analysts have interpreted them with markedly different conclusions (Schroeder 1958; May 1978; Van Camp 1979; Waters 1982a, 1982b; Seymour 1997; Burton and Quinn 2013). One researcher noted that Rogers' reports "so often present his formulations without detailing the evidence on which they are founded" (Ezell 1961:533). Nonetheless, these formulations continue to be the starting point for most research in the region, and his observations of so much that has subsequently been lost from the archaeological record have become indispensable.
