= San Dieguito complex =

Holocene archaeological pattern

The San Dieguito complex is an archaeological pattern left by early Holocene inhabitants of Southern California and surrounding portions of the Southwestern United States and northwestern Mexico. Radiocarbon dating places a 10,200 BP (Before Present) (8200 BCE) date consideration.

== Archaeology ==
The complex was first identified by Malcolm J. Rogers in 1919 at site SDI-W-240 in Escondido in San Diego County, California. He assigned the Paleo-Indian designation of 'Scraper Makers' to the prehistoric producers of the complex, based on the common occurrence of unifacially flaked lithic (stone) tools at their sites.

In an initial synthesis, Rogers (1929) suggested that the Scraper Makers were the region's second inhabitants, following the people of the Shell Midden culture, later known as the La Jolla complex, whose remains lie closer to the coast. However, his 1938 excavations at the C. W. Harris Site (CA-SDI-149) in Rancho Santa Fe established that the site's San Dieguito component underlay its La Jolla component, at the base of the stratigraphic sequence.

Subsequent excavations at the Harris Site confirmed Rogers' main conclusions and obtained radiocarbon dates that placed the site's occupation as far back as 10,200 BP (8200 BCE).

Characteristics suggested for San Dieguito complex assemblages, in addition to the abundant scrapers, have included large, percussion-flaked bifaces; flaked crescentic stones; Lake Mohave or Silver Lake style projectile points; a scarcity or absence of milling tools (manos and metates); and an absence of small projectile points and pottery.

== Interpretations ==
Rogers recognized three distinct chronological phases for the San Dieguito complex, based primarily on changes in lithic technology, site locations, and site types. His changing terminology for these phases (including the equation of "Malpais" and "San Dieguito I") have caused some confusion in the archaeological literature. Most researchers do not now use these subdivisions.

Interpretations of the San Dieguito complex have varied. Some have seen its makers as big game hunters, perhaps in succession to the late Pleistocene-era Clovis culture, while others have seen them as generalized foragers. While Rogers viewed the San Dieguito complex as the product of a chronologically and ethnically distinct people, some subsequent researchers have stressed evidence of continuity with the subsequent La Jolla complex. A more radical reinterpretation has suggested that the San Dieguito complex was neither chronologically nor ethnically distinct, but represents a specialized activity set (perhaps related to lithic quarrying or stone tool production) of the same people who produced the La Jolla complex throughout most of the Holocene.

Rogers (1966) extended the San Dieguito label to a wide region of western North America, recognizing four major regions: a Central Aspect, in southeastern California, western Nevada, and northeastern Baja California; a Southwestern Aspect, in southwestern California and most of Baja California; a Southeastern Aspect, in the Yuma Desert of southern Arizona and Sonoran Desert of northern Sonora; and a Western Aspect, in north eastern California's upper Great Basin. In the latter, early Holocene remains are more generally assigned to the Borax Lake Complex and Post Pattern. In the Mojave Desert and the lower Great Basin, such remains are now most frequently termed the Lake Mohave Complex. The San Dieguito complex nomenclature is still in active use in southwestern California, the Colorado Desert, northern Baja California, and northern Sonora Mexico.

== Bibliography ==
- Gallegos, Dennis R., ed. (1987). "San Dieguito-La Jolla: Chronology and Controversy". San Diego County Archaeological Society Research Paper (1). OCLC 19796833.
- Rogers, Malcolm J. (1929). "The Stone Art of the San Dieguito Plateau". American Anthropologist. 31 (3): 454–467. doi:10.1525/aa.1929.31.3.02a00050. ISSN 0002-7294.
- Rogers, Malcolm J. (1939). "Early Lithic Industries of the Lower Basin of the Colorado River and Adjacent Areas". San Diego Museum Papers. San Diego Museum papers; no. 3 (3). San Diego: San Diego Museum. hdl:2027/uc1.32106006739293. OCLC 647678219.
- Rogers, Malcolm J. (1966). Ancient Hunters of the Far West. San Diego: Union-Tribune Publishing. OCLC 969141.
- Warren, Claude N.; True, D. L. (1961). "The San Dieguito Complex and its Place in California Prehistory". University of California, Los Angeles, Archaeological Survey Annual Report (1960–1961): 246–307. OCLC 20790643.
- Warren, Claude N. (1966). "The San Dieguito Type Site: M. J. Rogers' 1938 Excavation on the San Dieguito River". San Diego Museum Papers (5). San Diego: San Diego Museum.
- Warren, Claude N. (1967). "The San Dieguito Complex: A Review and Hypothesis" (PDF). American Antiquity. 32 (2): 168–185. doi:10.2307/277902. ISSN 0002-7316. JSTOR 277902. S2CID 162139710.
