= Clement Woodward Meighan =

American archaeologist (1925–1997)

Clement Woodward Meighan (1925–1997) was an archaeologist who made notable contributions to reconstructing the prehistory of southern California, Baja California, and west central Mexico.

== Early life and education ==
Meighan was born in San Francisco and raised there, as well as in Phoenix, Arizona and California's San Joaquin Valley. Serving in World War II, he was severely wounded. After the war, while still convalescing, he began studies at the University of California, Berkeley, where he received his undergraduate and doctoral degrees in anthropology.

== Career ==
Meighan was hired as an instructor in anthropology at the University of California, Los Angeles in 1952 and continued at UCLA until his retirement in 1991. He founded UCLA's Archaeological Survey, chaired its anthropology department, and played key roles in several regional and national organizations. His fieldwork was widely dispersed, including stints throughout various parts of California and in Utah, Arizona, Baja California, western and central Mexico, Belize, Costa Rica, Chile, Guam, Nubia, and Syria.

Meighan published scores of archaeological monographs and reviews. Topically, his contributions to faunal analysis, rock art studies, and obsidian hydration analysis may be particularly noted. His work was seminal for the prehistoric archaeology of at least four regions: southern California's Channel Islands, San Diego County, Baja California, and west central Mexico.

In his later years, he advocated for retention of archaeological collections on the basis of their scientific value, a perspective that has been contested since his passing.
