= La Jolla complex =

Prehistoric culture in southwestern California and northwestern Baja California

Coordinates: 32.628°N 116.003°W

La Jolla Complex
- Horizon: Millingstone Horizon
- Geographical range: Southwestern California, Northwestern Baja California
- Period: Middle Holocene
- Dates: c. 8000 BC to AD 500
- Type site: La Jolla, California
- Major sites: La Jolla
- Preceded by: San Dieguito complex
- Followed by: Campbell tradition (northern reaches)
- Defined by: Malcolm J. Rogers

The archaeological La Jolla complex (Shell Midden People, Encinitas Tradition, Millingstone Horizon) represents a prehistoric culture oriented toward coastal resources that prevailed during the middle Holocene period between c. 8000 BC and AD 500 in southwestern California and northwestern Baja California.

== Description ==
Characteristics of the La Jolla complex include hand stones and basin or slab milling stones (manos and metates), rough percussion-flaked stone edge tools, flexed burials, and extensive exploitation of shellfish, particularly venus clam (Chione spp.), scallop (Argopecten aequisulcatus), mussel (Mytilus californianus), and oyster (Ostrea lurida). Cogged stones and discoidals are distinctive but unusual artifacts. Other uncommon artifacts include shell ornaments (primarily spire-removed Olivella spp. beads) and projectile points (Pinto, Gypsum, and Elko forms). Bones from sea mammals and fish occur in La Jollan middens, but they are not abundant. Fish remains usually represent near-shore species, pointing to a littoral rather than maritime economy.

The La Jolla complex was initially characterized as the Shell Midden people by Malcolm J. Rogers, the region's pioneering archaeologist. Rogers distinguished successive phases for the complex. Subsequent investigators have sometimes proposed modified versions of Rogers' phase sequence, but the most striking characteristics of the complex may be its comparatively simple material remains and its long cultural continuity, at least in the San Diego region. Claude N. Warren relabelled the complex as the Encinitas Tradition, which extended as far north as the Santa Barbara Channel region but was replaced by the Campbell tradition in its northern reaches after about 2000 BC. An inland counterpart of the La Jolla complex was the Pauma complex.

== Human remains ==
Two human skeletons, a male and a female, were found in La Jolla, California, in 1976; they date back at least 9,500 years. They were found during construction work on a house. They were the subject of a decade-long legal battle.

The University of California decided to return the remains to one of the local Kumeyaay Indian bands. This was done in 2016.

== See also ==
- San Diego Historical Landmarks in La Jolla
- Paleo-indians
