= Jeff Passan =

American sportswriter (born 1980)

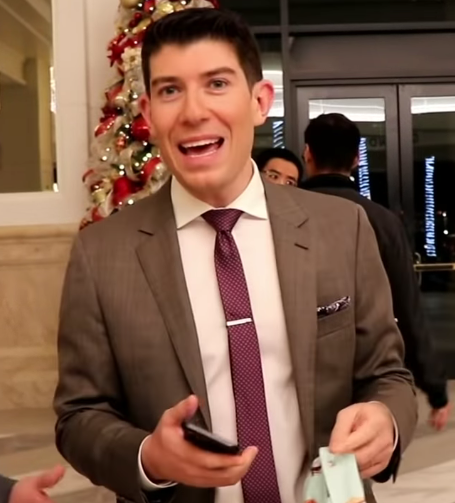
- Passan in 2019
- Born: 1980 (age 45–46); Cleveland, Ohio, U.S.
- Education: Syracuse University
- Occupations: Sportswriter; author
- Years active: 2004–present
- Spouse: Sara Rieke (m. 2007)
- Children: 1

Jeffrey Scott Passan (born 1980) is an American baseball sportswriter and author.

== Early life and education ==
Passan was born in Cleveland, Ohio. He is Jewish, and grew up attending Hebrew school. After graduating from Solon High School in suburban Cleveland, Passan attended the S. I. Newhouse School of Public Communications at Syracuse University, where he wrote for The Daily Orange and graduated in 2002 with a degree in journalism.

== Career ==
Passan began covering baseball in 2004 at The Kansas City Star, before moving to Yahoo! two years later. After 13 years at Yahoo! (2006–2018), he announced that he was joining ESPN's baseball team in January 2019. In 2022, Passan signed a four-year, $4 million contract extension with ESPN. While working at ESPN, he made guest appearances on SportsCenter, Get Up, The Rich Eisen Show, The Pat McAfee Show and other ESPN studio shows.

In 2018, while at Yahoo! Sports, Passan declined to submit his Baseball Hall of Fame ballot after Hall of Famer Joe Morgan circulated a letter urging voters to bar players linked to performance-enhancing drugs. He has since argued that the Hall’s continued exclusion of candidates such as Barry Bonds and Roger Clemens represents a failure of the voting process.

Passan is the author of The Arm: Inside the Billion-Dollar Mystery of the Most Valuable Commodity in Sports, and the co-author of Death to the BCS: The Definitive Case Against the Bowl Championship Series.

== Awards and recognition ==
Passan has been a member of the Baseball Writers' Association of America since 2004, while he was at The Kansas City Star. The National Sports Media Association named Passan as the National Sportswriter of the Year in 2021 and again in 2023.

Passan received the 2022 Dan Jenkins medal for Excellence in Sportswriting for his ESPN article, "San Francisco Giants Outfielder Drew Robinson's Remarkable Second Act."

== Personal life ==
Passan married his wife, Sara Rieke, at Ellen Browning Scripps Memorial Park in La Jolla, California on January 6, 2007.

In 2023, Passan was struck by a falling tree limb at his home in Kansas City after a storm, fracturing his back. He retained the use of his limbs and extremities.

In 2025, his son, Jack, committed to play college baseball at Williams College.
