= Ellen Browning Scripps Memorial Park =

Park in San Diego, California

Coordinates: 32°51′0″N 117°16′27″W

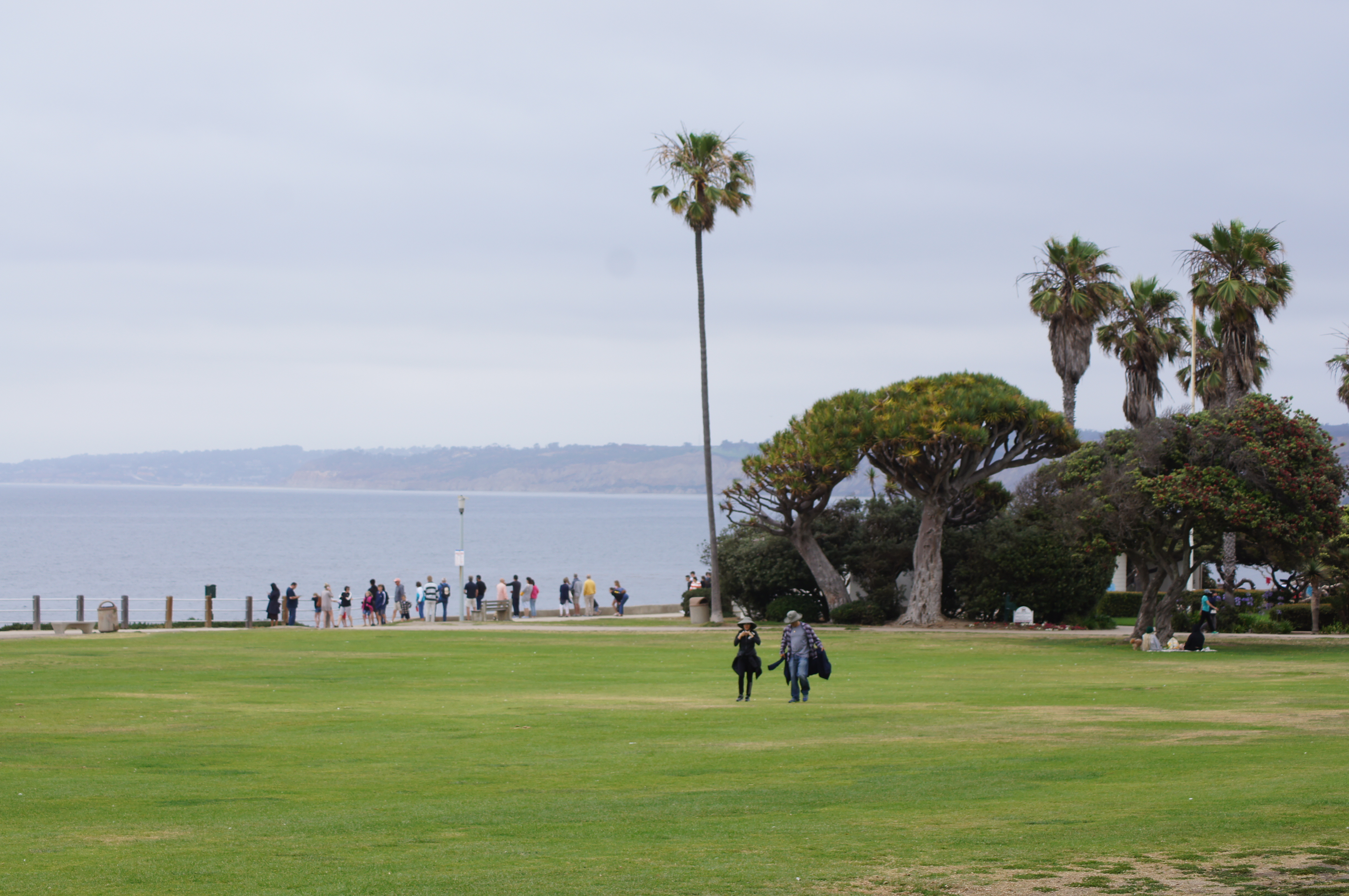
Ellen Browning Scripps Park, 2019

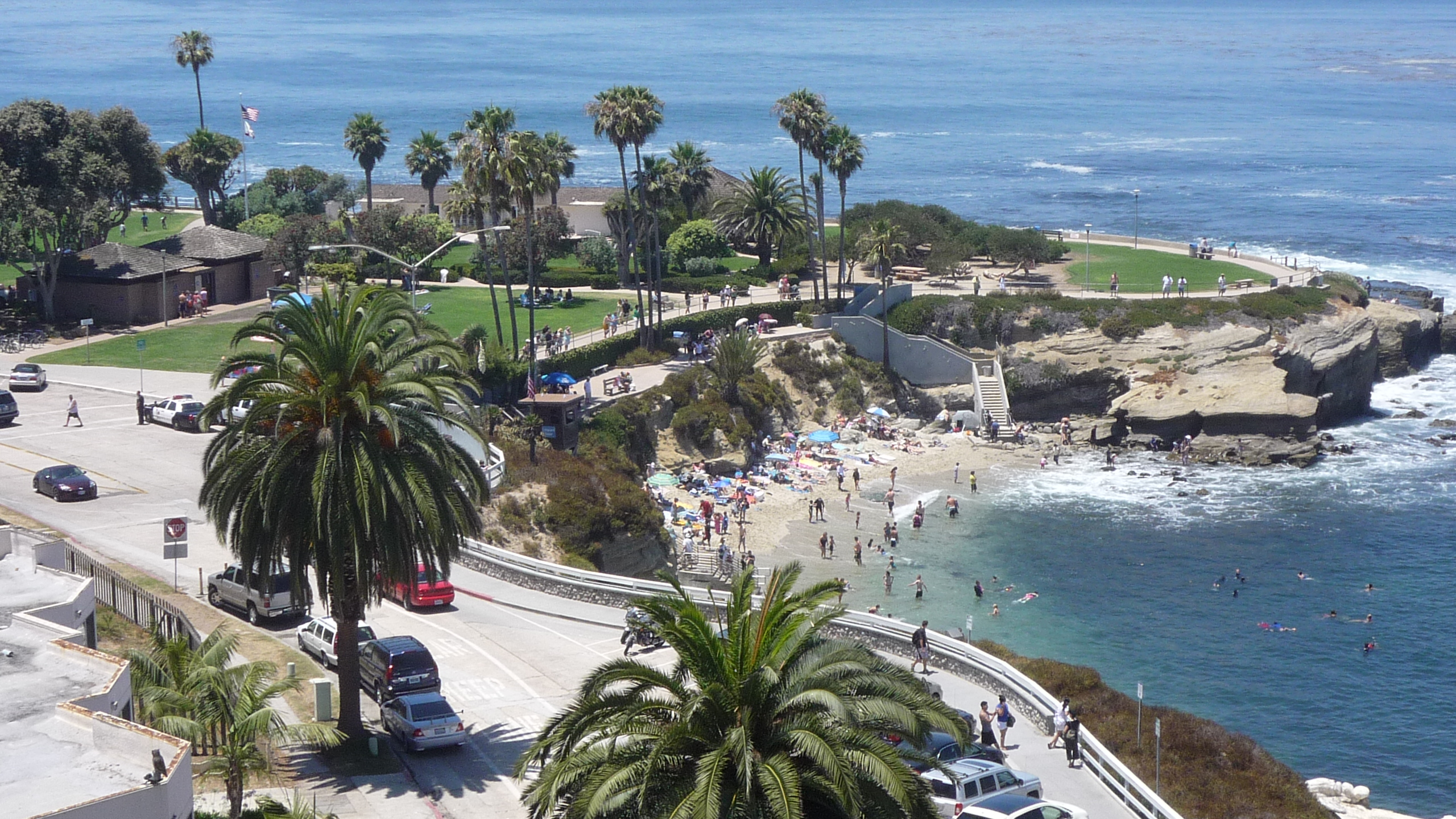
La Jolla Cove and Scripps Park, 2008

Ellen Browning Scripps Memorial Park, often referred to as Scripps Park, is an urban park in La Jolla, a community in San Diego, California. The park is sited on a sandstone bluff overlooking the Pacific Ocean. It is 5.6 acres (2.3 ha) and has approximately 1,500 ft (460 m) of shoreline and includes La Jolla Cove, Point La Jolla, Boomer Beach, and Shell Beach. The La Jolla Adult Recreation Center, three historic belvederes, and a pavilion are the only buildings in the park.

Influenced by the American picturesque park movement, Scripps Memorial Park has a 3.8-acre lawn and heritage plantings that include groves of gnarly trunked pink melaleuca (Melaleuca nesophila), an Australian native plant; exotic dragon trees (Dracaena draco) from the Canary Islands; several Monterey cypress (Hesperocyparis macrocarpa); and a row of Mexican fan palms (Washingtonia robusta).

According to the American Automobile Association (AAA), Scripps Memorial Park is the most photographed spot in San Diego. The La Jolla Park Coastal Historic District, listed on the National Register of Historic Places on May 9, 2024, includes Ellen Browning Scripps Memorial Park as a contributing resource.

== History ==
=== Pre-1887 ===
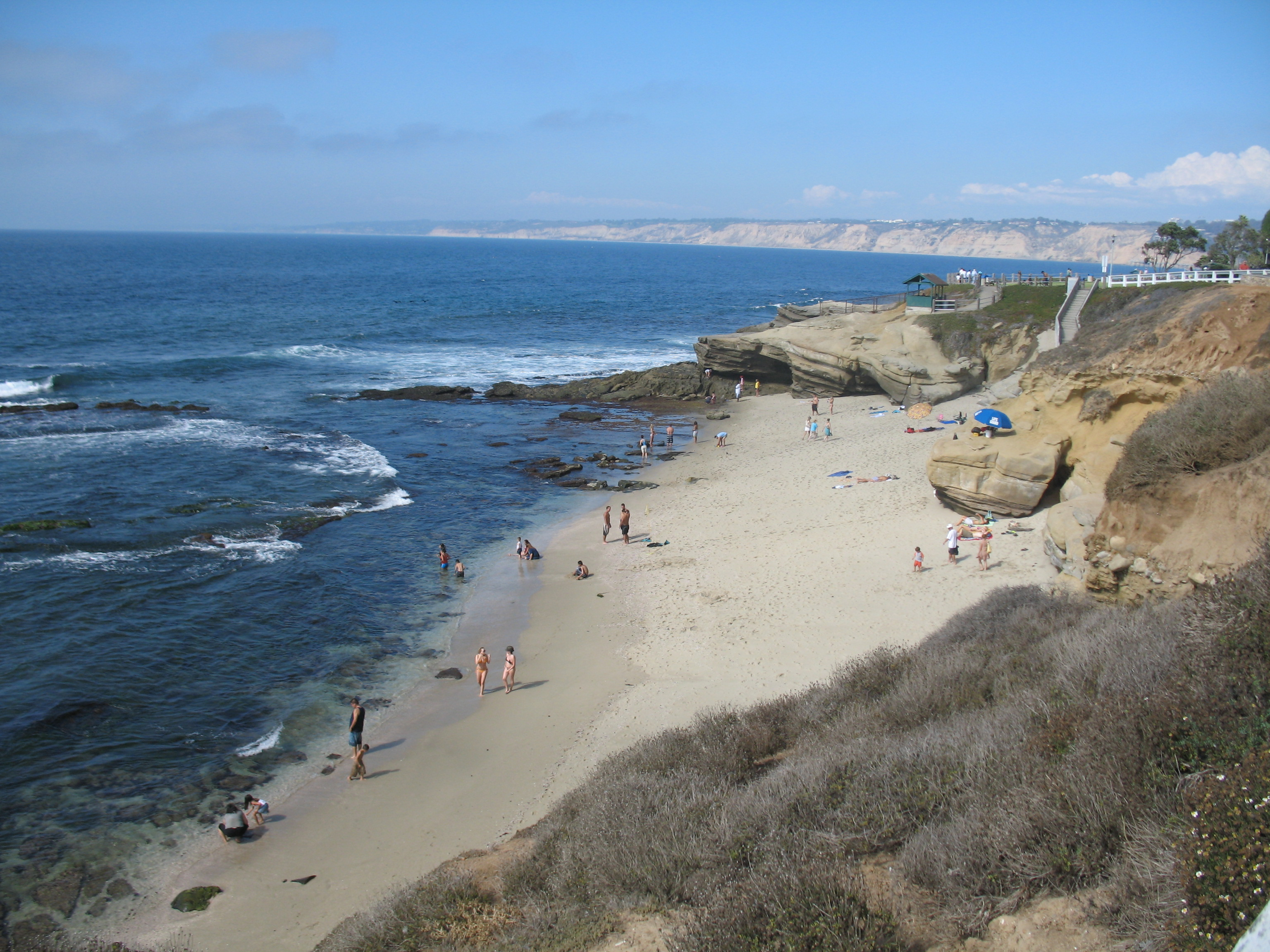
Shell Beach, 2007

La Jolla was the location of a large habitation area known to early Kumeyaay inhabitants as Mut kula xuy (place of many caves). Spindrift, also called the La Jolla Complex, encompasses the parcel of coastal land along La Jolla Shores down to La Jolla Cove. The area is rich in archaeological sources.

Point La Jolla, a rocky point jutting out from the region's generally smooth and dangerous lee shore, had special significance to the Kumeyaay, who continue to refer to the area as the "Holy Land." It is a site like Point Conception, a headland in Santa Barbara County that is said to be sacred to the Chumash people, the “Western Gate” through which the souls of the dead could pass between the moral world and the heavenly realm. The Acjachemen similarly may have attached significance to Dana Point.

=== 1887-1920 ===
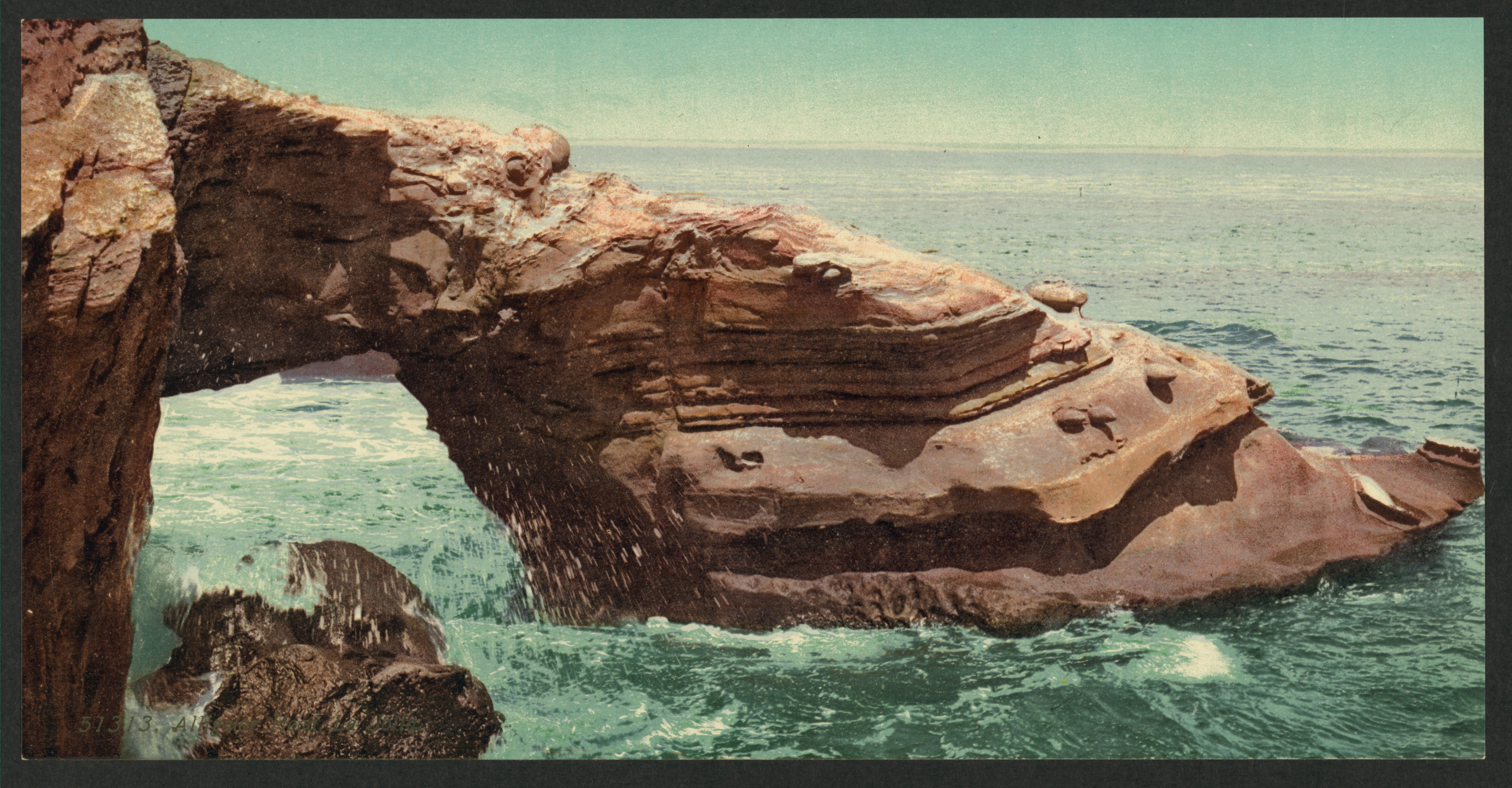
Postcard, ca. 1900, showing Alligator Head at La Jolla Cove

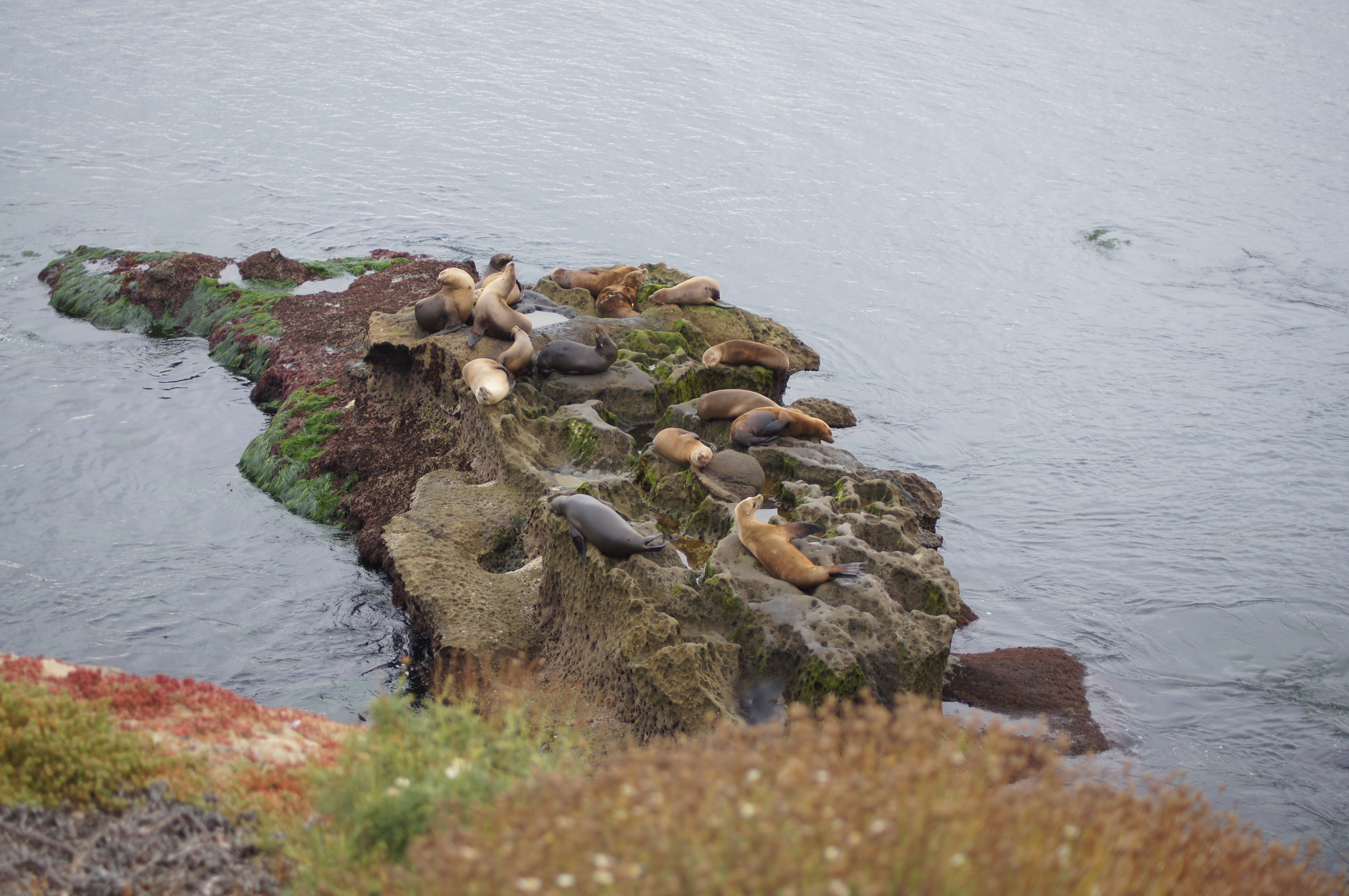
Sea Lions at Alligator Head, La Jolla Cove, 2019

In the mid-1880s, the anticipated arrival of the Southern Pacific and Santa Fe Railroads led to a real estate boom along the Southern California Coast. La Jolla, a remote area best known for its natural scenery, was targeted by developers for the construction of tourist facilities and residential housing.

La Jolla Park, now Ellen Browning Scripps Memorial Park, was set aside by developer Frank T. Botsford as the focal point for the creation of the 1887 subdivision, La Jolla Park. Located close to La Jolla's sea-level caves, the park offered access to the sheltered La Jolla Cove and views of the sea arches and other rock formations along the coast. On the La Jolla plat map, the park was linked to the main commercial street, Girard Ave., so that residents and visitors could easily access the coast. It came under the jurisdiction of the San Diego Parks Commission in 1903.

In 1894, the San Diego, Pacific Beach, and La Jolla Railroad financed the construction of a pavilion in the park to serve as an entertainment center where people could hold meetings, listen to music, and play cards. Swing sets and a bathhouse were also constructed, courtesy of the railroad, and sited at Point La Jolla, just above the Cove. The railroad also established a Tent City in the park. Visitors camped along the shore, often for weeks at a time.

Summer homes such as the Red Rest and Red Roost Cottages began to be built on the cliffs overlooking the park.

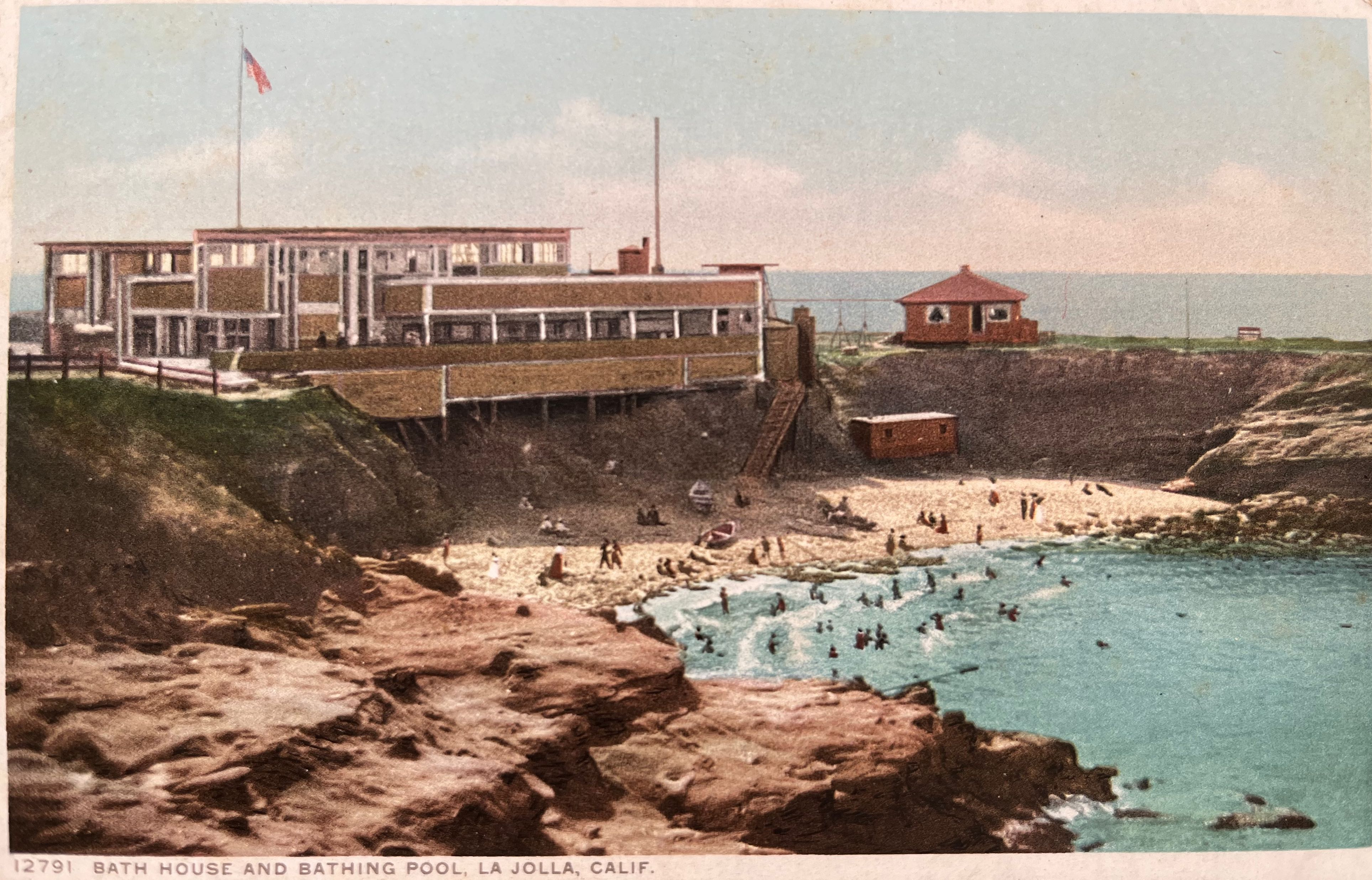
Postcard, ca. 1906-08, showing the bathhouse at La Jolla Cove (left) and the Marine Biological Laboratory (right)

The La Jolla Improvement Society, like other similar organizations nationwide, made efforts to beautify the park with landscaping and belvederes perched over the cliffs. After the bathhouse burned down in 1905, the pavilion was dismantled, the swing set removed, and tent living discouraged.

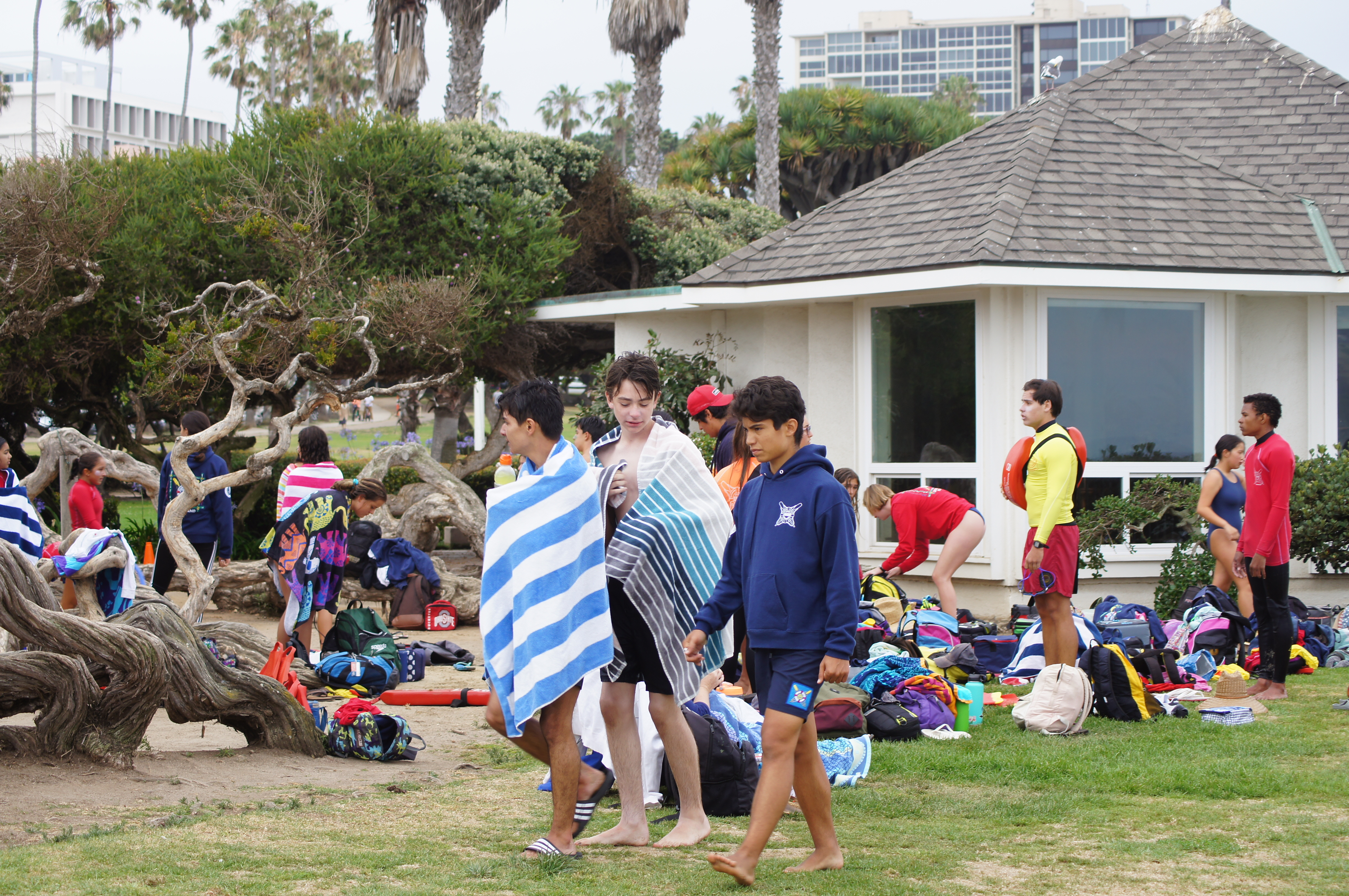
Junior Lifeguards training at Scripps Park, 2019

In early 1905, the Marine Biological Laboratory headed by Dr. William Ritter built a small laboratory in La Jolla Park, just above the Cove. Known as the “Little Green Laboratory,” it offered public lectures and an aquarium. La Jolla Submarine Canyon's southern branch, later the Matlahuayl State Marine Reserve, had reefs and a kelp forest teeming with leopard sharks, garibaldi, lobster, and octopus. The laboratory, now Scripps Institution of Oceanography, moved to La Jolla Shores in 1910.

In 1906, a larger bathhouse was built with a bowling alley, café, dressing rooms, and lockers. A wooden stairway provided access to the cove. When this structure became dilapidated in the 1920s, residents defeated a proposal to build a second one. In the early 1930s, they shot down a proposal to build a breakwater and yacht harbor around La Jolla Cove.

=== 1920-1945 ===
La Jolla Park was renamed Ellen Browning Scripps Memorial Park in 1927 to honor the philanthropist Ellen Browning Scripps's many gifts to San Diego. Scripps contributed financially to many improvement projects in the coastal area.

In 1939, at the end of the Great Depression, the park became the site of the Adult Recreation Center built with the support of the Works Progress Administration. During World War II, the park hosted thousands of service men stationed at nearby Camp Kearny and Camp Callan.

=== 1945-present ===
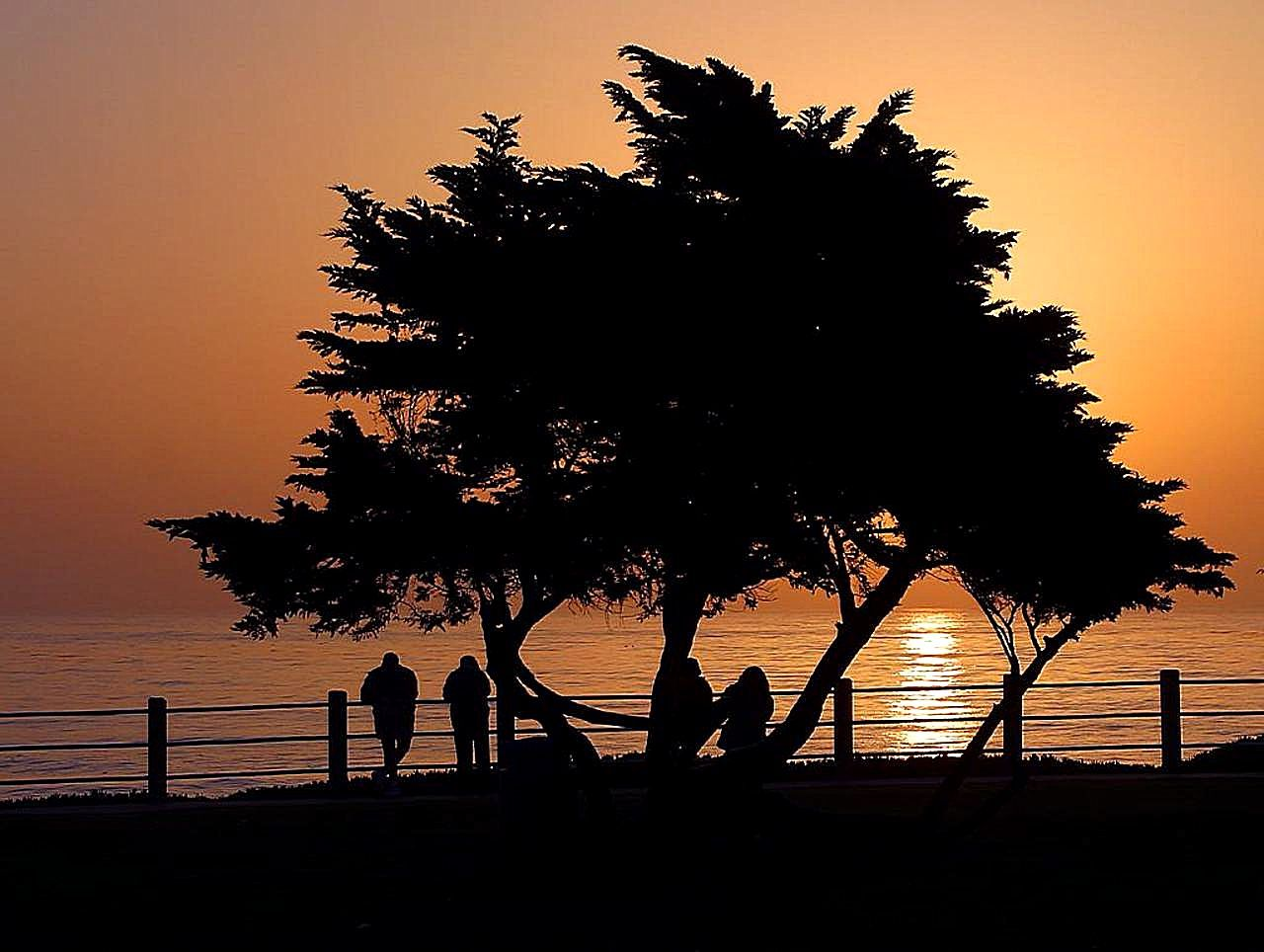
Sunset, Scripps Park

La Jolla grew rapidly after World War II, from 7,700 residents in 1946 to over 25,000 in 1970. The founding of the University of California, San Diego bolstered the area's growth. By 1999, the population had swelled to nearly 31,000. Tourism, meanwhile, increased dramatically.

In the 1960s and 1970s, efforts were made to preserve La Jolla's coastline and marine life. The San Diego-La Jolla Underwater Park was founded in 1970, followed by the San Diego-Scripps Coastal Marine Conservation Area and the Matlahuayl State Marine Reserve in 1999. The environmental impact of population growth and tourism on Scripps Memorial Park and adjacent coastal areas led to the 2001 establishment of the Scripps Park Project which produced a draft historical context and cultural landscape report. The City of San Diego adopted a Parks Master Plan in August 2021.

The park has served as a meeting place for myriad events. In 1965, Scripps Park hosted a community-wide protest in response to the construction of several high-rises on Coast Blvd., opposite the park. Since 2004, the park has been the site of the La Jolla Concours d’Elegance, a prestigious car show.

Vendors were allowed to operate in Scripps Memorial Park in 1984, following a decision by the San Diego Park and Recreation Department staff to allow push-cart vendors in several city parks. After causing considerable controversy, this decision was reversed in 2022 and a loophole was closed in 2024. Councilman Joe La Cava stated, “The Wild West of unregulated activities will soon be behind us.”

== Landscape ==
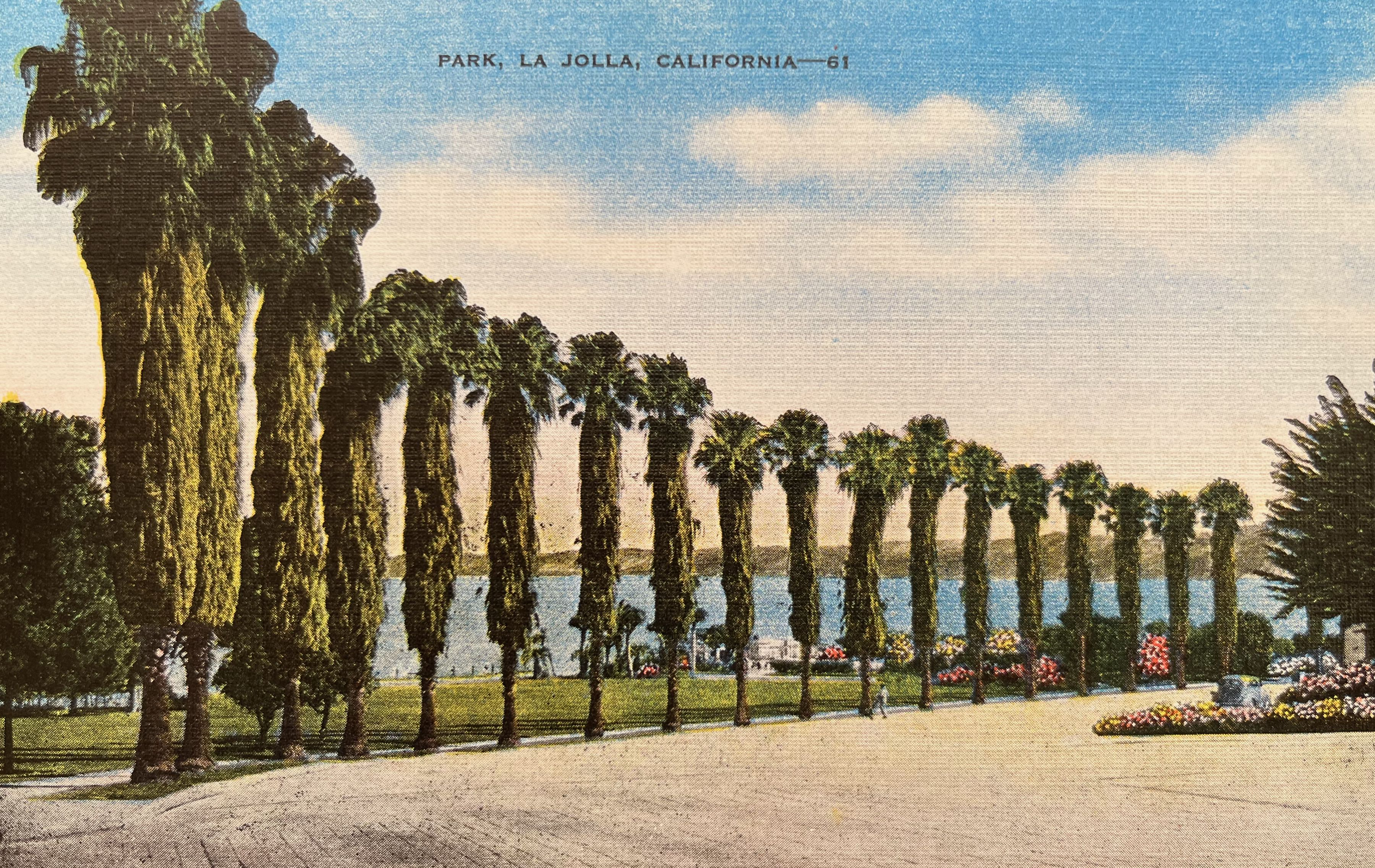
Postcard showing iconic palm trees, Scripps Memorial Park, ca. 1929

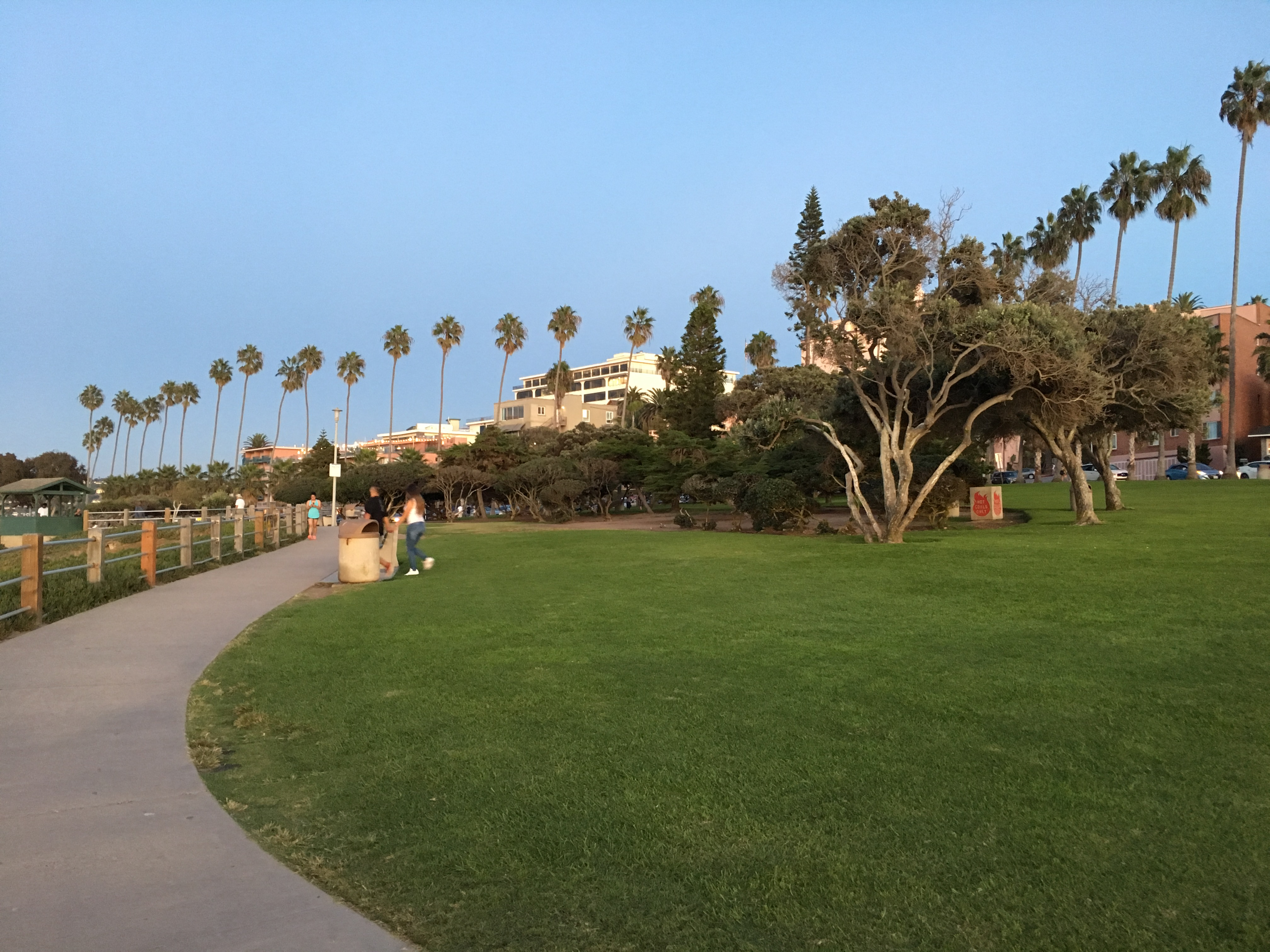
Scripps Memorial Park, 2017

Scripps Memorial Park was inspired by the late nineteenth-century American picturesque park movement, borrowed from English landscape traditions. Curving paths through the park mirror organic patterns found in nature and lead walkers along the edge of the coastal bluff. The lawn, sloping downward to the cliff face, is encircled by a concrete path lined with benches.

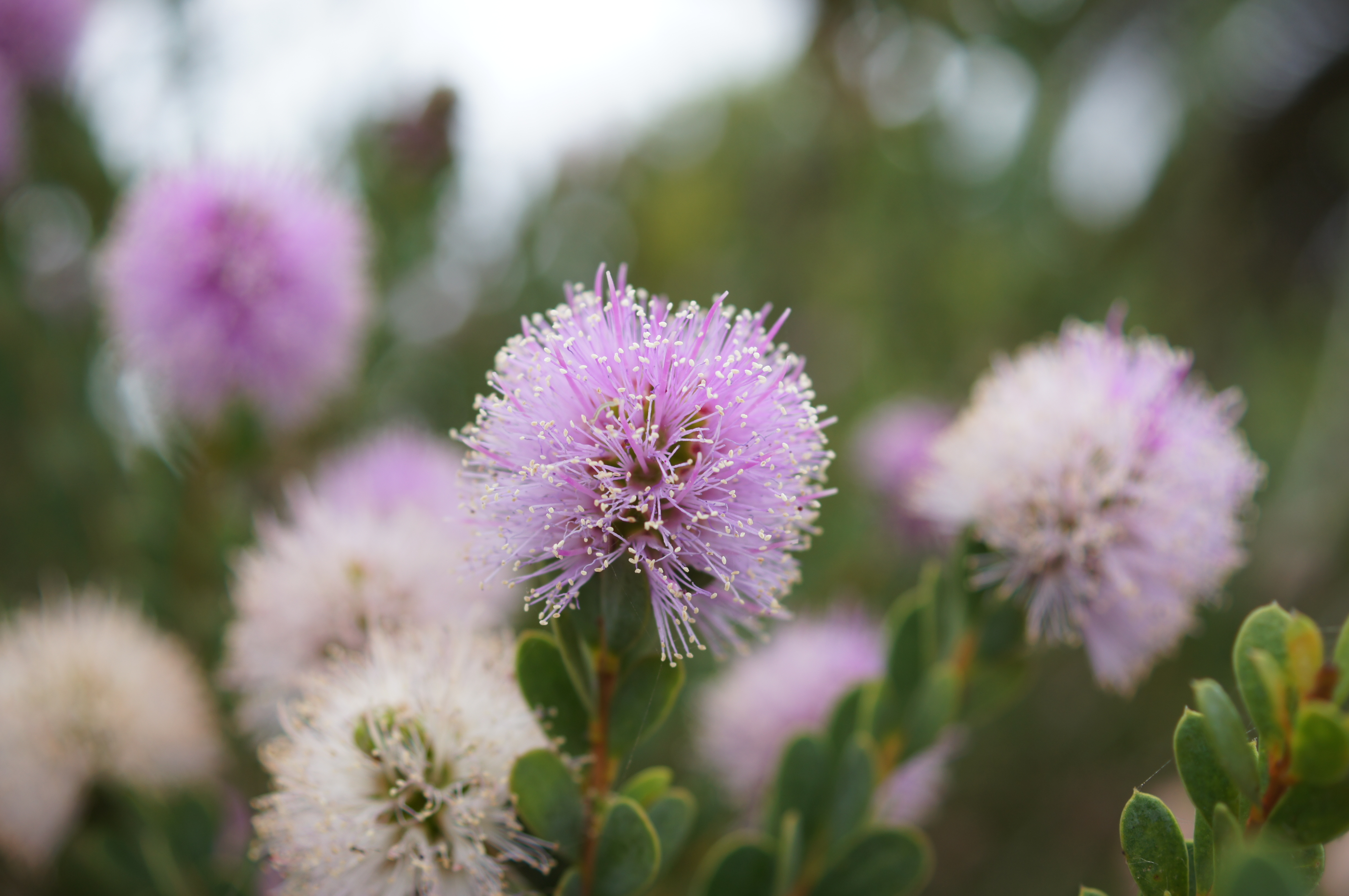
Pink melaleuca (Melaleuca nesophila), Scripps Park

Horticulturalist Kate Sessions recommended landscape features and plantings, notably palm trees. The park’s roadside edge is lined with Mexican fan palms (Washingtonia robusta) originally planted by La Jolla resident Walter Lieber in 1910.

Coast Boulevard, located on the southern edge of the park, is a curvilinear promenade and scenic drive identified on the 1887 map of La Jolla Park subdivision. In 1908, it was graded, paved, and landscaped according to a plan by English landscape designer George Cooke, San Diego's first park superintendent. Cooke came to San Diego in 1904 with Samuel B. Parsons Jr, founder of the American Society of Landscape Architects.

The park landscape includes a 3.8-acre lawn, trees, shrubs, ground covers, and succulents. Some are exotics while others are plants common to the Southern California coast. They include groves of gnarly trunked pink melaleuca (Melaleuca nesophila), an Australian native plant; exotic dragon trees (Dracaena draco) from the Canary Islands; several Monterey cypresses (Cupressus macrocarpa); a Cook pine (Araucaria columnaris); an Aleppo pine (Pinus halepensis); pohutukawa (Metrosideros excelsa), often called the New Zealand Christmas tree; karo (Pittosporum tobira); and a row of Mexican fan palms (Washingtonia robusta). In recent years, a number of huge, one hundred-year-old, Canary Island date palms (Phoenix canariensis) have died due to the South American palm weevil (Rhynchophorus palmarum).

Ground covers including several varieties of ice plant (Mesembryanthemum crystallinum) and sea fig (Carpobrotus edulis) spread over adjoining beach cliffs, creating carpets of red, pinks and purples through the spring and early summer. Sea lavender (Limonium perezii) also grows profusely in these areas. Among succulents present within the park are the century plant (Agave americana) and the foxtail agave (Agave attenuata). About eighty-five percent of the park is covered in grassy areas for picnics, sunbathing, or sporting activities. The grass is the hardy coastal variety known as Kikuyu grass (Cenchrus clandestinus).

== Geological and natural features ==
=== The Cove Beach ===
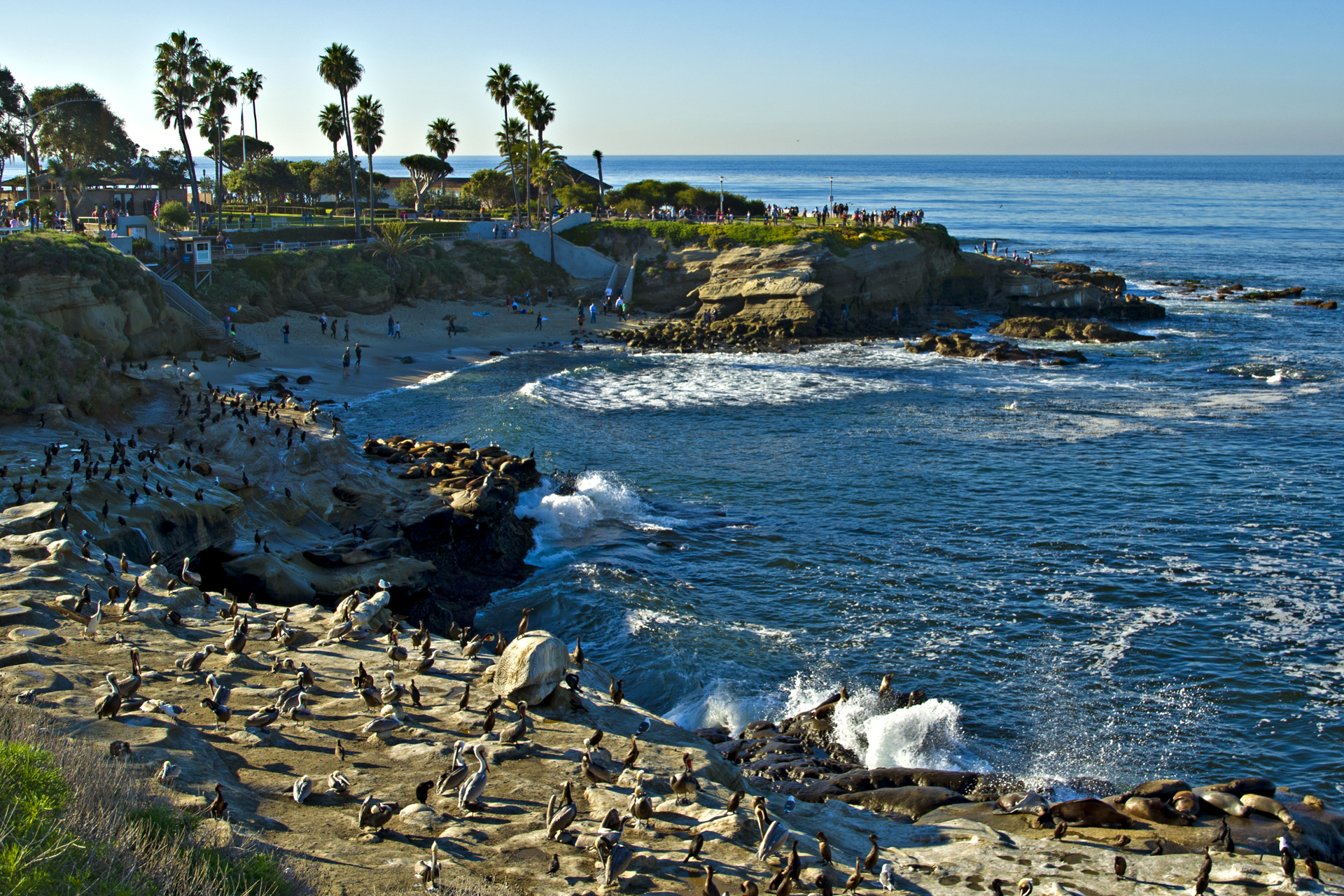
La Jolla Cove

The Cove Beach is adjacent to La Jolla Cove, the San Diego-Scripps Coastal Marine Conservation Area, and the Matlahuayl State Marine Reserve. Stairs at the northern end of Ellen Browning Scripps Park provide access to the beach, a popular site for swimming, diving, and engaging with marine life. The Cove Beach is the starting point for the historic Rough Water Swim, now known as The La Jolla Cove Swim, which began in 1916 and has been held annually, with a few exceptions, since 1931.

=== Boomer Beach ===
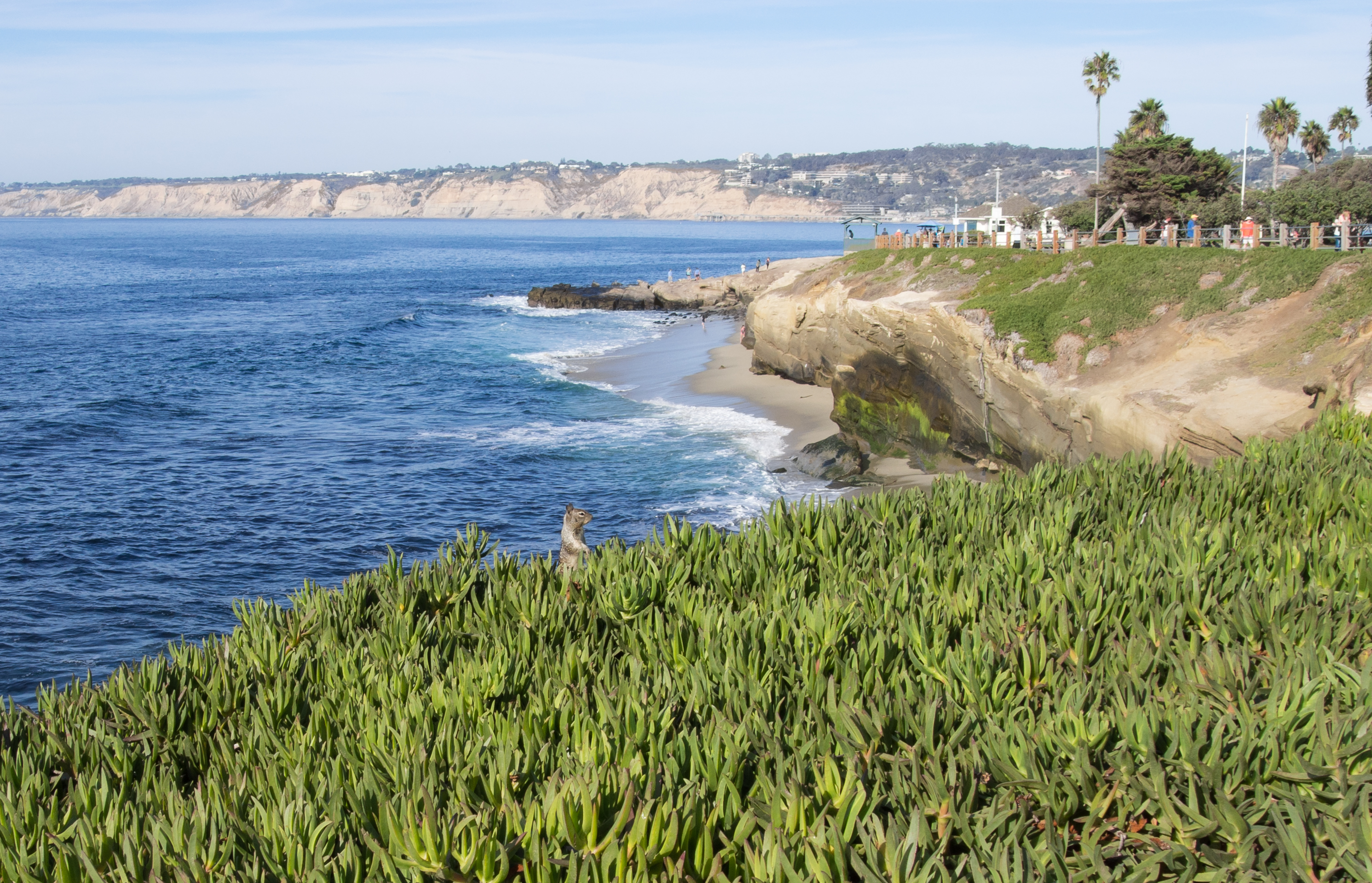
Boomer Beach, La Jolla

Boomer Beach, located below the bluff adjacent to the Adult Recreation Center, was a popular site for shell collecting, body surfing, and diving. Two belvederes are located directly above the beach. In 2023, the San Diego City Council approved a year-round closure of Boomer Beach for seven years to separate people from a sea lion rookery.

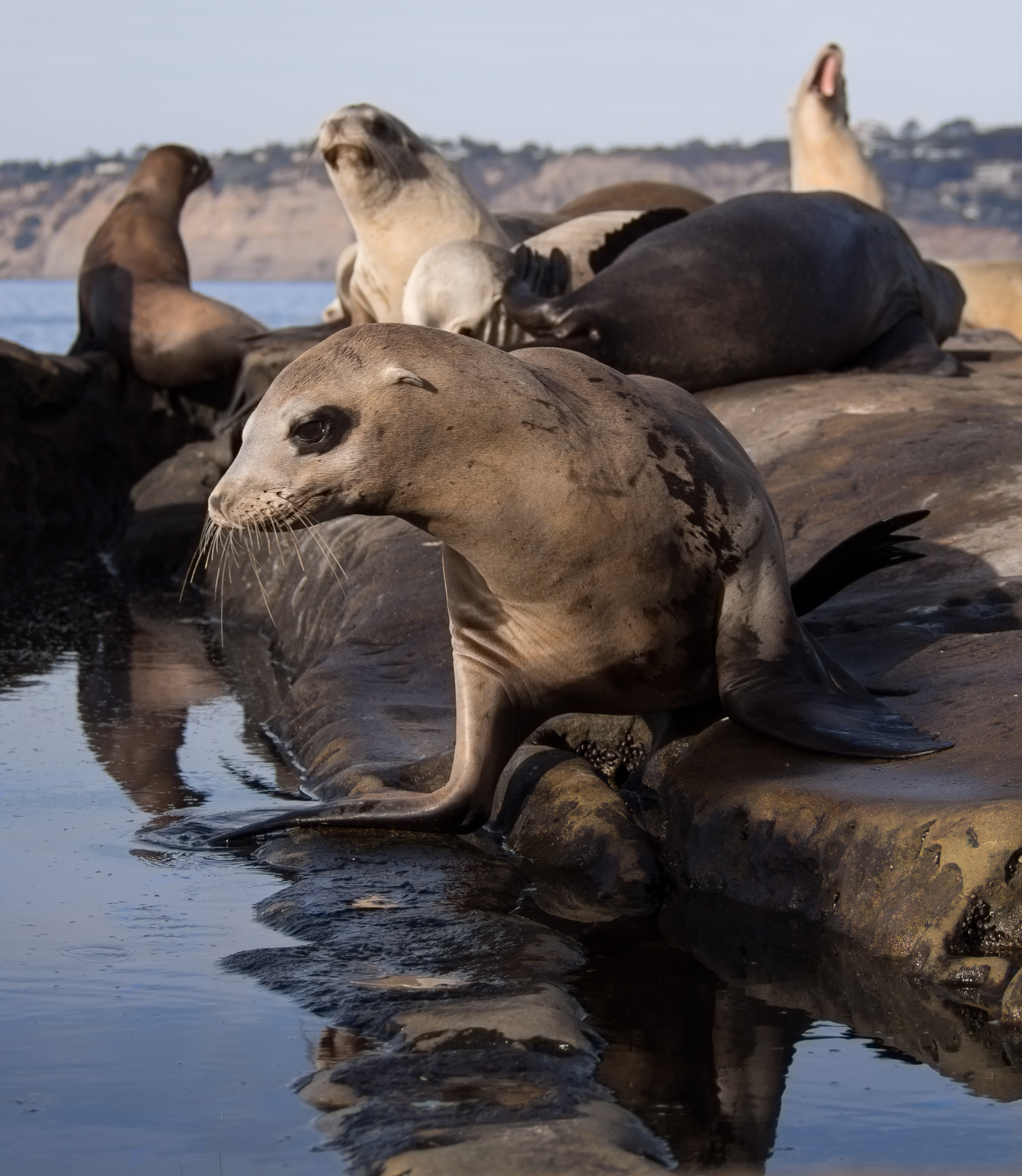
Sea lion, La Jolla, 2016

=== Point La Jolla ===
Point La Jolla is a rocky point jutting out from the region's generally smooth and dangerous lee shore. A navigational marker, it played a significant role in California's maritime history by offering a protected anchorage from southern storms. Geographically, it helped create the protected waters of the San Diego-Scripps Coastal Marine Conservation Area, and the Matlahuayl State Marine Reserve. Historically, people fished from the point and used it as a base for snorkeling. In 2023, the San Diego City Council approved a year-round closure of Point La Jolla for seven years to separate people from a sea lion rookery.

=== Shell Beach ===
Shell Beach, located at the south end of Ellen Browning Scripps Park, was rich with marine creatures and shells, readily visible in rocky tidepool formations when waves were out. In the early twentieth century, marine biologists and amateur collectors gathered algae, sea mosses, and mollusks. Among them was marine biologist Mary Snyder (d. 1926) and Dr. Fred Baker, a malacologist instrumental in the founding of the Scripps Institution of Oceanography.

== Built environment ==
=== La Jolla Adult Recreation Center ===
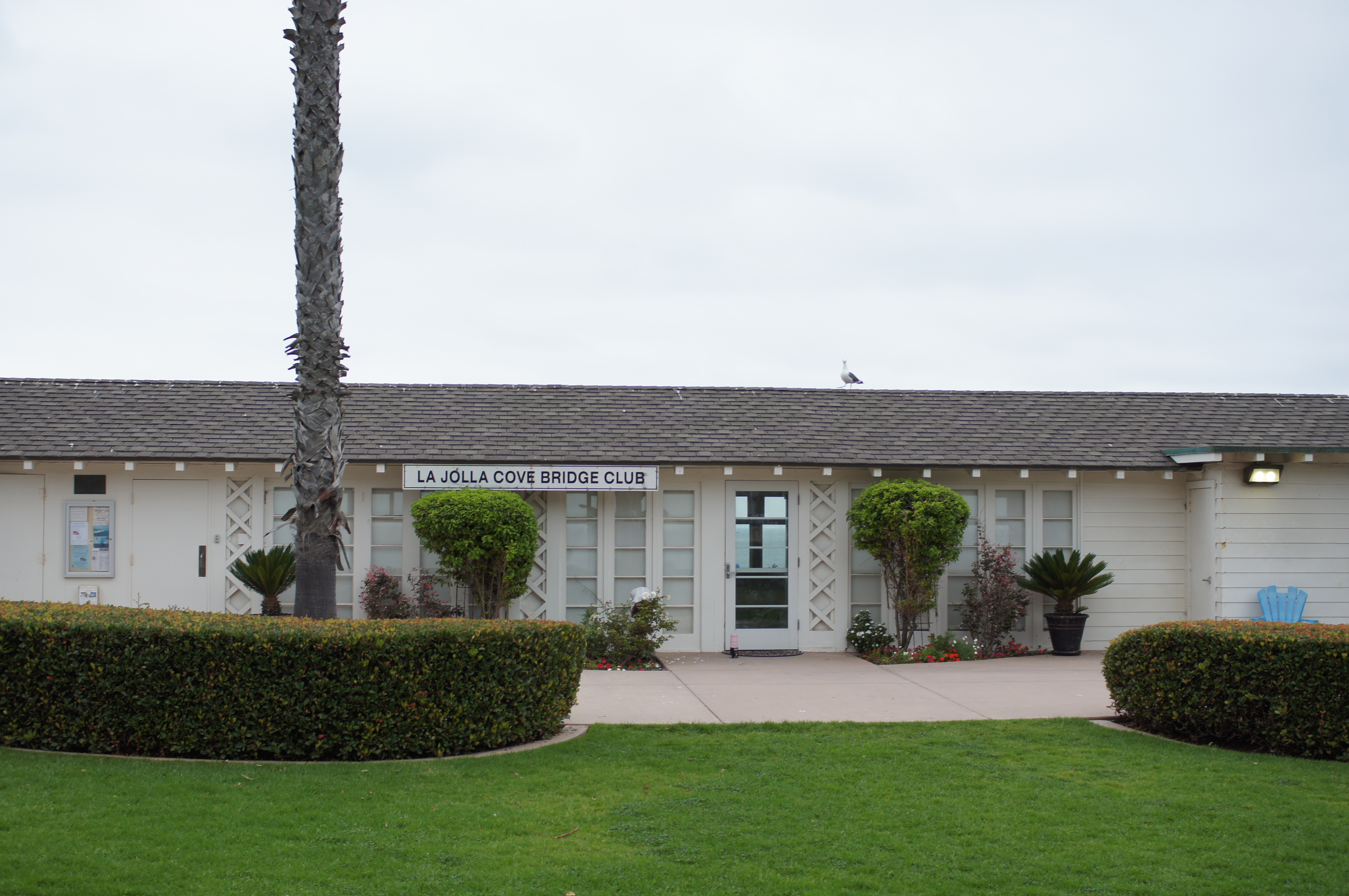
La Jolla Cove Bridge Club, 2022

The Adult Recreation Center, 1160 Coast Blvd., is a one-story building located on a promontory at the northern end of Ellen Browning Scripps Park. The original building was constructed in 1939, during the Great Depression, for the La Jolla Shuffleboard Club. Designed by architect Richard S. Requa, it was funded by the La Jolla Chamber of Commerce and built by the Works Progress Administration.

The Adult Recreation Center was remodeled in the 1950s and 1960s to accommodate increased membership of the La Jolla Cove Shuffleboard and Bridge Club. Inspired by the popular California Ranch style, these alterations enlarged the building by fifty percent. The building was designated historic in 2009 by the City of San Diego Historical Resources Board.

The La Jolla Cove Shuffleboard and Bridge Club, now the La Jolla Cove Bridge Club, is a designated nonprofit 501(c)4 organization that welcomes members and visitors to play duplicate bridge. It rents the space for weddings and other events. Yoga classes and meetings of Alcoholics Anonymous also use the space.

=== Belvederes ===
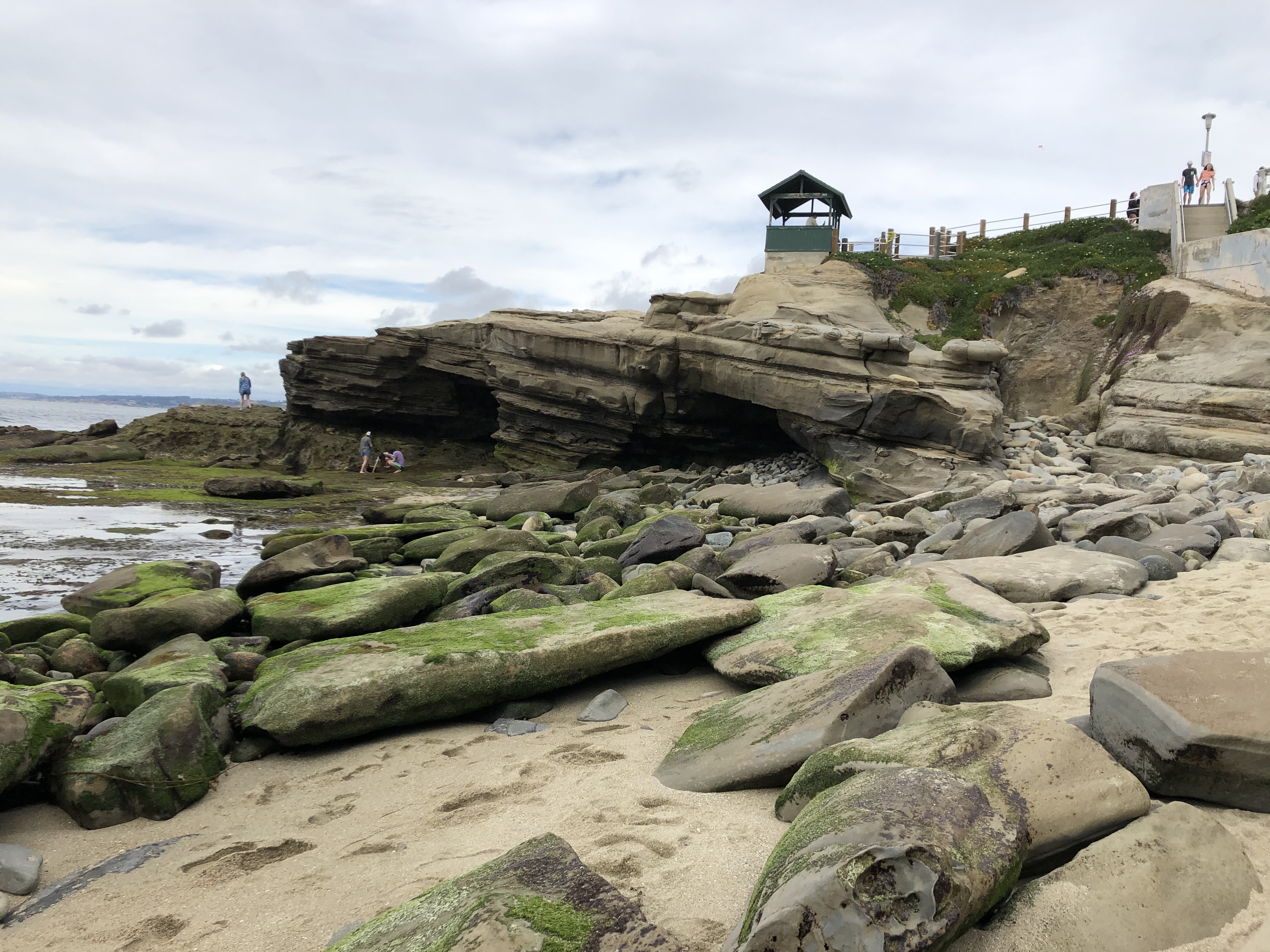
Belvedere at Scripps Park

Scripps Memorial Park contains three historic belvederes, small shelters constructed over the shoreline where people can view the scenery while remaining sheltered from the sun, wind, or rain.

Originally constructed between 1902 and 1908, the belvederes were built as part of the La Jolla Improvement Society's efforts to beautify the coastal area. The North Belvedere is located at the north end of Scripps Park, adjacent to the Adult Recreation Center, and the South Belvedere is at the southern end of Boomer Beach. The Shell Beach Belvedere at the southern end of the park provides a view to the beach, Seal Rock, and the Children's Pool to the south. A fourth belvedere (no longer existing) was built north of the park at Goldfish Point.

=== Comfort station ===
A comfort station has existed in the park for more than 50 years. The most recent structure was completed in 2022, designed by architects Mosher Drew.

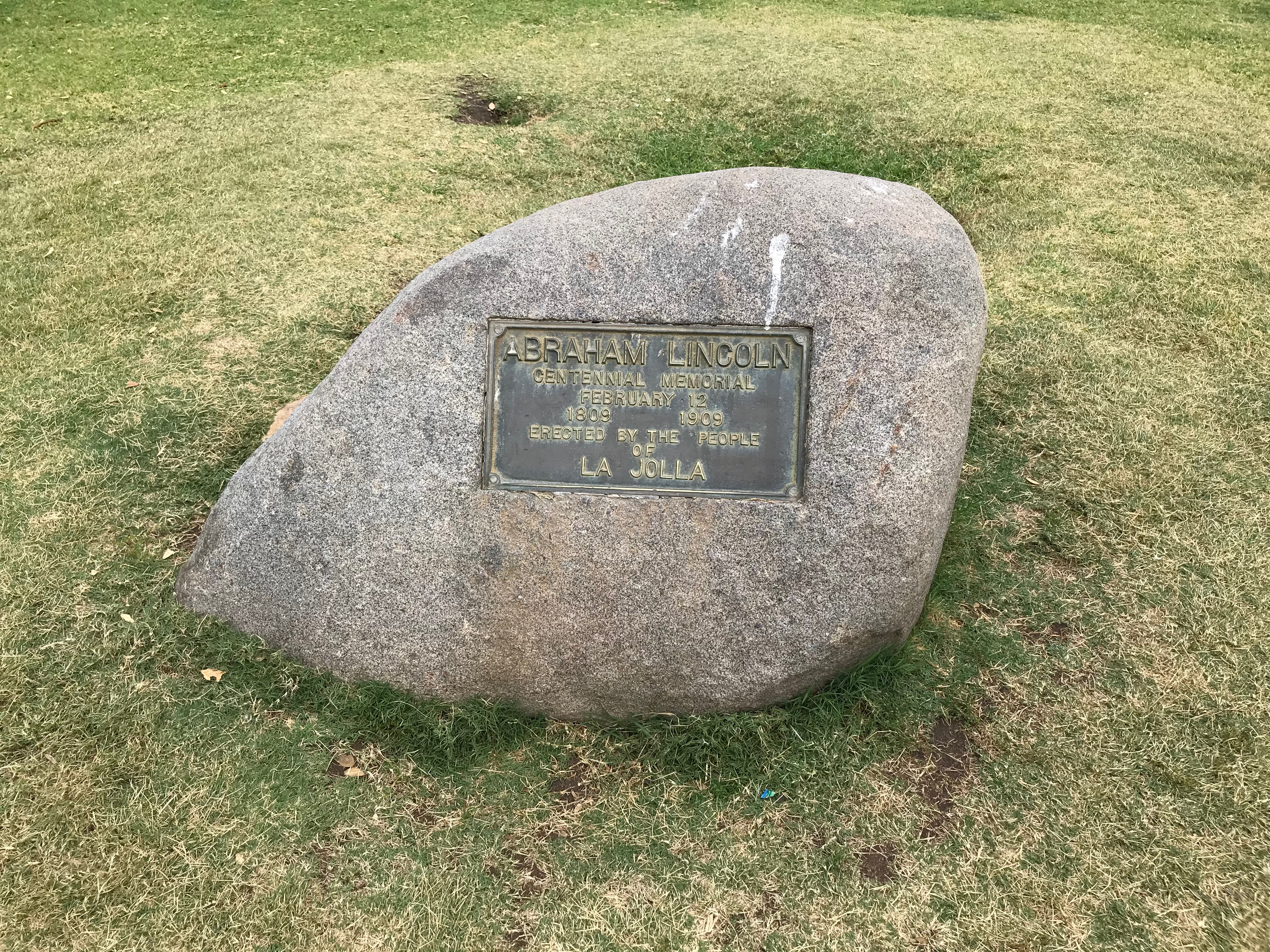
Lincoln Memorial Rock, 1909

There are many memorials located in the park. The oldest was dedicated to President Abraham Lincoln in 1909 and accompanied a flagstaff. In 1936, a bronze plaque was installed to honor Ellen Browning Scripps. It was later removed to the La Jolla Historical Society for safekeeping. Another memorial honors horticulturalist Kate Sessions.

== Commemorative markers ==
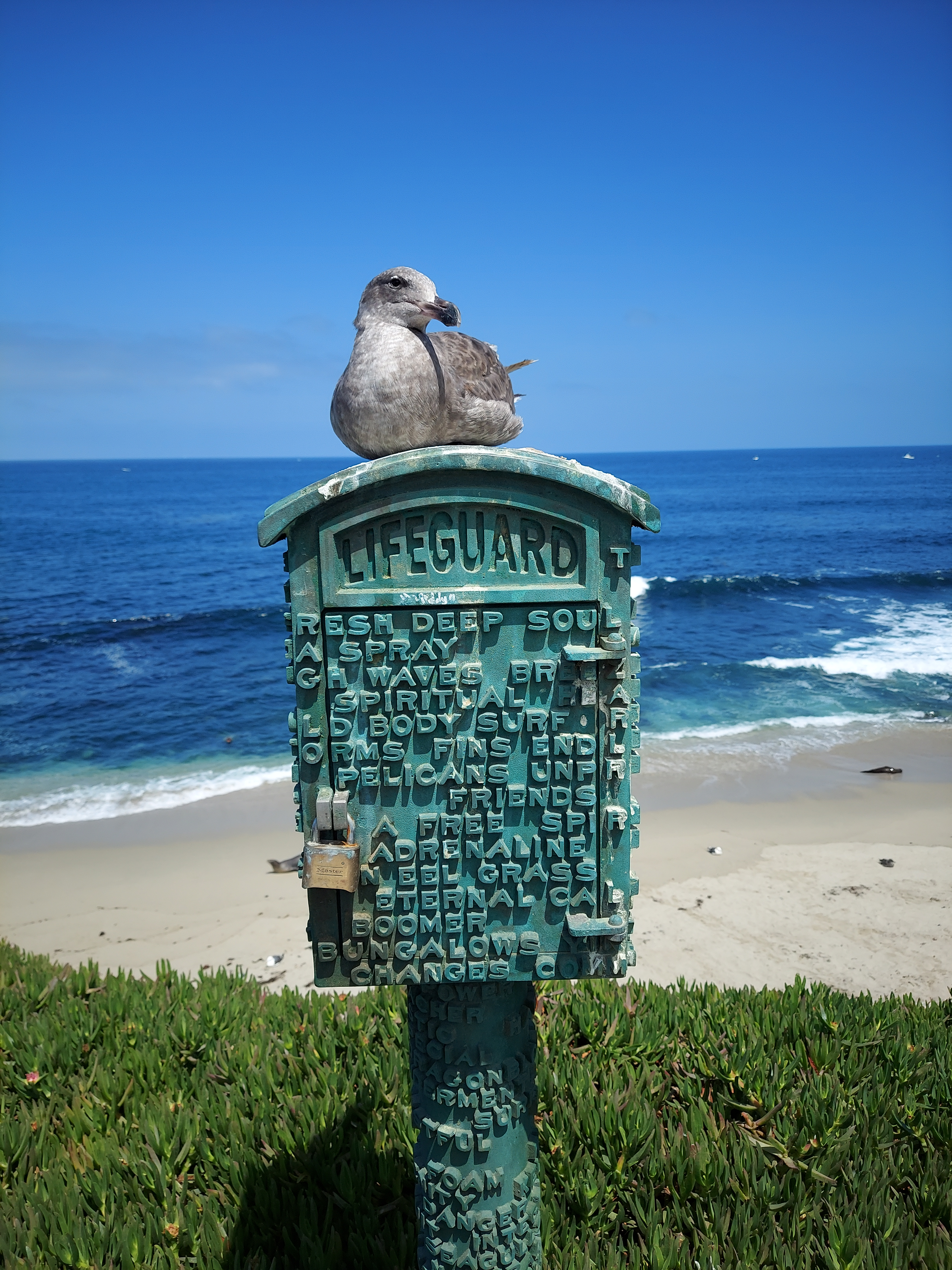
Commemorative Lifeguard Call Box

In 1995, a lifeguard call box in the park designed in bronze by artist Paul Sibel was added above Boomer Beach to honor a beloved waterman and body surfer, David C. Freeman. Benches with small commemorative plaques are located above the ocean bluffs.

In 2024, a memorial plaque honoring the Bottom Scratchers Dive Club, est. 1933, was installed in the park. The club played a major role in helping to establish La Jolla's marine reserve.

== See also ==
- Google Arts & Culture: La Jolla's Coastal Legacy
- Ellen Browning Scripps Park, The Cultural Landscape Foundation
- Ellen Browning Scripps, San Diego Parks & Recreation
- La Jolla Parks & Beaches
