= Red Rest and Red Roost Cottages =

Historic beach cottages

- Red Rest & Red Roost Cottages
- U.S. National Register of Historic Places
- San Diego Historic Landmark
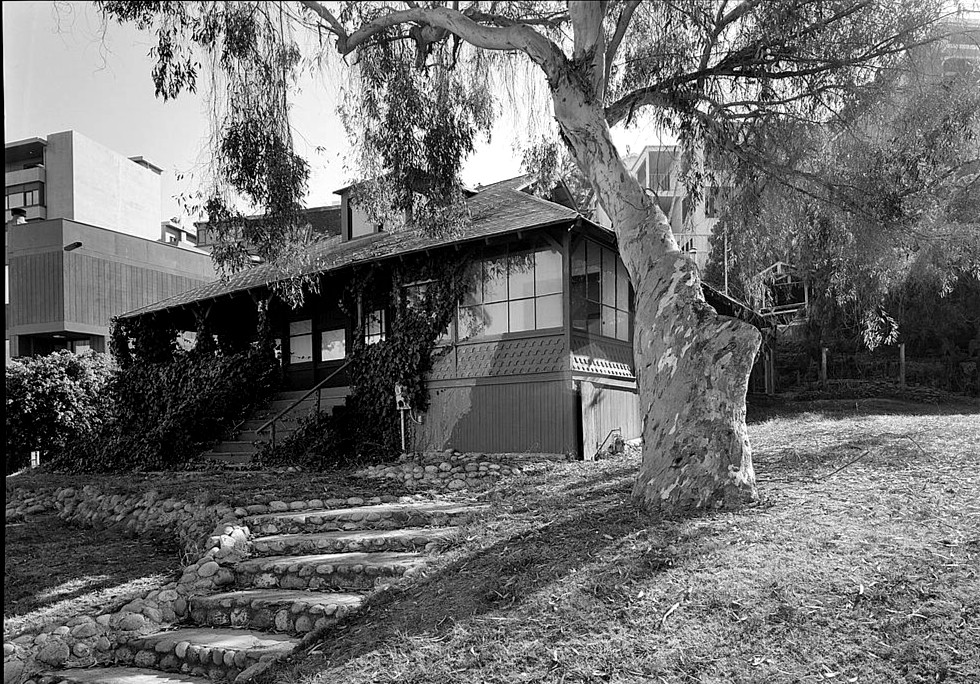
- Red Rest & Red Roost (Neptune) Cottages

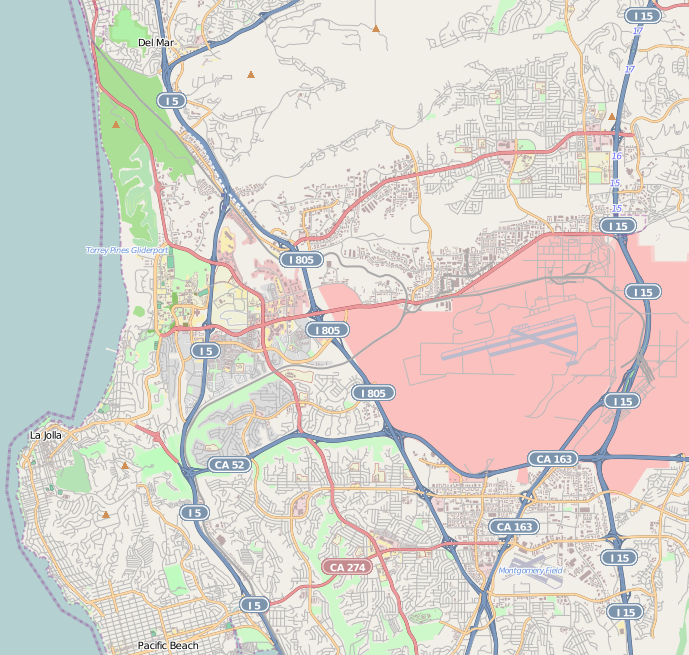
- Location within Northwestern San Diego Location within San Diego County, California Location within California Location within the United States
- Location: 1187 and 1179 Coast Blvd., La Jolla, California
- Coordinates: 32°50′59″N 117°16′21″W
- Built: 1894
- Architect: Unknown
- Architectural style: Historic beach cottage
- NRHP reference No.: 76002247
- SDHL No.: 101

Significant dates
- Added to NRHP: March 15, 1976
- Designated SDHL: January 3, 1975

The Red Rest and the Red Roost, built in 1894, are historic beach cottages overlooking La Jolla Cove in La Jolla, San Diego, California. At one time, they were prime examples of the first-generation California bungalow. Their placement on the National Register of Historic Places in 1976 has not prevented serious deterioration due to neglect.

The La Jolla Park Coastal Historic District, listed on the National Register of Historic Places on May 9, 2024, includes the Red Roost and the Red Rest as contributing resources.

== Location ==
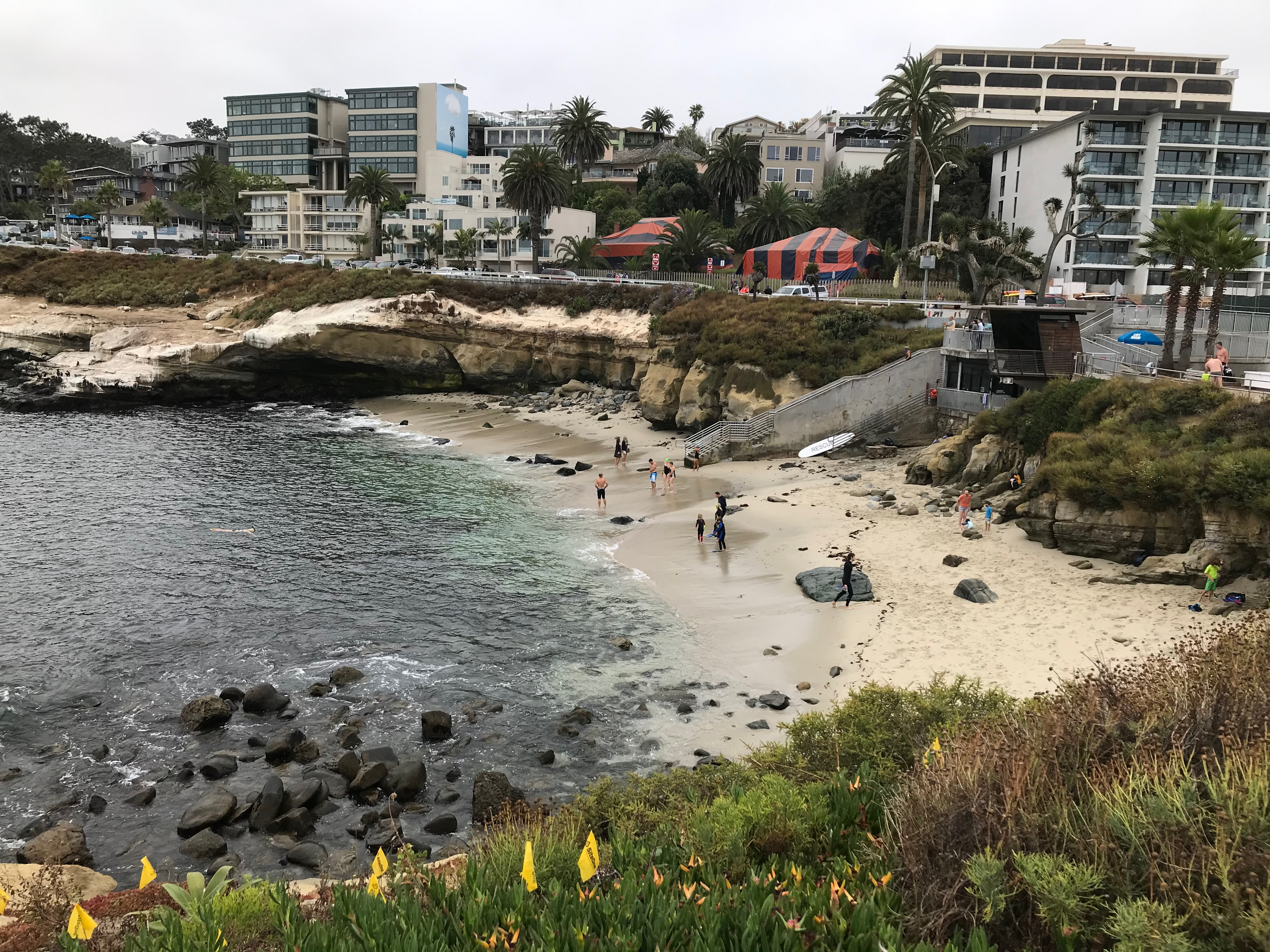
La Jolla Cove, 2020, showing Red Roost and Red Rest under striped tarps

The cottages are located along Coast Blvd., a curvilinear promenade and scenic drive that follows the La Jolla coastline. They occupy a site directly across the street from La Jolla Cove and the Matlahuayl State Marine Reserve.

The Red Rest, 1187 Coast Blvd. is located east of the Red Roost, 1179 Coast Blvd. They are situated between two tall, 30 feet (10 m), condominium buildings dating from 1974 to 2000.

== History ==
In the mid-1880s, the anticipated arrival of the Southern Pacific and Santa Fe Railroads led to a real estate boom along the Southern California Coast. La Jolla, a remote area best known for its natural scenery, was targeted by developers for the construction of tourist facilities and residential housing.

With the arrival of the San Diego, Pacific Beach, and La Jolla Railroad in 1894, La Jolla became a popular tourist destination that attracted visitors from the East, particularly during the winter months. Approximately one hundred homes were built between 1887 and 1900, most of them with names rather than street numbers. The population increased from zero in 1887 to 350 in 1900.

Many visitors to La Jolla came for what was referred to as the “nature cure.” Before the popularization of the germ theory of disease, people believed that climate played a significant role preventing or curing illness. The “nature cure” involved fresh air, sea-water bathing, and exercise. It also required houses with porches, large windows for air and sunlight, and good cross-ventilation. The California bungalow was developed as an architectural form that maximized the health benefits of the Southern California climate.

=== The Red Rest ===
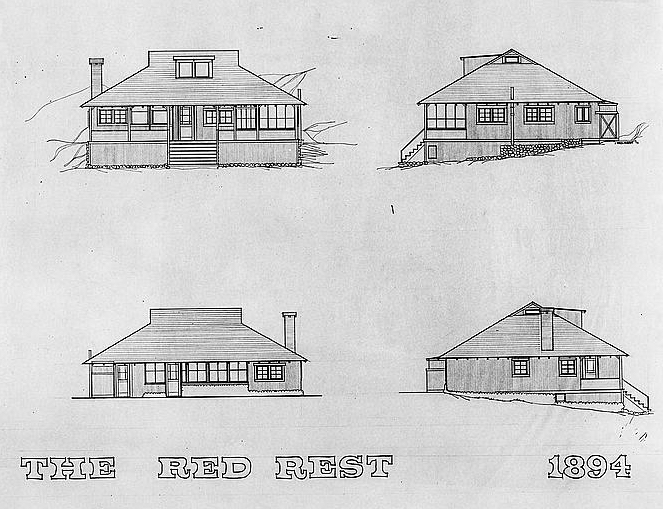
Red Rest Cottage, 1187 Coast Blvd, La Jolla

George J. Leovy (1858–1921), a New Orleans native and railroad lawyer, built the Red Rest as a summer house for his family. For several years, the family had camped in Scripps Park. The cottage was sold to Florence Sawyer, founder of the Reading Room, La Jolla's first library. She lived there for a brief period with her new husband John Ransome Bransby. It then became a rental property.

=== The Red Roost ===
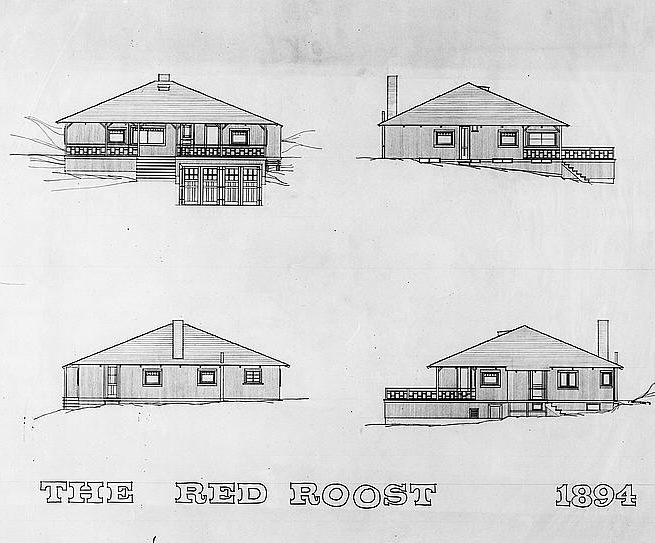
Red Roost (Neptune) Cottage, 1179 Coast Blvd, La Jolla

The Red Roost, originally known as Neptune, was built in 1894 for John E. Fishburn (1860–1929) who worked for the First National Bank of San Diego. In 1940, the Red Roost was briefly converted to the Cove Tea Room. Among the people who rented the property in the 1950s was a young Walter Munk of the Scripps Institution of Oceanography.

In 1977, tenants were evicted from both properties due to safety and liability concerns. The cottages have remained vacant for the last fifty years.

== Architecture ==
Built of old-growth redwood, the cottages are wood-framed, rectangular structures with hipped roofs and single-wall construction. The Red Rest has an enclosed porch that was added between 1894 and 1905. They are rare examples of early Arts & Crafts-era bungalows still on their original site.

Architects identify the Red Roost and the Red Rest as prototypes of the modern American vernacular house due to their simple tongue-and-groove, single-wall construction; wide veranda; and large windows. The cottages introduced concepts such as economy, simplicity, informality, and indoor-outdoor living that were taken up by a generation of modern architects, notably Bernard Maybeck, Frank Lloyd Wright, and Irving J. Gill.

Architect Eugene Ray described the bungalows as “a metaphor of the new spirited architecture that Louis Sullivan travelled all the way to California to see.” It produced “what we know as modern architecture in California today; an architecture that looked outward, to the sea, rather than inward.”

On October 26, 2020, a fire inside the Red Rest caused substantial damage. The buildings are partially covered with tarps. The owners are working with the City of San Diego Planning Department on rehabilitation of both cottages. Prior to the fire, the cottages were documented to Historic American Buildings Survey (HABS) standards and can be accurately repaired and/or reconstructed.

== Historic Designation ==
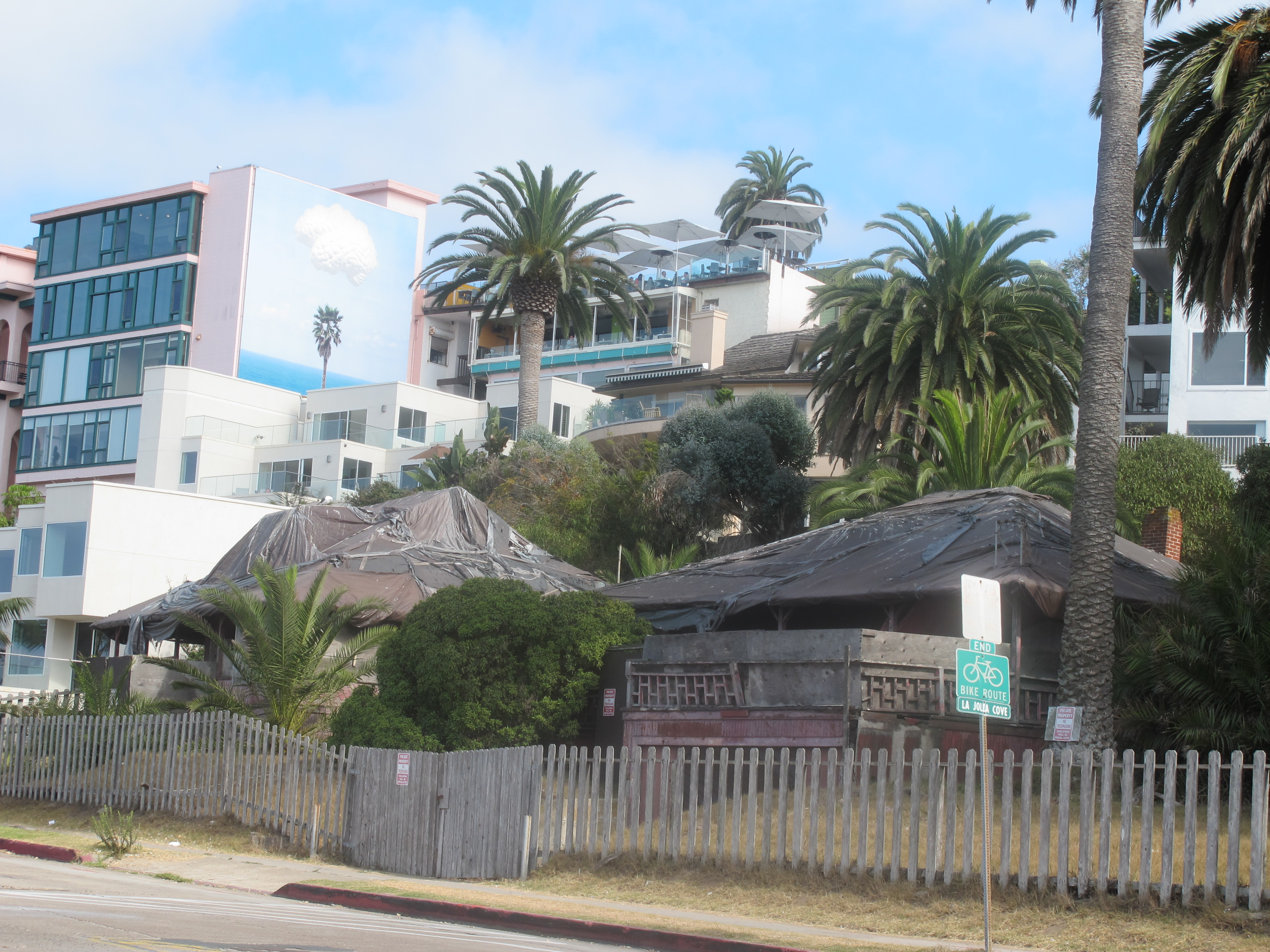
Red Roost and Red Rest Cottages, 2012

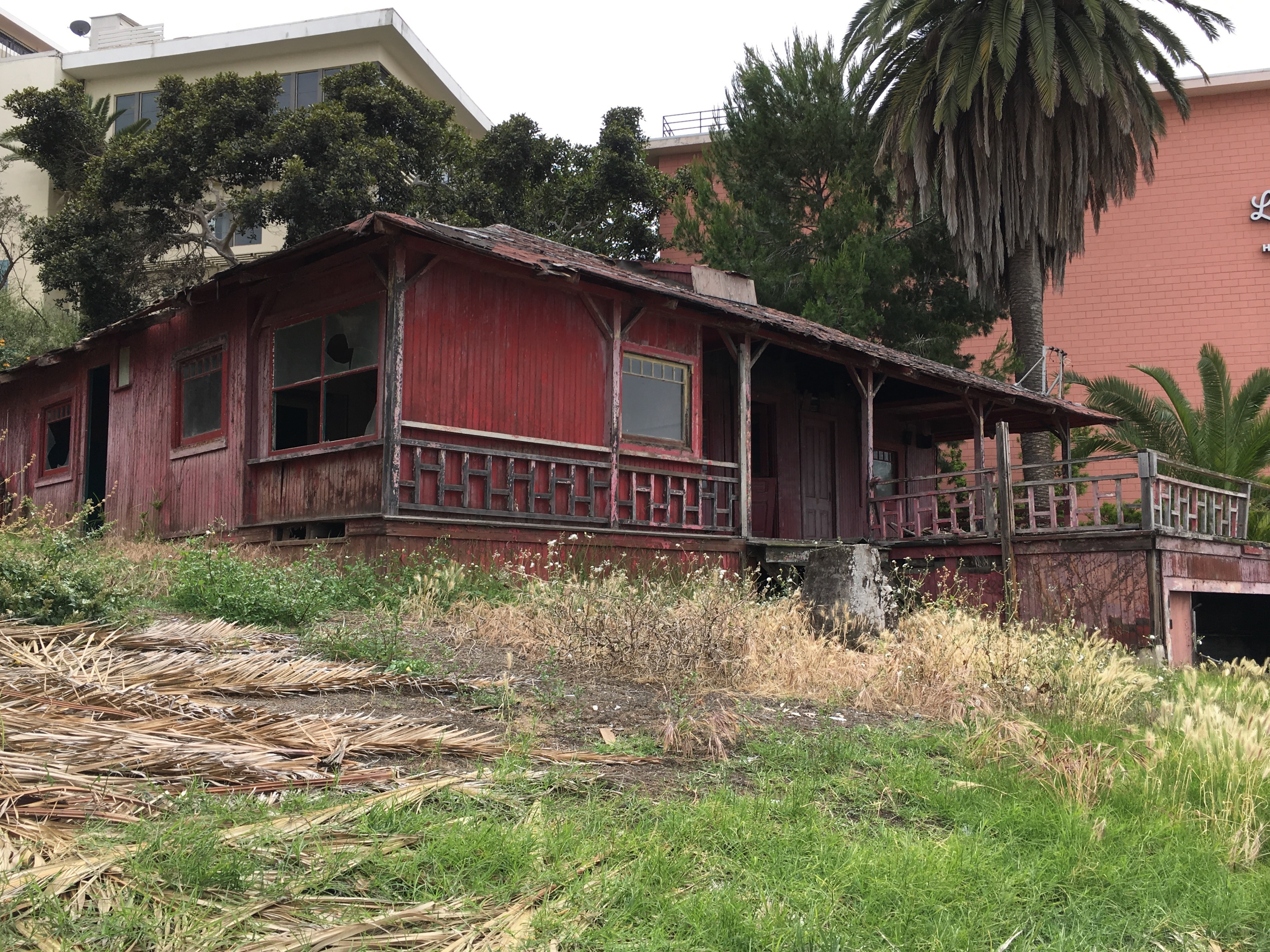
The Red Rest, 2019

The Red Roost and the Red Rest have been “the focus of heated debates over historic preservation and personal property rights.” Some see them as the important architectural sites that contribute to the historic character of La Jolla, while others see them as obstacles to commercial development.

In 1967, the Red Roost and the Red Rest were purchased by Jack Heimburge, president of the La Jolla Cove Apartment Motel and Hotel Apartments. He applied for a permit to demolish the two cottages to construct a three-story, seventeen-unit apartment building. His action was appealed by a local preservation group, Citizens Opposed to Violations of the Environment (C.O.V.E). The La Jolla Town Council voted to support the registration of the properties as historical sites to be purchased by the City of San Diego, added to Ellen Browning Scripps Memorial Park, and used as a visitor center. Heimburge, however, continued to fight for a development permit. In 1977, he issued eviction notices to the cottage tenants, citing liability concerns.

The structures were listed on the City of San Diego Register (HBRS 101) in 1975 and on the National Register of Historic Places (#76002247) in 1976. They sat, unoccupied, for the next forty years with little to no upkeep.

Sold in late 2014 to the Denver-based Apartment Investment and Management Co., a rehabilitation and reuse plan for the historically significant cottages began. In 2018, they were again sold to a group of investors in the hotel business. The City of San Diego stated that discretionary permits for the redevelopment of the property were still under review.

Save Our Heritage Organisation (SOHO) described the fight to save the two cottages as their longest-running preservation battle.

The Red Roost and the Red Rest are included as contributing resources in The La Jolla Park Coastal Historic District, listed on the National Register of Historic Places on May 9, 2024.

== See also ==
- Google Arts & Culture: La Jolla's Coastal Legacy
