= Hullabaloo =

Hullabaloo or hullaballoo may refer to:

== Film and television ==
- Hullabaloo (film), a 1940 American musical comedy
- Hullabaloo (TV series), a 1965–1966 American musical variety series
- Hullabaloo (British TV series), a 1963–1964 folk and blues music series

== Music ==
- Hullabaloo (festival), a music festival at the University of California San Diego
- Hullabaloo (rave), a former Canadian rave promotion company
- Hullabaloo (band), an American punk band
- The Hullaballoos, a British Invasion rock and roll band
- Hullabaloo (The Farm album), 1994
- Hullabaloo: Live at Le Zenith, Paris, a DVD by Muse, 2002
  - Hullabaloo Soundtrack, an album by Muse, 2002
- Hullabaloo, an album by Cerys Matthews, 2013
- Hullabaloo, an album from the Australian TV show Play School, 1999
- 'Hullabaloo" (song), by Absent Friends, 1990

== Other uses ==
- Tulane Hullabaloo, the student newspaper of Tulane University
- Hullabaloo, a political blog founded by Digby

== See also ==
- Brouhaha
- Protest (disambiguation)
- Commotion (disambiguation)
