= Procession (disambiguation) =

A procession is an organized body of people advancing in a formal or ceremonial manner.

Procession(s) may also refer to:

- Procession (album), a 1983 album by Weather Report
- Procession (band), an Australian pop/jazz band
- "Procession" (The Moody Blues song), 1971
- "Procession" (New Order song), 1981
- "Procession", opening track on Queen II album, 1974
- Procession (sculpture), a 1982 sculpture and mural in Eugene, Oregon, US
- Procession (film), a 2021 documentary directed by Robert Greene
- Processions (artwork), a mass participation artwork that took place in several British cities

== See also ==
- Procession of the Holy Spirit, in Christianity, a theological notion regarding the origin of the Holy Spirit
- Processional (disambiguation)
- Protest (disambiguation)
