= Eighth College =

Constituent residential college of UC San Diego

- University of California, San Diego
- Established: 2021
- Status: Undergraduate, Liberal Arts
- Colors: Eighth College Purple
- Provost: Angela Booker
- Core course: Critical Community Engagement (CCE)
- Residential Area: Theatre District Living & Learning Neighborhood
- Website: eighth.ucsd.edu

Eighth College is an undergraduate residential college at the University of California, San Diego.

The Eighth College opened for undergraduate students in the fall of 2023. The Eighth College Logo is purple with an "8" that is stylized to look like an infinity symbol.

== Curriculum ==
Eighth College has a core curriculum named "Critical Community Engagement". CCE consists of 4 courses, one being upper-division. The courses aim to prepare students to engage with the local San Diego community, as well as a broader global community with hands-on learning, involving an interaction-based course.

== Residential life ==
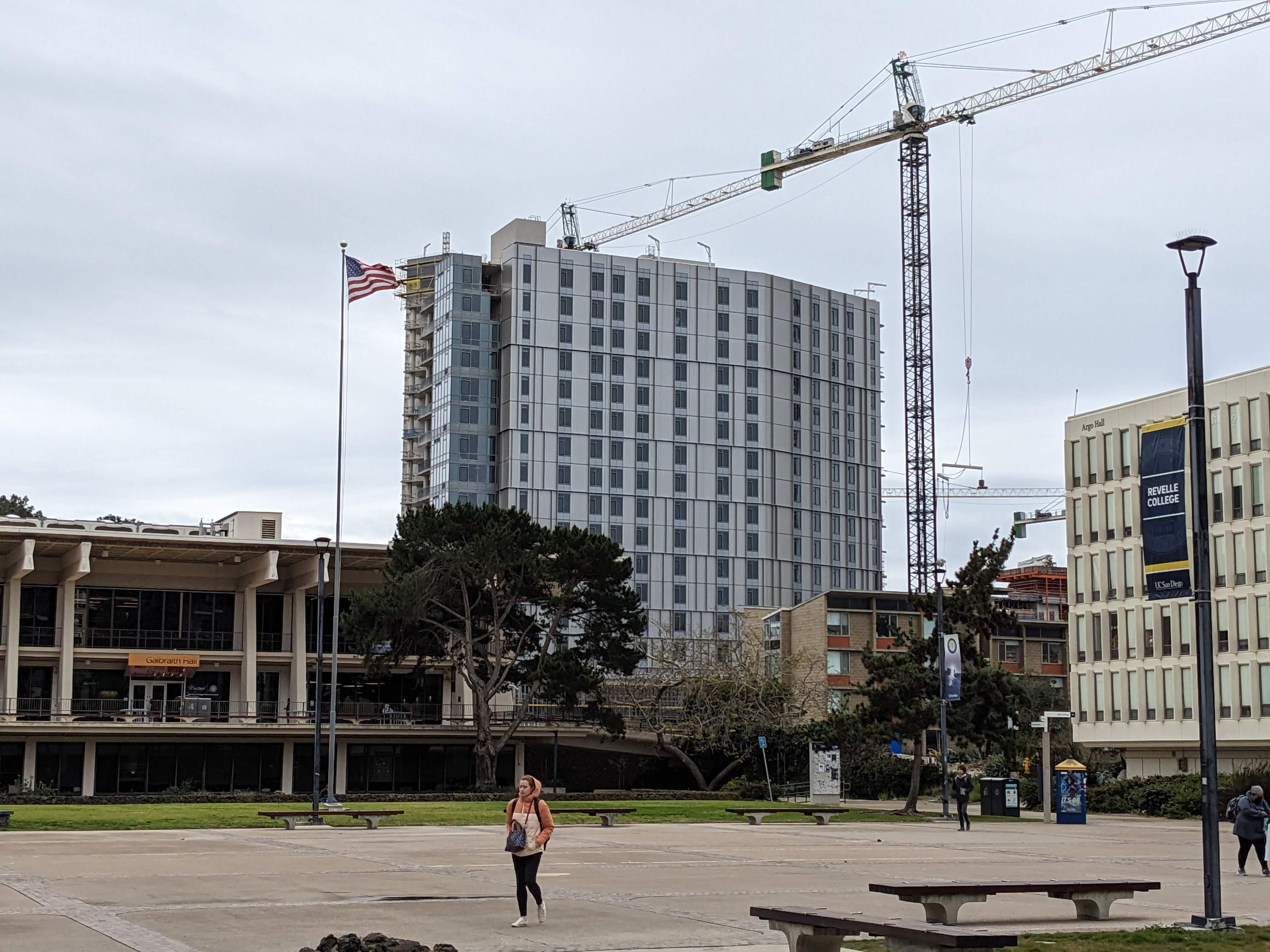
Podemos (under construction), as seen from Revelle Plaza

Eighth College students are primarily housed in the new Theatre District Living & Learning Neighborhood (TDLLN), which is the southernmost residential area on campus, just south of Revelle College. The dormitories at TDLLN are some of the tallest on the West Coast: the 21-story tower is the tallest building above sea level in San Diego, with a rooftop elevation of 660 feet. The neighborhood provided 2000 beds and a net increase of 300 parking spaces. The community partially opened with one building in fall 2023 due to construction delays, and fully opened the following year.
