= Processional =

Processional is anything of, and or pertaining to a procession.

Processional may also refer to:

- Processional (play), a 1925 play by John Howard Lawson
- Roman Processional, the tenth chapter of the Roman Ritual
- Processional cross, a cross or crucifix held during a Christian procession
- Processional walkway, a ceremonial walkway

== Music ==
- Processional hymn, a hymn or chant sung during a Christian procession
- Processional, a 1953 orchestral composition by Arthur Bliss
- Processional, a 1964 organ composition by William Mathias
- Processional, a 1983 piano composition by George Crumb
- Processional, a 2006 organ composition by Grayston Ives

== See also ==
- Procession (disambiguation)
