= University of California, San Diego =

Public research university in San Diego, California

- Motto: Fiat lux (Latin)
- Motto in English: "Let there be light"
- Type: Public land-grant research university
- Established: November 18, 1960; 66 years ago
- Parent institution: University of California
- Accreditation: WSCUC
- Academic affiliations: AAU; APRU; URA; Sea-grant; Space-grant
- Endowment: $1.59 billion (2024)
- Chancellor: Pradeep Khosla
- Faculty: 10,814 (fall 2025)
- Administrative staff: 31,665 (fall 2025)
- Students: 46,178 (fall 2025)
- Undergraduates: 35,442 (fall 2025)
- Postgraduates: 10,736 (fall 2025)
- Location: La Jolla, San Diego, California, United States; 32.8801°N 117.234°W
- Campus: 2,178 acres (881 ha); Large city
- Newspaper: The UCSD Guardian
- Colors: UC San Diego Navy, Blue, Yellow, and Gold
- Nickname: Tritons
- Sporting affiliations: NCAA Division I – Big West; MPSF; WWPA; WIRA
- Mascot: King Triton
- Website: ucsd.edu

The University of California, San Diego (Note: The UC San Diego Editorial Style Guide suggests to use no comma in its full name: University of California San Diego. The official campus name approved by the Regents of the University of California in November 1960 uses a comma. The current systemwide University of California Brand Guidelines published by the University of California Office of the President also use a comma.) (UC San Diego or UCSD) is a public land-grant research university in the La Jolla neighborhood of San Diego, California, United States. Established in 1960, it is the southernmost of the ten campuses of the University of California, located roughly 28 miles north of the Mexico–United States border at San Ysidro. It occupies 2,178 acres (881 ha) near the Pacific coast.

UC San Diego consists of 12 schools and has 8 undergraduate residential colleges. It is classified among "R1: Doctoral Universities – Very high research activity". The university offers over 200 undergraduate and graduate degree programs which included a student population of 35,442 undergraduate and 10,736 graduate students in 2025. Many of these degree programs are associated with research institutes nearby and affiliated with UCSD, such as the Salk Institute for Biological Studies and the Scripps Institution of Oceanography.

== History ==
When the Regents of the University of California originally authorized the San Diego campus in 1956, it was planned to be a graduate and research institution, providing instruction in the sciences, mathematics, and engineering. Local citizens supported the idea, voting the same year to transfer to the university 59 acres (24 ha) of mesa land on the coast near the pre-existing Scripps Institution of Oceanography. The Regents requested an additional gift of 550 acres (220 ha) of undeveloped mesa land northeast of Scripps, as well as 500 acres (200 ha) on the former site of Camp Matthews from the federal government, but Roger Revelle, then director of the Scripps Institution and main advocate for establishing the new campus, jeopardized the site selection by exposing the La Jolla community's exclusive real estate business practices, which were antagonistic to minority racial and religious groups. This outraged local conservatives, as well as Regent Edwin W. Pauley. Revelle also got involved in a bitter debate with Jonas Salk over where Salk's proposed institute would be located relative to the new campus.

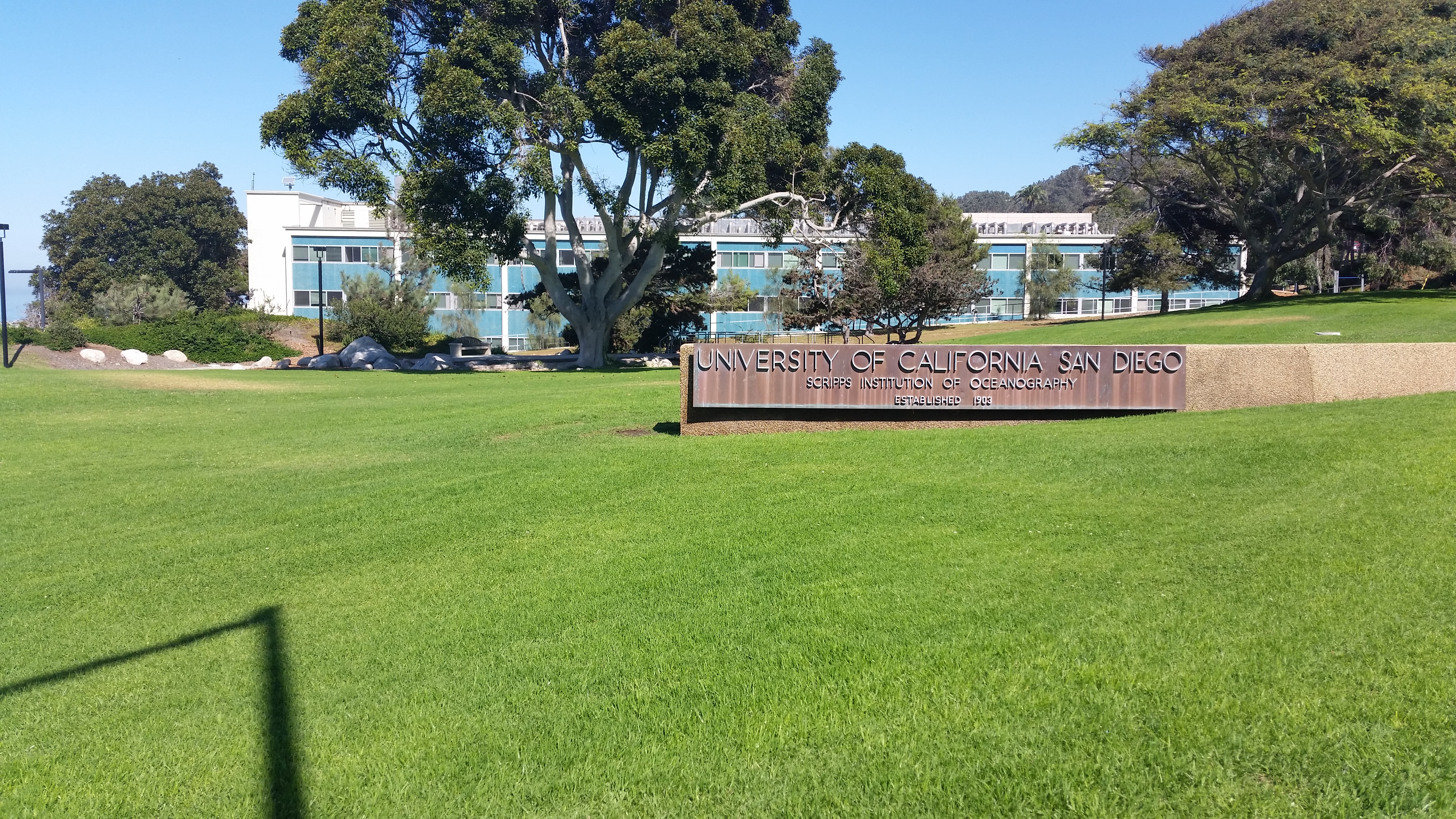
Scripps Institution of Oceanography at UC San Diego

UC president Clark Kerr satisfied San Diego city donors by changing the proposed name from the University of California, La Jolla, to the University of California, San Diego. The city voted to agree to its part of the deal in 1958, and the UC Board of Regents approved construction of the new campus in 1960. Because Revelle's tactless approaches to the clashes with Pauley and Salk had damaged his reputation with the board of regents, Kerr realized he could not nominate Revelle as the campus's first chancellor. Revelle's nomination would have become "an angry and drawn-out affair" and greatly detracted from the campus's future development. Herbert York, first director of Lawrence Livermore National Laboratory, was selected instead. York planned the main campus according to the "Oxbridge" model, relying on many of Revelle's ideas.

According to Kerr, "San Diego always asked for the best," though this created much friction throughout the UC system, including with Kerr himself, because UC San Diego often seemed to be "asking for too much and too fast." Kerr attributed UC San Diego's "special personality" to Scripps, which for over five decades had been the most isolated UC unit in every sense: geographically, financially, and institutionally. Scripps had originally explored the simple idea of adding a small program for graduate students to its existing research program. Over time, that idea evolved into something much larger and more complex, and it was a great shock to the Scripps community to learn that Scripps was now expected to become the nucleus of a new UC campus and would now be the object of far more attention from both the university administration in Berkeley and the state government in Sacramento.

UC San Diego was the first general campus of the University of California to be designed "from the top down" in terms of research emphasis. Local leaders disagreed on whether the new school should be a technical research institute or a more broadly based school that included undergraduates as well. John Jay Hopkins of General Dynamics Corporation pledged one million dollars for the former while the City Council offered free land for the latter. The original authorization for the San Diego campus given by the UC Regents in 1956 approved a "graduate program in science and technology" that included undergraduate programs, a compromise that won both the support of General Dynamics and the city voters' approval.

Nobel laureate Harold Urey, a physical chemist from the University of Chicago; James R. Arnold, a pioneering cosmochemist; and Hans Suess, who had published the first paper on the greenhouse effect with Revelle in the previous year were early recruits to the faculty in 1958. Maria Goeppert Mayer, later the second female Nobel laureate in physics, was appointed professor of physics in 1960. The graduate division of the school opened in 1960 with 20 faculty in residence, with instruction offered in the fields of physics, biology, chemistry, and earth science. Before the main campus completed construction, classes were held in Scripps Institution of Oceanography.

By 1963, new facilities on the mesa had been finished for the School of Science and Engineering, and new buildings were under construction for Social Sciences and Humanities. Ten additional faculty in those disciplines were hired, and the whole site was designated the First College of the new campus (it was later renamed after Roger Revelle). York resigned as chancellor that year and was replaced by John Semple Galbraith. The undergraduate program accepted its first class of 181 freshman at Revelle College in 1964. Second College was founded in 1964, on the land deeded by the federal government, and named after environmentalist John Muir two years later. The School of Medicine also accepted its first students in 1966.

Political theorist Herbert Marcuse joined the faculty in 1965. A champion of the New Left, he reportedly was the first protester to occupy the administration building in a demonstration organized by his student, political activist Angela Davis. The American Legion offered to buy out the remainder of Marcuse's contract for $20,000; the Regents censured Chancellor William J. McGill for defending Marcuse on the basis of academic freedom, but further action was averted after local leaders expressed support for Marcuse. Further student unrest was felt at the university, as the United States increased its involvement in the Vietnam War during the mid-1960s, when a student raised a Viet Minh flag over the campus. Protests escalated as the war continued and were only exacerbated after the National Guard fired on student protesters at Kent State University in 1970. Over 200 students occupied Urey Hall, with one student setting himself on fire in protest of the war. On May 11, 1970, George Winne, Jr., an undergraduate student majoring in history, killed himself on campus by self-immolation while carrying a sign that read "In God's name, End this war".

Early research activity and faculty quality, notably in the sciences, was integral to shaping the focus and culture of the university. Even before UC San Diego had its own campus, faculty recruits had already made significant research breakthroughs, such as the Keeling Curve, a graph that plots rapidly increasing carbon dioxide levels in the atmosphere and was the first significant evidence for global climate change; the Kohn–Sham equations, used to investigate particular atoms and molecules in quantum chemistry; and the Miller–Urey experiment, which gave birth to the field of prebiotic chemistry.

Engineering, particularly computer science, became an important part of the university's academics as it matured. University researchers helped develop UCSD Pascal, an early machine-independent programming language that later heavily influenced Java; the National Science Foundation Network, a precursor to the Internet; and the Network News Transfer Protocol during the late 1970s to 1980s.

Under Richard C. Atkinson's leadership as chancellor from 1980 to 1995, the university strengthened its ties with the city of San Diego by encouraging technology transfer with developing companies, transforming San Diego into a world leader in technology-based industries. He oversaw a rapid expansion of the School of Engineering, later renamed after Qualcomm founder Irwin M. Jacobs, with the construction of the San Diego Supercomputer Center and establishment of the computer science, electrical engineering, and bioengineering departments. Private donations increased from $15 million to nearly $50 million annually, faculty expanded by nearly 50%, and enrollment doubled to about 18,000 students during his administration. By the end of his chancellorship, the quality of UC San Diego graduate programs was ranked 10th in the nation by the National Research Council.

The university continued to undergo further expansion during the first decade of the new millennium with the establishment and construction of two new professional schools — the Skaggs School of Pharmacy and the Rady School of Management—and the California Institute for Telecommunications and Information Technology, a research institute run jointly with UC Irvine. UC San Diego also reached two financial milestones during this time, becoming the first university in the western region to raise over $1 billion in its eight-year fundraising campaign in 2007 and also obtaining an additional $1 billion through research contracts and grants in a single fiscal year for the first time in 2010. Despite this, due to the California budget crisis, the university loaned $40 million against its own assets in 2009 to offset a significant reduction in state educational appropriations. The salary of Pradeep Khosla, who became chancellor in 2012, has been the subject of controversy amidst continued budget cuts and tuition increases. In 2012, campus launched a 10-year, $2 billion fundraising campaign, which the campus completed 3 years early in 2019, making it the youngest university in the United States to have completed a $2 billion fundraiser.

On November 27, 2017, the university announced it would leave its longtime athletic home of the California Collegiate Athletic Association, an NCAA Division II league, to begin a transition to NCAA Division I in 2020. It joined the Big West Conference, already home to four other UC campuses (Davis, Irvine, Riverside, Santa Barbara). The university transitioned to NCAA Division I competition on July 1, 2020. The transition period ran through the 2023–24 school year.

In connection with the University Pro-Palestine Protests, an encampment was formed by student activist groups including Students for Justice in Palestine adjacent to Library Walk on May 1, 2024. Police cleared the encampment on May 6, 2024, and arrested 64 people. Students responded to the arrests with a walk-out two days later.

UC San Diego was also targeted by the federal government in a surge of mass SEVIS terminations and visa revocations for its international student population. Students with the Students' Civil Liberties Union responded to the SEVIS terminations with protests.

On February 2026, a Calmatters investigation showed that the UC San Diego Police Department had been involved in Operation Stonegarden, a United States Department of Homeland Security program providing law enforcement agencies with grants to work with the United States Border Patrol despite a 2017 California law restricting law enforcement agencies from collaborating on immigration enforcement operations. After student and public outcry led by the Students' Civil Liberties Union, Calmatters reported in August 2026 that UC San Diego's Police Department would no longer participate in Operation Stonegarden.

== Campus ==
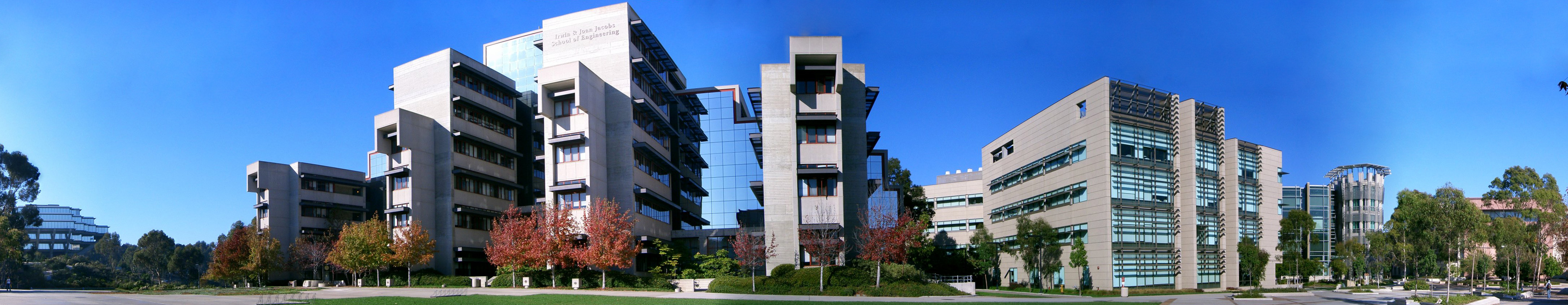
Panorama of the Jacobs School of Engineering on Earl Warren College mall. From left to right: Geisel Library, Engineering Building Unit (EBU) I, the Powell-Focht Bioengineering Building, the Computer Science Building, and EBU II (visible through trees)

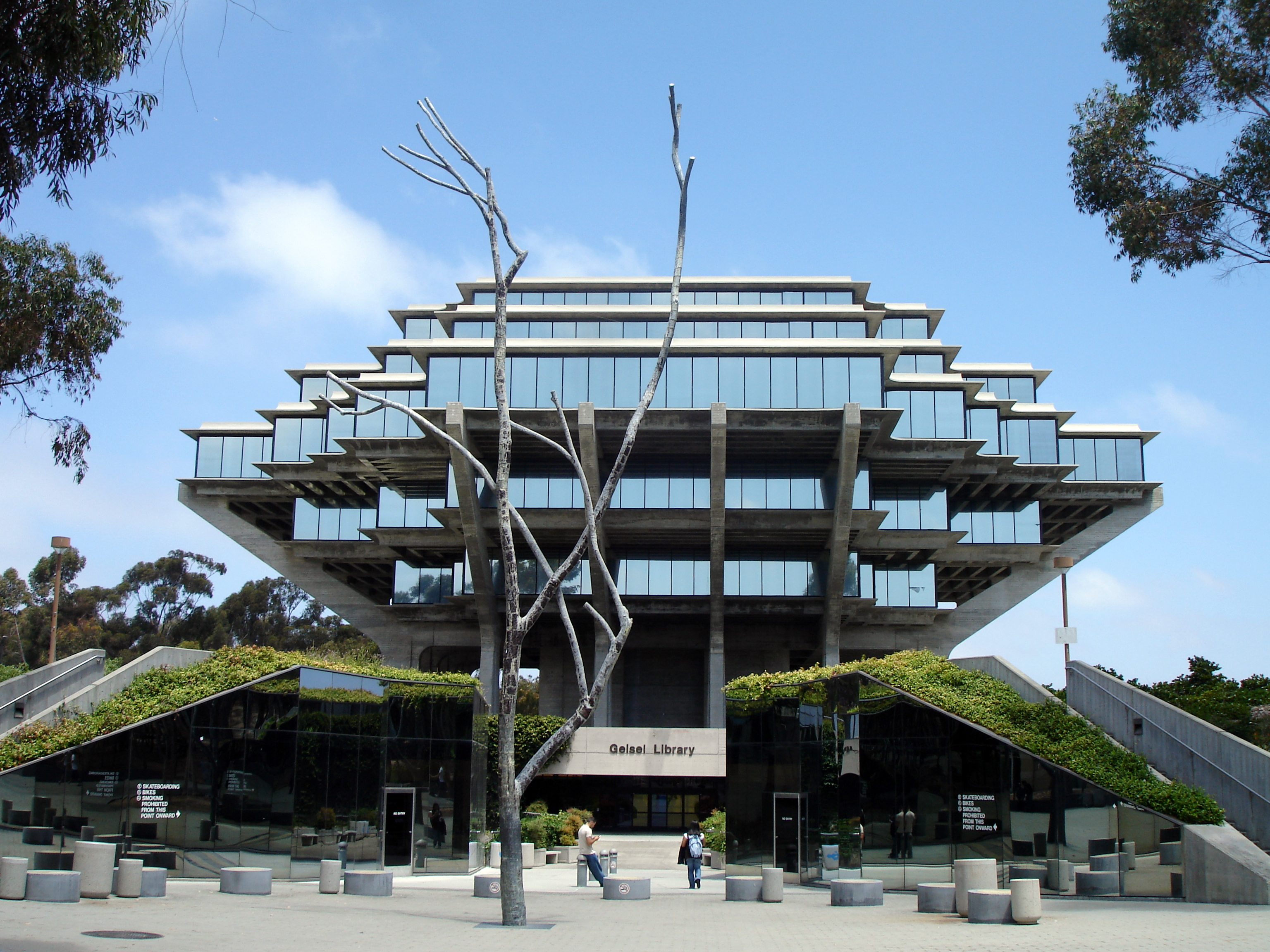
Geisel Library, named for Theodor Geisel, better known as Dr. Seuss

UC San Diego is located in the residential neighborhood of La Jolla of northern San Diego, bordered by the communities of La Jolla Shores, Torrey Pines, and University City. The main campus consists of 761 buildings that occupy 1,152 acres (466 ha), with natural reserves covering about 889 acres (360 ha) and outlying facilities taking up the remaining area. The San Diego Freeway (Interstate 5) passes through the campus and separates Jacobs Medical Center and Mesa apartment housing from the greater part of the university. The Preuss School, a college-preparatory charter school established and administered by UC San Diego, also lies on the eastern portion of the campus.

Standing at the center of the university is the iconic Geisel Library, named after Dr. Seuss following a $20 million donation from his wife Audrey Geisel. Library Walk, a heavily traveled pathway leading from the library to Gilman Drive, lies adjacent or close to Price Center, Center Hall, International Center, and various student services buildings, including the Student Services Center and the Career Services building. The layout of the main campus centers on the library, which is roughly surrounded by the eight residential colleges of Revelle, Muir, Marshall, Warren, Roosevelt, Sixth, Seventh, and Eighth, in addition to the School of Medicine. The eight colleges maintain separate housing facilities for their students and each college's buildings are differentiated by distinct architectural styles. As residential colleges were added while the university expanded, buildings in newer colleges were designed with styles that were starkly different from that of the original campus. The disparate architectural styles led Travel + Leisure, in its October 2013 issue, to name the university as one of the ugliest campuses in America, likening it to "a cupboard full of kitchen appliances whose function you can't quite fathom."

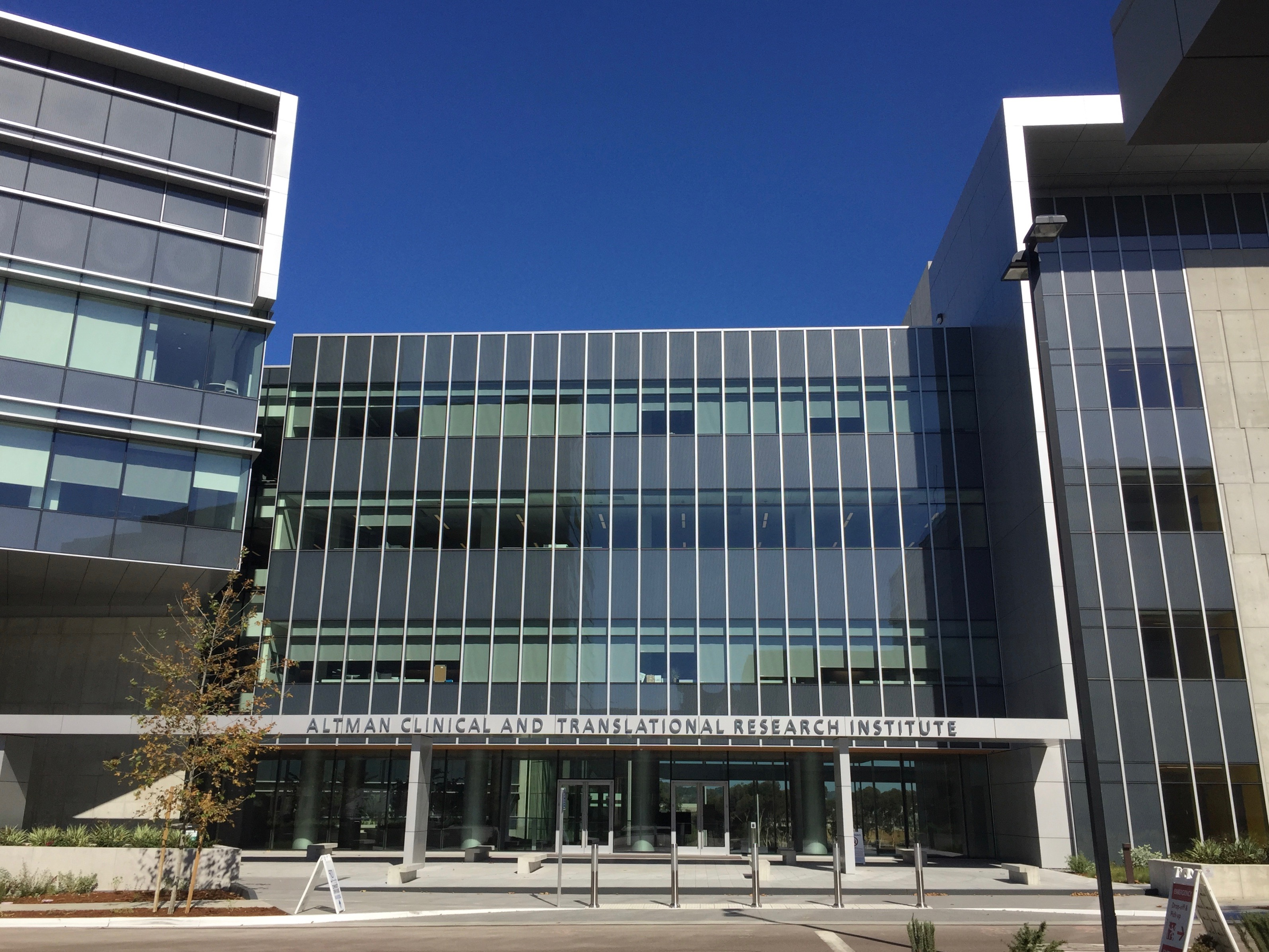
Altman Clinical and Translational Research Institute building

In addition to its academic and housing facilities, the campus features eucalyptus groves, Birch Aquarium, and several major research centers. The Scripps Institution owns a sea port and several open ocean vessels for marine research. Several large shake facilities, including the world record holding Large High Performance Outdoor Shake Table, used for earthquake simulations, are also maintained by the university.

The university has actively sought to reduce carbon emissions and energy usage on campus, earning a "gold" sustainability performance rating in the Sustainability Tracking Assessment and Rating System (STARS) survey. It was also praised in The Princeton Review's Guide to 322 Green Colleges: 2013 Edition for its strong commitment to sustainability in its academic offerings, campus infrastructure, activities and career preparation.

=== Academic facilities ===
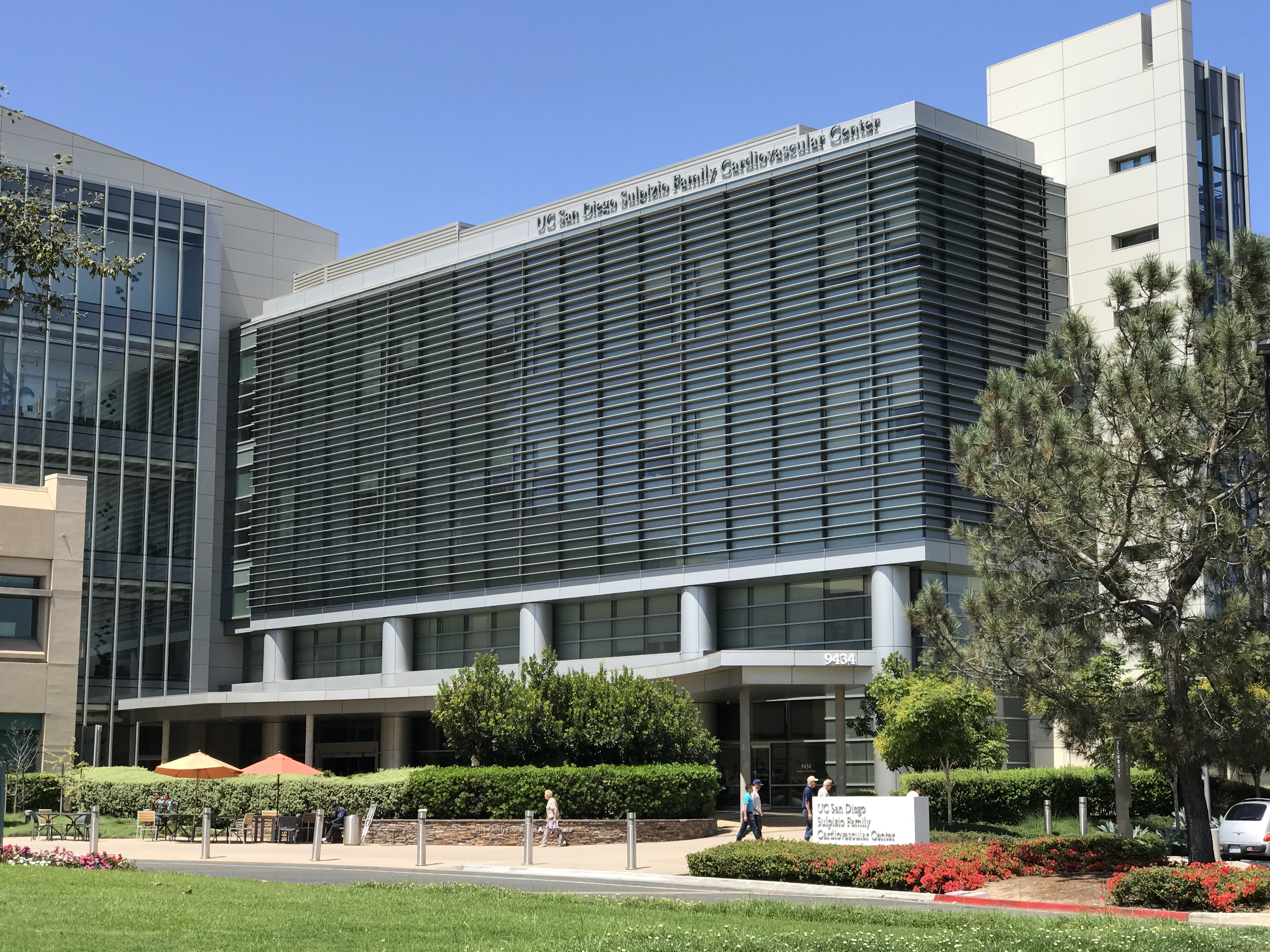
The Sulpizio Family Cardiovascular Center houses the Departments of Cardiology and Emergency Medicine at UC San Diego Health

When the campus opened in 1964, it consisted only of Revelle College and Scripps Institution of Oceanography. The school's rapid increase in enrollment and opening to undergraduate students over its first decade spurred major campus expansion. Muir, Marshall, and Warren Colleges were established and built during the late 1960s through 1980s as the student population continued to grow considerably. Initially, the campus followed a rough north–south axis alongside Historic Route 101, though construction in the following decades deviated from this, with the core of the campus shifting towards Geisel Library.

The school's two engineering departments were merged into the School of Engineering (renamed the Jacobs School of Engineering in 1987 in honor of Irwin Jacobs, founder of Qualcomm, and his wife Joan Jacobs) in 1982. New buildings have been continually added as the division expands. Major additions include the San Diego Supercomputer Center, completed in 1986; Powell-Focht Bioengineering Hall, completed in 2003; and the Structural and Materials Engineering building, completed in 2012. Significant construction work on the previously undeveloped northern part of campus also took place during this time. Two graduate professional schools, the School of Global Policy and Strategy and the Rady School of Management, were constructed in the area adjacent to and near the Supercomputer Center, as well as Roosevelt College, a transfer student apartment complex called The Village at Torrey Pines, and the RIMAC athletic facilities.

=== Arts facilities ===
UC San Diego's Joan and Irwin Jacobs Theatre District, located just south of Revelle College, houses the Mandell Weiss Center for the Performing Arts. The center's facilities are shared with La Jolla Playhouse, a Tony Award-winning professional theatre which is partnered with the university. UC San Diego and La Jolla Playhouse share four large performance venues in the Theatre District: the Mandell Weiss Theatre, the Mandell Weiss Forum, the Sheila and Hughes Potiker Theatre, and the Theodore and Adele Shank Theatre. These venues, on top of hosting the undergraduate and graduate productions of the UC San Diego Department of Theatre and Dance, often host the Playhouse's professional productions of plays and musicals, of which several have transferred to Broadway. Other theatre performance facilities at UC San Diego include the Molli and Arthur Wagner Dance Building, also located within the Theatre District, and the Arthur Wagner Theatre located in Revelle College's Galbraith Hall.

Other arts facilities include the 800-seat Mandeville Auditorium and Conrad Prebys Music Center, used by UC San Diego's music department, as well as Mandeville Center, the Visual Arts Facilities (VAF) building, and the Structural and Material Engineerings (SME) building, used by UC San Diego's visual arts department. In 2022, UC San Diego opened the Epstein Family Amphitheater, a 2,650-seat open air performance venue featuring a year-round program (including summer) of concerts, performances, and events.

The 1978 film Attack of the Killer Tomatoes was filmed on campus.

=== Public art ===
More than a dozen public art projects, part of the Stuart Collection, decorate the campus. The first, and a particularly well-known installation, Sun God, a large winged creature by Niki de Saint Phalle located near the Faculty Club. Other collection pieces include Richard Fleischner's La Jolla Project (a collection of Stonehenge-like stone blocks), Do Ho Suh's Fallen Star (a house sitting atop an engineering building in Warren College), a table by Jenny Holzer, an installation by Bruce Nauman on the Powell Structural Systems Laboratory titled Vices and Virtues, and three metallic Eucalyptus trees by Terry Allen.

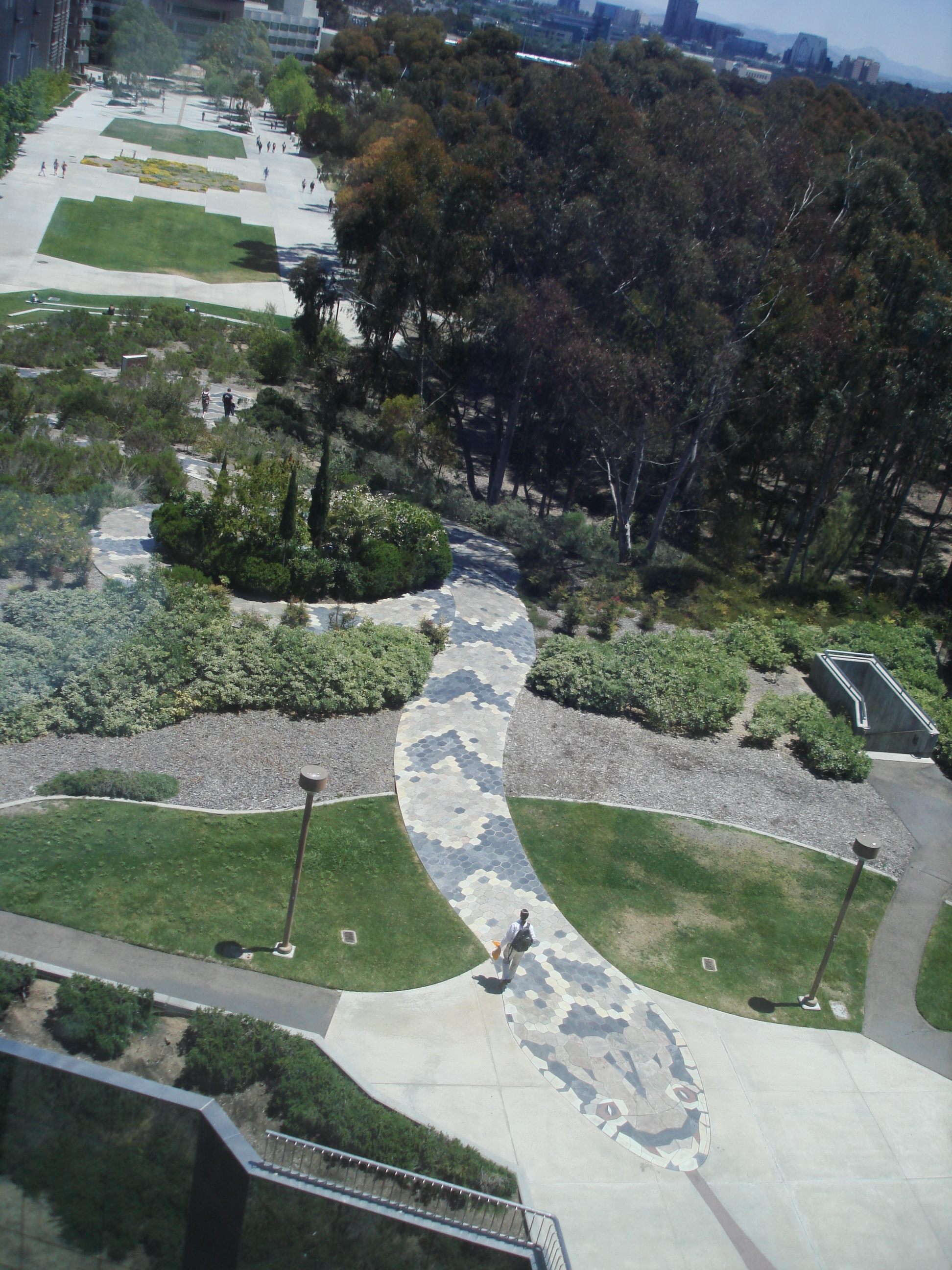
Snake Path, east of Geisel Library, May 2007

The collection also includes a work by Alexis Smith consisting of a path made of a large coiling snake whose head guides towards Geisel Library, with a quote from John Milton's Paradise Lost carved along its length: "And wilt thou not be loath to leave this Paradise, but shalt possess a Paradise within thee, happier far." The path circles around its own garden and a large granite book-shaped block. One of the newest additions to the collection is Tim Hawkinson's giant teddy bear made of six boulders located in between the newly constructed Calit2 buildings. Another notable campus sight was the graffiti staircase of Mandeville Hall, a series of corridors that had been tagged with graffiti by generations of students over decades of use; this was recently replaced with the Graffiti Art Park. Students in the university's visual arts department also create temporary public art installations as part of their coursework. In 2007, the university sponsored a $56,000 performance art project to develop a sense of community at the sprawling campus.

Shepard Fairey, most notable for his Barack Obama "Hope" poster, painted a mural at the Ché Café, one of UC San Diego's most famous buildings and collectives, on an outside wall facing Scholars Drive, that features the likenesses of Martin Luther King Jr. and other political figures. Underground street artist Swampy created a large piece inside the Ché Café, visible through the courtyard depicting his signature mammoth skeleton. Local San Diego artist Mario Torero, in collaboration with university art students, painted a mural at the Café in commemoration of Angela Davis and Rigoberta Menchú, along with other notable political figures. The Ché Café remains a hub for underground and politically progressive artists. Torero was invited back to the university in 2009 to create a mural called "Chicano Legacy" based on content suggested by Chicano students. The mural is a $10,000 digital image on a 15-by-50-foot (4.6 by 15.2 m) canvas mounted on the exterior of Peterson Hall, which includes representations of César Chávez and Dolores Huerta as well as the kiosk structure at Chicano Park. In 2016 a mural entitled "Enduring Spell" was completed by El Mac in the Argo courtyard,

=== Transportation ===
UC San Diego maintains about 17,000 parking spaces and offers a number of alternative transportation options. The university runs a shuttle system, which is provided free for students, faculty, and staff, that services the main campus, UC San Diego Medical Center, university affiliated research centers, as well as nearby apartment complexes. As part of a greater initiative to reduce the university's impact on the environment, a portion of the shuttle fleet has been refitted to exclusively use biodiesel fuel derived from vegetable oil. In 2023, UC San Diego Triton Transit begun operating electric shuttles for its SIO route. However, plans to expand electric bus usage are currently paused as the company who manufactures the buses has declared bankruptcy. UC San Diego also reserves parking spaces for carpools, maintains a fleet of on-campus Zipcars, and provides free bike rentals.

San Diego Trolley with Blue Line Extension to UC San Diego

The UC San Diego campus is also served by the Blue Line of the San Diego Trolley. The campus has two trolley stations: UC San Diego Health La Jolla and UC San Diego Central Campus station. As part of the university's existing public transit partnerships, all students have unlimited access to MTS regional buses and trolleys, as well as most North County Transit District transportation services, upon paying a "transportation fee" as part of registration.

=== Construction ===
In May 2023, the university announced the construction of Triton Center, a new facility near University Center that will host numerous student services along with an Alumni & Welcome Center. It is expected to open Winter of 2026. It remains under construction as of Spring 2026.

In September 2023, chancellor Pradeep Khosla announced his intention to present a housing proposition to the Regents of the University of California. The housing proposition currently aims to house an additional 6,000 students, though Khosla states he is open to changing the scale of the project. The proposition is expected to reach the Regents sometime in 2024. If the proposition is accepted by the regents, the new student housing would occupy what is currently Pepper Canyon East.

The university also has various planned and ongoing projects in other locations, such as at Scripps Institution of Oceanography, UC San Diego Health La Jolla, and at UC San Diego Medical Center in Hillcrest. These projects include renovations to Birch Aquarium, a new fire station, and a 30-acre science research center, among many others.

== Organization ==
UC San Diego is a large, primarily residential, public research university accredited by the Western Association of Schools and Colleges that offers a four-year Bachelor of Arts and Bachelor of Science degree to undergraduate students. The full-time undergraduate program, which administered by Division of Undergraduate Education (2014) comprises the majority of enrollments at the university. The university offers 125 bachelor's degree programs traditionally organized into five disciplinary divisions: arts and humanities, biological sciences, engineering, mathematics and physical sciences, and social sciences. Students are also free to design special majors or engage in dual majors. As of 2010, 38% of undergraduates majored in the social sciences, followed by 25% in biological sciences, 18% in engineering, 8% in sciences and math, 4% in humanities, and 3% in the arts.

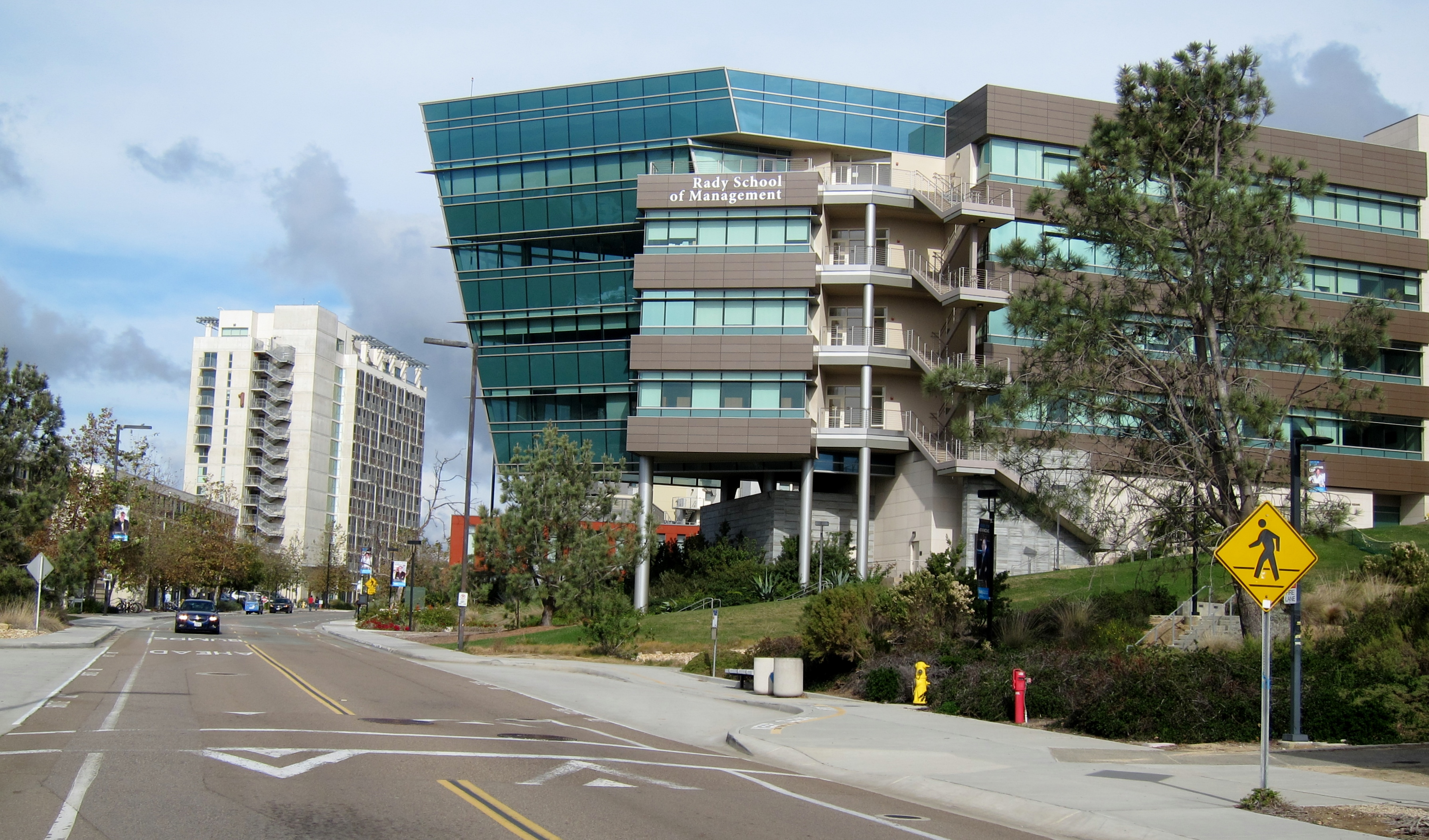
UC San Diego Rady School of Management and a Seventh College dormitory, January 2016

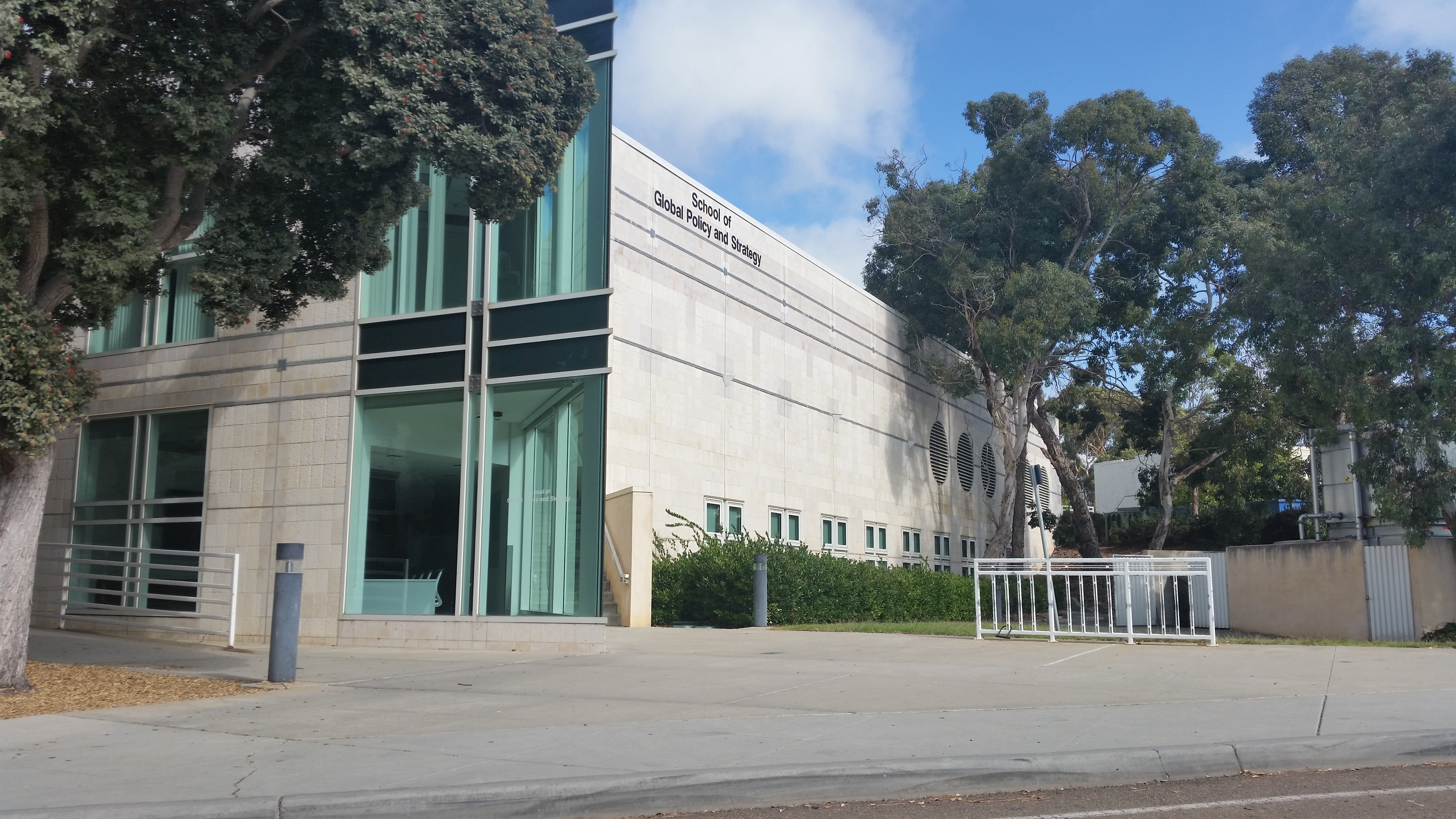
West exterior of the School of Global Policy and Strategy

UC San Diego's comprehensive graduate program, which administered by the Division of Graduate Education and Postdoctoral Affairs (2018) is composed of several divisions and professional schools (in parentheses their founding), including Scripps Institution of Oceanography (1903), School of Medicine (1968), Institute of Engineering in Medicine (2008), School of Global Policy and Strategy (1986), Jacobs School of Engineering (1964), Rady School of Management (2001), Skaggs School of Pharmacy (2002), Wertheim School of Public Health (2019), School of Computing, Information, and Data Sciences (2024), Halicioğlu Data Science Institute (2018), School of Arts and Humanities (1965), School of Biological Sciences (1961), School of Physical Sciences (1960) and School of Social Sciences (1986). The university offers 35 masters programs, 47 doctoral programs, five professional programs, and nine joint doctoral programs with San Diego State University and other UC campuses.

The university also offers a continuing and public education program through the UC San Diego Division of Extended Studies. (1966) Approximately 50,000 enrollees per year are educated in this branch of the university, which offers over 100 professional and specialized certificate programs. Courses are offered at Extended Studies facilities, located both on the main campus and off-campus, and also online. UC San Diego Division of Extended Studies offers programs in Arts & Humanities, Business & Leadership, Data Analysis & Mathematics, Digital Arts, Education, Engineering, Environment & Sustainability, International Programs, Languages, Law, Occupational Safety & Health, Pre-College, Sciences, Technology, and Writing, as well as public programs such as the UC San Diego Osher Lifelong Learning Institute and the Helen Edison Lecture Series. UC San Diego Division of Extended Studies also has a 66,000-square-foot hub at the corner of Park Boulevard and Market Street in East Village, referred to as the Innovative Cultural and Education Hub. The project aims to "advance the burgeoning tech ecosystem downtown, contribute to the city's lively arts and culture scene, and connect in multiple ways with diverse neighborhoods such as Barrio Logan, the Diamond District, and Golden Hill."

=== Residential colleges ===
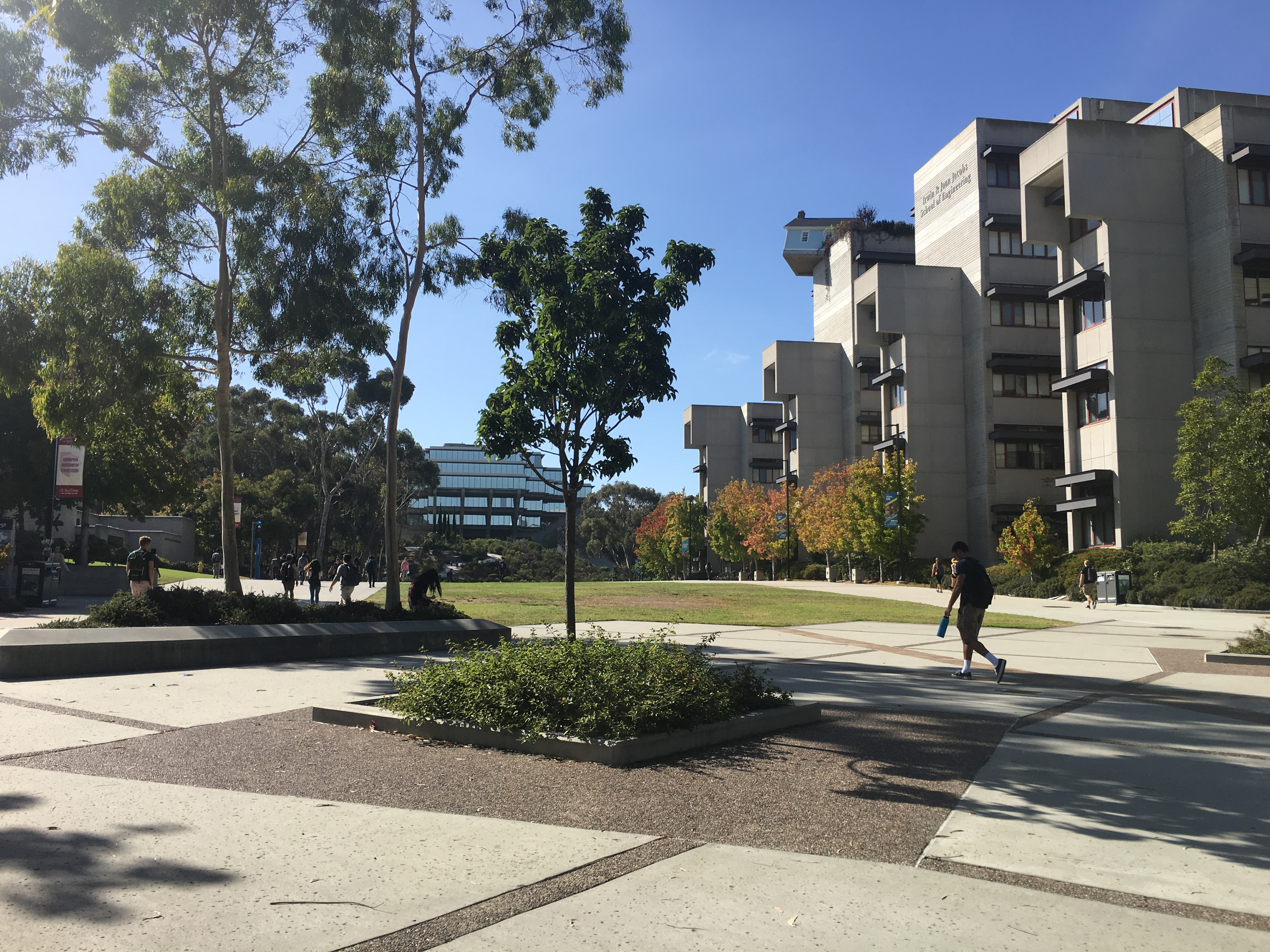
Warren College contains most of the engineering buildings

UC San Diego's undergraduate division is organized into eight residential colleges, each headed by its own provost. They all set their own general education requirements, manage separate administrative and advising staff, and grant unique degrees. In chronological order by date of foundation, the eight colleges are:

1. Revelle College, founded in 1964 as First College, emphasizes a "Renaissance education" through the Humanities sequence which integrates history, literature, and philosophy. It has highly structured requirements.
2. John Muir College, founded in 1967 as Second College, emphasizes a "spirit of self-sufficiency and individual choice" and offers loosely structured general-education requirements.
3. Thurgood Marshall College, founded in 1970 as Third College, emphasizes "scholarship, social responsibility and the belief that a liberal arts education must include an understanding of one's role in society".
4. Earl Warren College, founded in 1974 as Fourth College, requires students to pursue a major of their choice while also requiring two "programs of concentration" in disciplines unrelated to each other and their major "toward a life in balance".
5. Eleanor Roosevelt College, founded in 1988 as Fifth College, focuses its core education program on a cross-cultural interdisciplinary course sequence entitled "Making of the Modern World", has a foreign language requirement, and encourages studying abroad.
6. Sixth College, founded in 2001, has a focus on "historical and philosophical connections among culture, art, and technology."
7. Seventh College, founded in 2020, enrolled its first cohort of students in fall 2020, with the theme "A Changing Planet."
8. Eighth College, founded in 2021, enrolled its first cohort of students in fall 2023, with the theme of "Engagement & Community"

Students affiliate with a college based upon its particular philosophy and environment as majors are not exclusive to specific colleges. Revelle and Sixth enroll the largest number of undergraduate students, followed by Warren, Muir, Roosevelt, and Marshall. Each undergraduate college sets different requirements for awarding graduation and provost's honors, separate from departmental and Phi Beta Kappa honors.

Each college has a distinct area of campus for its administration, housing, dining, and student life facilities. From south to north, Eighth, Revelle, Muir, Marshall, Sixth, Roosevelt, and Seventh Colleges lie along an approximately straight line along Ridge Walk on the western side of the main campus. Warren College is situated to the northeast of Geisel Library and Price Center.

Students who choose to live on campus are not required to live at the college in which they are enrolled.

Beginning in 2020, new developments that the university refers to as "Living and Learning Neighborhoods" were constructed in an effort to increase the housing capacity of the campus. The first neighborhood constructed, the North Torrey Pines Living and Learning Neighborhood, was completed in 2020. The neighborhood became the current home of Sixth College (which had previously been located in Pepper Canyon to the east of University Center), and is located between John Muir College and Thurgood Marshall College.

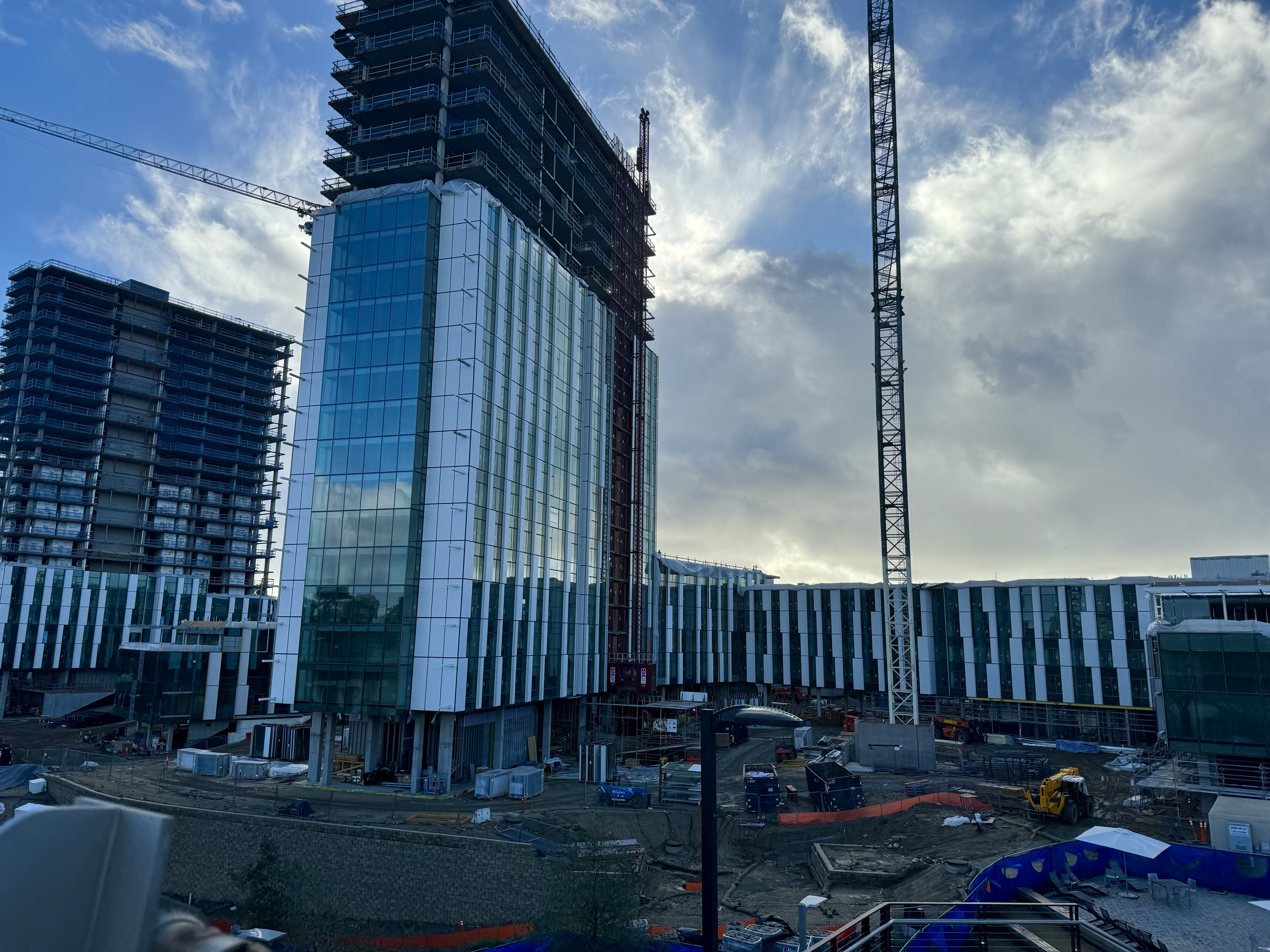
Pepper Canyon West Living & Learning Neighborhood under construction as viewed from UC San Diego Central Campus station.

The Theatre District Living and Learning Neighborhood, which houses approximately 2,000 undergraduate students is the location of Eighth College.

The Pepper Canyon West Living and Learning Neighborhood is located in the west segment of the Pepper Canyon area of the university, next to UC San Diego Central Campus station. The Pepper Canyon West Living and Learning Neighborhood houses 1,300 transfer students and upper-division undergraduate students from all eight UC San Diego colleges in single-occupancy rooms.

The Ridge Walk North Living and Learning Community is the most recent neighborhood to be constructed. This neighborhood is located in the easternmost portion of Thurgood Marshall College, and houses 2,400 undergraduate students, primarily from Thurgood Marshall College. Construction was completed in advance of the start of the 2025-26 academic year.

=== Governance ===
As one of the 10 general campuses of the University of California system, UC San Diego is governed by a 26-member board of regents consisting of 18 officials appointed by the governor of California, seven ex officio members, and a single student regent. The current president of the University of California is Michael Drake, and the chancellor of UC San Diego is Pradeep Khosla. Academic policies are set by the school's Academic Senate, a legislative body composed of all university faculty members. Nine vice chancellors manage academic affairs, research, diversity, marine sciences, student affairs, planning, external relations, business affairs, and health sciences and report directly to the chancellor.

As of 2025, there has been a total of 2 student regents from UC San Diego: Linda Rae Sabo in 1982, an undergraduate senior at the time, and Hayley Weddle in 2019, a graduate student at the time.

=== Research ===
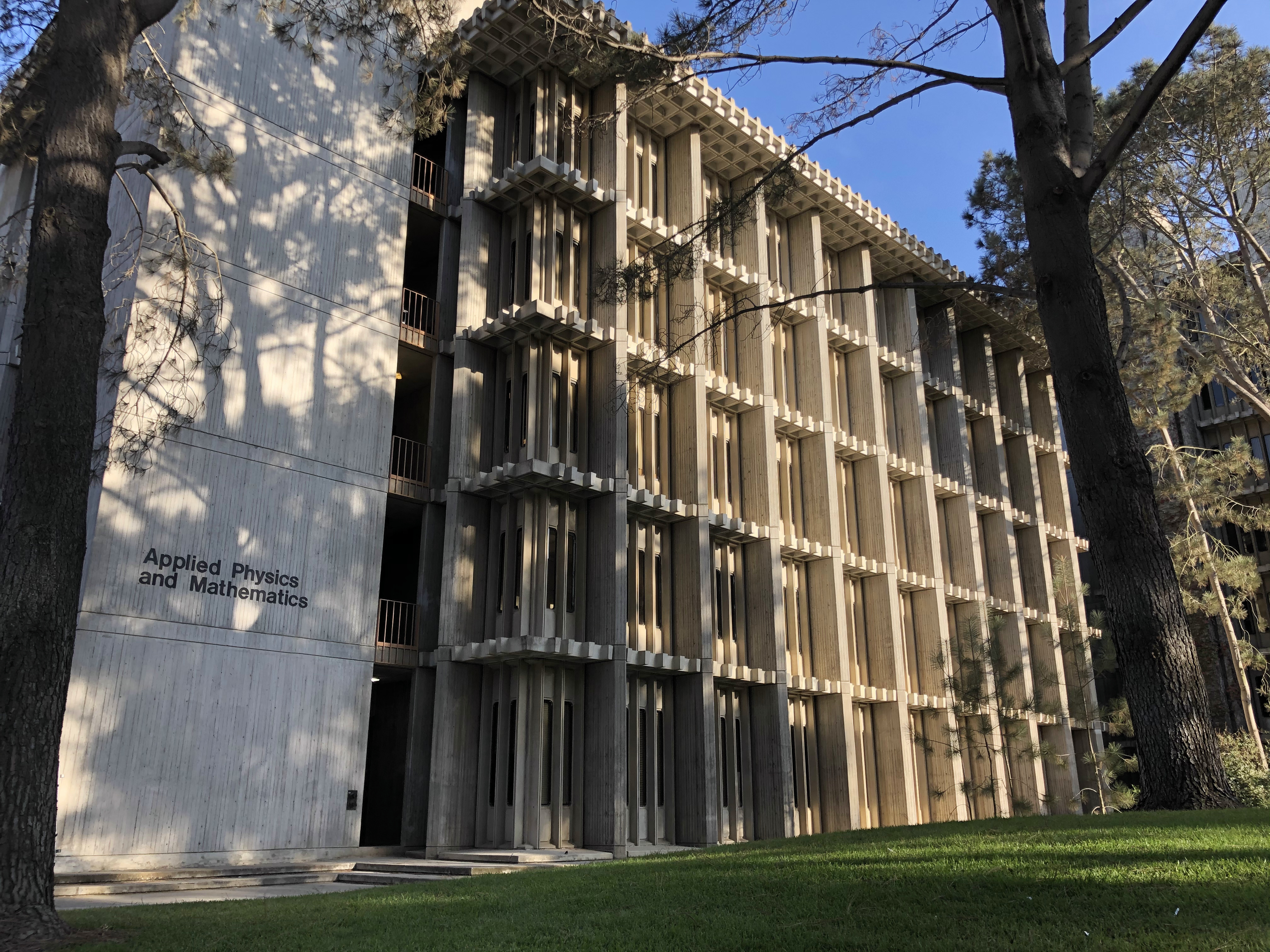
Applied Physics and Mathematics

The Nature Index lists UC San Diego as 8th in the United States for research output by article count from 2024 to 2025. The National Science Foundation ranked UC San Diego 7th among American universities for research and development expenditures in 2021 with $1.42 billion. The university operates several organized research units, including the Center for Astrophysics and Space Sciences (CASS), the Center for Drug Discovery Innovation, and the Institute for Neural Computation. UC San Diego also maintains close ties to the nearby Scripps Research and Salk Institute for Biological Studies. In 1977, UC San Diego developed and released the UCSD Pascal programming language. The university was designated as one of the original national Alzheimer's disease research centers in 1984 by the National Institute on Aging. In 2018, UC San Diego received $10.5 million from the National Nuclear Security Administration to establish the Center for Matters under Extreme Pressure (CMEC).

The university founded the San Diego Supercomputer Center (SDSC) in 1985, which provides high-performance computing for research in various scientific disciplines. In 2000, UC San Diego partnered with UC Irvine to create the Qualcomm Institute, which integrates research in photonics, nanotechnology, and wireless telecommunication to develop solutions to problems in energy, health, and the environment.

UC San Diego also operates Scripps Institution of Oceanography (SIO), one of the largest centers of research in earth science in the world, which predates the university itself. Together, SDSC and SIO, along with funding partner universities Caltech, SDSU, and UC Santa Barbara, manage the High Performance Wireless Research and Education Network (HPWREN).

=== Rankings ===
Academic rankings

National
- Forbes: 20
- U.S. News & World Report: 29
- Washington Monthly: 24
- WSJ/College Pulse: 30

Global
- ARWU: 18
- QS: 66
- THE: 34
- U.S. News & World Report: 21 (tie)

National Program Rankings
Program	Ranking
Political Science	8
Engineering	10
Fine Arts	10
Pharmacy	12
Economics	14
Psychology	12
Earth Sciences	9
Biological Sciences	17
Computer Science	13
Physics	21
Pharmacy	18
Mathematics	20
Chemistry	20
Medicine: Research	21
Medicine: Primary Care	26
Biostatistics	34
Sociology	31
History	30
Statistics	41
English	53
Public Affairs	57
Business	78

Global Subject Rankings
Program	Ranking
Artificial Intelligence	109
Arts & Humanities	59
Biology and Biochemistry	7
Biotechnology & Applied Microbiology	8
Cardiac and Cardiovascular Systems	69
Cell Biology	11
Chemistry	77
Clinical Medicine	18
Computer Science	47
Condensed Matter Physics	101
Ecology	185
Economics and Business	115
Electrical and Electronic Engineering	199
Endocrinology and Metabolism	28
Energy and Fuels	85
Engineering	120
Environment/Ecology	98
Gastroenterology and Hepatology	1
Geosciences	29
Immunology	15
Infectious Diseases	42
Marine and Freshwater Biology	17
Materials Science	67
Mathematics	106
Meteorology and Atmospheric Sciences	21
Microbiology	5
Molecular Biology and Genetics	10
Nanoscience and Nanotechnology	108
Neuroscience and Behavior	12
Oncology	37
Optics	118
Pharmacology and Toxicology	16
Physical Chemistry	101
Physics	68
Plant and Animal Science	53
Psychiatry/Psychology	19
Public, Environmental and Occupational Health	70
Radiology, Nuclear Medicine and Medical Imaging	61
Social Sciences and Public Health	59
Space Science	78
Surgery	100

==== National rankings ====
UC San Diego is ranked 5th as Best Public University by Academic Ranking of World Universities and 16th in the U.S. by the Center for World University Rankings. Washington Monthly ranked the university 24th in its 2024 National University ranking, based on its contribution to the public good as measured by social mobility, research, and promoting public service. UC San Diego ranked fifth in the nation in terms of research and development expenditures in 2018, with $1.265 billion spent. Kiplinger in 2014 ranked UC San Diego 14th out of the top 100 best-value public colleges and universities in the nation, and 3rd in California. UC San Diego was ranked 29th among national universities in the United States and 6th among public universities by U.S. News & World Report's 2025 rankings.

==== Global rankings ====
Top 10 foreign countries in headcount (Fall 2025)
Country	Headcount
China	3,788
India	1,269
Taiwan	374
South Korea	355
Canada	189
Indonesia	150
Japan	127
Saudi Arabia	109
Mexico	98
Vietnam	96

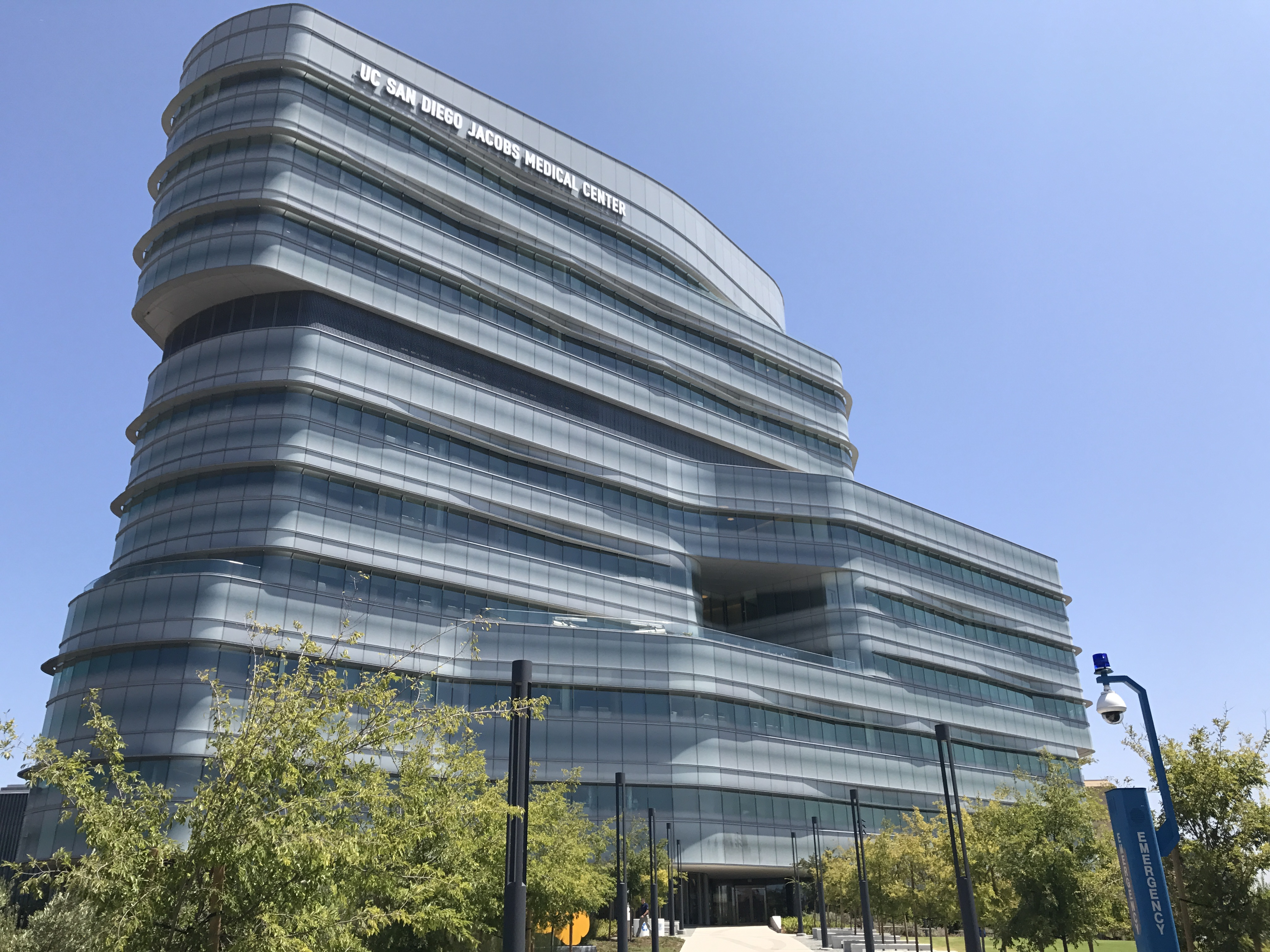
Jacobs Medical Center as seen from the southwest path

UC San Diego has been recognized as a Public Ivy. As a research university it has ranked 35th in the world by the Nature Index, 38th in the world by the Scrimago Institutions Rankings, 14th globally in "Research Discipline" by the Lens Metric, 21st in U.S. News & World Report's 2025-2026 global university rankings, 18th in the world by the Academic Ranking of World Universities, and 18th in the world by the Center for World University Rankings.

The University of California San Diego is ranked 18th by the Academic Ranking of World Universities, and is ranked 33rd "Best University in the World" by the Center for World University Rankings for 2025. In 2025, UC San Diego was ranked 34th in the world by the Times Higher Education World University Rankings. In 2024, the Centre for Science and Technology Studies at Leiden University named UC San Diego 49th in the world for scientific impact.

==== Graduate school rankings ====
The UC San Diego School of Medicine is ranked tied for 18th for research and 12th for primary care in the 2018 U.S. News & World Report rankings. The Rady School of Management at UC San Diego is ranked 17th in the world for faculty research and 8th for alumni entrepreneurship in the 2014 Financial Times' Global MBA. In 2014 the Rady School ranked 1st in the nation in intellectual capital by Bloomberg Businessweek, which measured faculty research published in the top 20 business journals from 2009 to 2013. UC San Diego was named 8th in the nation among doctoral institutions for the number of students who study abroad for a full academic year, according to the Institute of International Education Open Doors report. Three doctoral programs at UC San Diego—biological sciences, bioengineering, and Scripps Institution of Oceanography—are 1st in the nation in the National Research Council's Data-Based Assessment of Research-Doctorate Programs report.

==== Departmental rankings ====
Departmental rankings (including specialties) in the national top 10 according to the 2025 U.S. News & World Report Best Graduate Schools report include Biology & Biochemistry (7th), Biotechnology & Applied Microbiology (8th), Microbiology (5th), Molecular Biology & Genetics (10th), and Gastroenterology & Hepatology (1st)

Academic subjects in the global top 20 according to the Academic Ranking of World Universities (ARWU) for 2025 include Oceanography (1st), Pharmacy and Pharmaceutical Sciences (9th), Earth Sciences (12), Political Sciences (12th), Human Biological Sciences (13th), Biological Sciences (14th), Economics (14th), Atmospheric Science (15th), Materials Science and Engineering (17th), and Mechanical Engineering (20th).

Departmental rankings in the global top 20 according to the QS World University Rankings for 2025 include Anatomy and Physiology (18th), Biological Sciences (11th), Pharmacy and Pharmacology (7th), Geophysics (20th). Additional rankings within the global top 40 include Earth and Marine Sciences (22nd), Medicine (22nd), Economics and Econometrics (26th), Geology (27th), Data Science and Artificial Intelligence (28th), Politics (33rd), Electrical/Electronic Engineering (37th), Chemistry (37th), Computer Science and Information Systems (37th), and Natural Sciences (38th).

The Hollywood Reporter has ranked UC San Diego's graduate theatre program among the top ten drama schools in 2016 (6th), 2017 (5th), 2018 (4th), 2019 (3rd), 2020 (3rd), and 2021 (5th) also ranking the undergraduate theatre program as one of the top five in the nation in 2018.

=== Admissions ===
Undergraduate admission statistics
	Fall 2025	Fall 2024	Fall 2023	Fall 2022	Fall 2021
First-time Freshmen
Applicants	136,727	134,450	130,835	131,229	118,383
Admits	38,457	35,916	32,061	31,102	40,496
Admit rate	28%	27%	25%	24%	34%
Enrolled	7,801	7,331	7,005	6,547	7,543
Yield rate	20%	20%	22%	21%	19%
Transfers
Applicants	23,471	22,499	19,977	19,734	22,492
Admits	12,186	12,190	12,264	11,430	12,175
Admit rate	52%	54%	61%	58%	54%
Enrolled	3,587	3,754	3,210	3,069	3,594
Yield rate	29%	31%	26%	27%	30%

UC San Diego is categorized by U.S. News & World Report as "most selective" for college admissions ratings within the United States. For the fall 2022 admissions cycle, the school received 150,963 applications from both freshman and transfer applicants. Of those 150,963 applications, 131,229 applications were from prospective freshmen with UC San Diego granting admission to just 31,102 applicants, almost 9,000 fewer than the previous year (acceptance rate of 23.7% for the fall 2022 admission cycle).

In 2009, UC San Diego mistakenly sent Admit Day welcome emails to all its 47,000 freshmen applicants, instead of just the 17,000 who had been admitted. However, school officials quickly realized the mistake and sent an apology email within two hours.

Graduate admissions are largely centralized through the Office of Graduate Studies. However, the Rady School of Management, Scripps Institution of Oceanography, and the School of Global Policy and Strategy (GPS) handle their own admissions. For Fall 2012, the UC San Diego School of Medicine offered admission to 5% of its applicants.

== Student life ==
Undergraduate demographics as of Fall 2023
Race and ethnicity	Total
Asian	34%
Hispanic	25%
White	18%
Foreign national	12%
Two or more races	6%
Black	2%
Unknown	2%
Economic diversity
Low-income (Note: The percentage of students who received an income-based federal Pell grant intended for low-income students.)	32%
Affluent (Note: The percentage of students who are a part of the American middle class at the bare minimum.)	68%

In all, the university offers classical orchestras, intramural sports, and over 550 student organizations. 38 national and local Greek organizations are hosted on campus, with fraternity and sorority members representing 20% of the student population. The university operates on an academic quarter system, with three primary quarters beginning in late September and ending in mid-June. In 2015, 44% of undergraduate students received federal Pell Grants.

The undergraduate student body government is the Associated Students of the University of California, San Diego, organized as a cabinet and senate, while graduate students are represented by the Graduate Student Association, a proportional representative body with membership depending on the number of students in each graduate department. Additionally, graduate students who serve as teaching assistants are represented by the UC-wide union of Academic Student Employees. Each of the eight residential colleges has its own student council as well. Most student media publications distributed on-campus are services provided and governed by ASUCSD, including Triton Television, the school's student run film studio, and the KSDT radio station. A notable exception is The Guardian, which is directly governed by the university's Student Affairs department. Other student newspapers, include titles such as Black Voices, New Indicator (New Indicator Collective), Revellations, North star, Revelle Times, The New Wave, Sandscript, and Ujima.

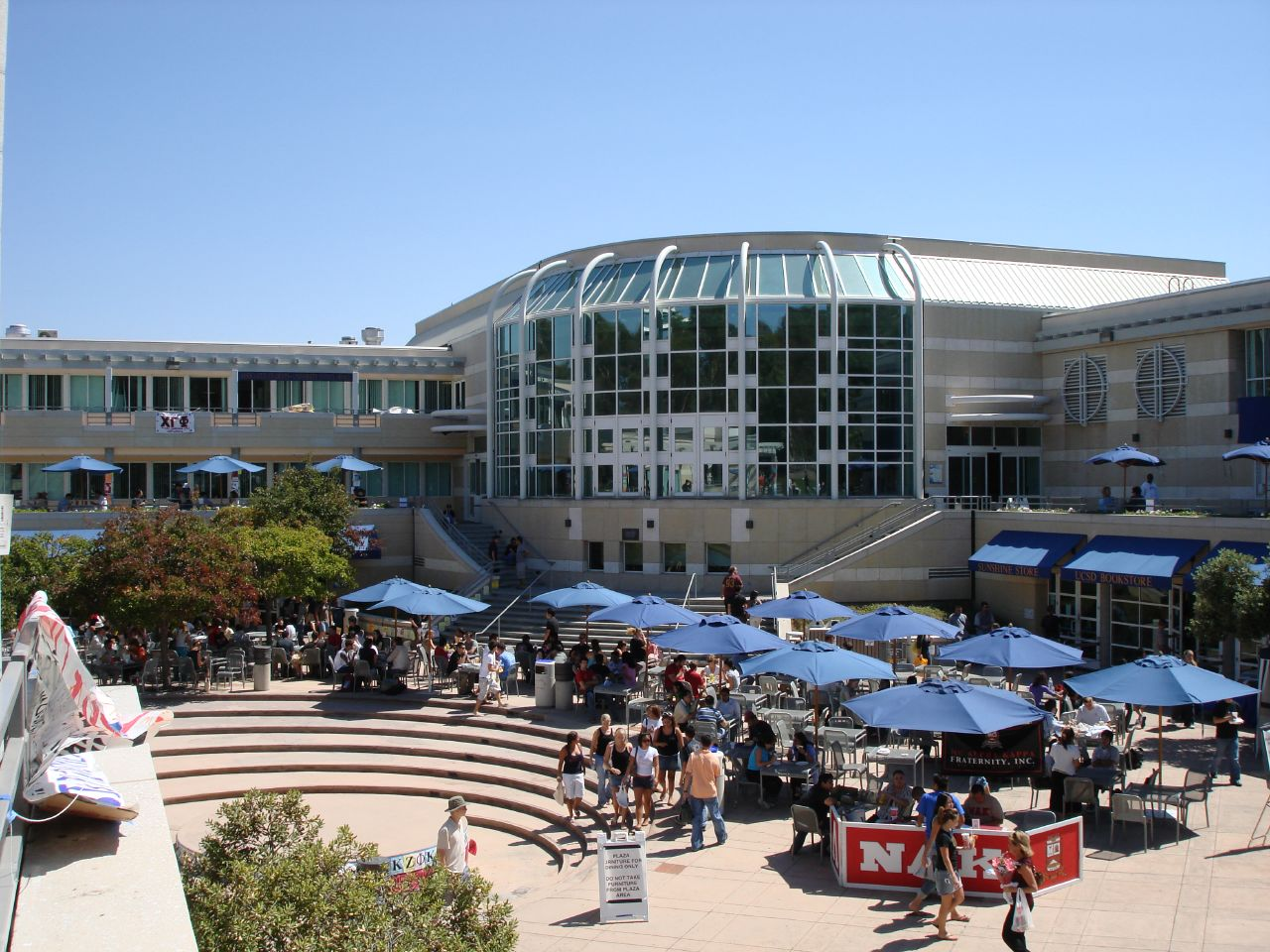
Price Center, September 2006

Price Center, often referred to as PC, is the main student hub and is located in the center of campus, just south of Geisel Library. The building houses restaurants, the central bookstore, a movie theater, and office space for student organizations and faculty. A student referendum was passed in 2003 to nearly double Price Center, this "East expansion" was officially opened to the public on May 19, 2008. Many campus cooperatives, stores as well as The Hub (UCSD's Basic Needs program) operate out of the Student Center which is located towards the south-east of campus.

There are also seven community resource centers that cultivate community among faculty, staff, and students: the Cross-Cultural Center, the Women's Center, the Student Veterans Resource Center, the Intertribal Resource Center, the Raza Resource Centro, the Black Resource Center and the LGBT Resource Center. UC San Diego was the last UC campus to have such centers. All three, especially the Cross-Cultural Center that was created first, were founded in the mid-1990s as a result of student movements that demanded change despite opposition by the campus administration.

In addition to these seven centers, in fall 2025 student groups including the Students' Civil Liberties Union and the Blind Snakes Co-operative advocated for a dedicated space, leading to increased budget support. Associated Students (A.S.) announced a permanent location for the Disability Resource Hub on the first floor of Pepper Canyon Hall, near the Office for Students with Disabilities and the Triton Testing Center, with a projected opening in Fall 2026.

The Ché Café is a student worker cooperative and social center that is perhaps best known for its role as a venue for underground music scene. It is an on-and-off again vegan cafe and catering operation as well. The Ché also acts as a resource for the music and art departments on campus through hosting art shows, performances, and film screenings. Some of the most notable touring bands or musicians who have played at the Ché include: Bon Iver, Green Day, Rise Against, Jimmy Eat World, Matt & Kim, Billy Corgan, Blonde Redhead, Bomb the Music Industry!, The Get Up Kids, Deerhoof, Bright Eyes, Chumbawamba, Mike Watt, Hella, Dan Deacon, Unwound, and Jawbreaker. Prominent local San Diego bands such as The Locust and Pinback, and national tours such as Mates of State and The Dillinger Escape Plan have given the Ché Café some fame and praise as a radical vegan collective despite its small size and limited sound equipment.

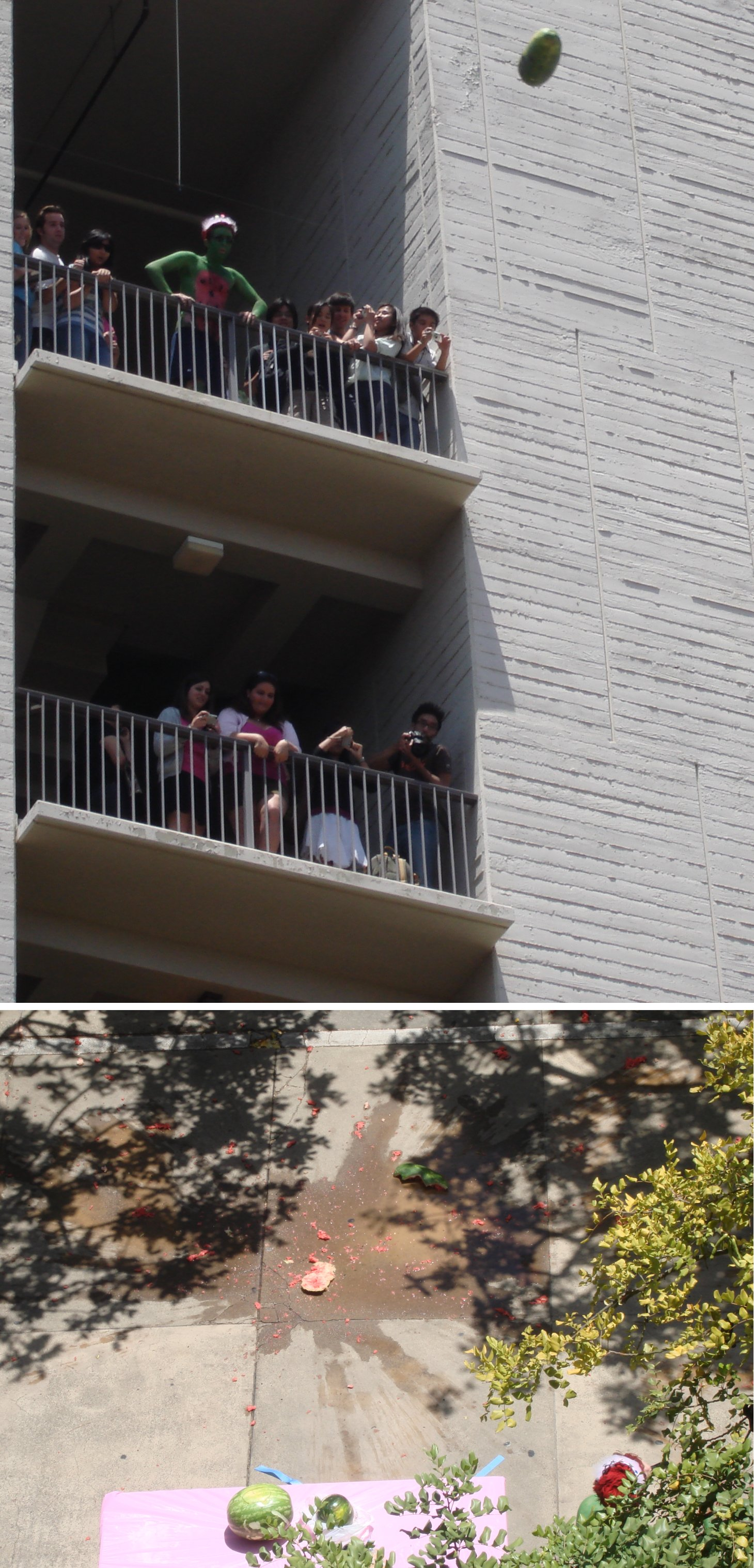
The June 2007 Watermelon Drop, an annual tradition at Revelle College

=== Former television station ===
K35DG-D channel 35, branded on-air as UCSD TV, was a low-powered, Class A UCTV-affiliated television station licensed owned by the University of California, San Diego. On cable, the station was carried on Spectrum digital channel 1231 and Cox digital channel 135. The transmitter was located atop Mount Soledad and aired public lectures, documentaries and fine arts programming from UCTV. In the Federal Communications Commission (FCC)'s incentive auction, K35DG-D sold its spectrum for $24,020,383; at the time, the station indicated that it would enter into a post-auction channel sharing agreement. K35DG-D ceased operations October 25, 2017, and its license was surrendered to the FCC for cancellation on October 27, 2017; UCSD TV continues to be carried on Cox, Spectrum, and AT&T.

=== Traditions ===
The student body government coordinates a wide variety of concerts and events during the year. UC San Diego begins the fall quarter with Welcome Week to introduce new students to campus clubs and activities, starting the week with the All Campus Dance. The Hullabaloo music festival takes place every November as part of the university's Founders' Celebration. Bear Garden, a carnival held near Price Center, takes place every quarter throughout the year. Additionally, events are frequently held at the Loft, a performance lounge within Price Center.

The Sun God Festival, named after the statue in the Stuart Collection, has become one of the largest annual campus events. It is held annually in mid-May. It has grown into a 20,000 person event, featuring an eclectic mix of art, dance, and musical performances.

The Watermelon Drop takes place at the end of the spring quarter. One of the campus' oldest traditions, it originated in 1965 from a physics exam question centering on the velocity on impact of a dropped object. A group of students pursued that line of thought by dropping a watermelon from the top floor of Revelle's Urey Hall and measured the distance from the splat to the farthest travelling piece of fruit.

=== Housing ===
There are eight undergraduate residential colleges. First-year students are usually housed in the residence halls while upperclassmen live in the college apartments. Transfer students are housed in separate facilities from the residential colleges, in an area called The Village at Pepper Canyon. The housing facilities vary in design, though nearly all of them are of modern or brutalist style. The vast majority of entering freshmen and about many undergraduates live on campus.

College	Founded	Motto	Emphasis	Writing Sequence	Dining Hall	Festival
Revelle College	1964	Purpose, Truth, Vision	Renaissance education	Humanities (HUM)	64 Degrees	Watermelon Drop Festival, Revellution
John Muir College	1967	Celebrating the Independent Spirit	Individual Choice	Muir College Writing Program (MCWP)	Pines, Roots	Muirstock
Thurgood Marshall College	1970	Developing the Scholar and the Citizen	Social responsibility	Dimensions of Culture (DOC)	OceanView	Marshallpalooza
Earl Warren College	1974	Toward a life of balance	Balanced education	Warren Writing (Warren College Writing Program) (WCWP), Ethics and Society (POLI/PHIL 27&28)	Canyon Vista	Warren Live!
Eleanor Roosevelt College	1988	Developing World Citizens Through Scholarship, Leadership, and Service	International studies	Making of the Modern World (MMW)	Ventanas	Rockin' Roosevelt
Sixth College	2001	Preparing Effective Citizens for the 21st Century	Connections between culture, art and technology	Culture, Art and Technology (CAT)	Restaurants at Sixth College	Chocolate Festival, Kuncocshun
Seventh College	2020	A Changing Planet	Environmental sustainability	Synthesis (SYN)	The Bistro at the Strand	N/A
Eighth College	2021	Engagement & Community	Solving issues within the local community and beyond	Critical Community Engagement (CCE)	N/A (None - Served by Revelle College's Facilities, including 64 Degrees)	N/A

Accommodations are made for students with specific needs. Undergraduate couples and families have the option of living in housing facilities that are normally available only to graduate students. The university also dedicates a portion of its facilities for those who wish to live in gender-neutral or LGBT housing.

Reflecting UC San Diego's diversity, International House, a complex of apartments located in Eleanor Roosevelt College, is dedicated to cross-cultural exchange between American and international students, housing about 350 students from more than 30 countries. International learning is fostered through formal programs including current affairs discussions, cultural nights, and a community newsletter. Upper-division undergraduates from all eight colleges, graduate students, faculty, and researchers are eligible to live in International House, located in the Eleanor Roosevelt College townhouses. Demand is very high for this special program and there is often a waitlist. Spaces in International House are not guaranteed and admission requires a separate application.

Housing plans also offer students access to dining facilities, which were named by PETA as the most vegan-friendly in the United States. As of 2025, each student living on campus, with few exceptions, is required to purchase a dining plan.

As of September 2025, UC San Diego had 24,500 beds in student housing, giving it the highest capacity in the United States tied with UCLA. The university currently offers two years guaranteed housing to both incoming freshmen and incoming transfer students, and it intends to reach capacity for a four-year housing guarantee.

=== Greek life ===
UC San Diego supports several fraternities and sororities. The university also sponsors a Multicultural Greek Council (MGC), which currently recognizes eight fraternities and seven sororities and has notable members such as startup founder Trent Stacy and DJ DEETS. Greek organizations at UC San Diego do not have chapter houses.

== Athletics ==
Men's sports	Women's sports
Baseball	Basketball
Basketball	Cross Country
Cross Country	Fencing
Fencing	Rowing
Golf	Soccer
Rowing	Softball
Soccer	Swimming & Diving
Swimming & Diving	Tennis
Tennis	Track & Field
Track & Field	Volleyball
Volleyball	Water Polo
Water Polo	Triathlon
Triathlon	

UCSD's teams compete at the university's RIMAC facility, Triton Ballpark, and LionTree Arena.

On November 27, 2017, the university announced that its athletic programs have begun a six-year transition process from NCAA Division II to Division I, where it became a member of the Big West Conference. As of 2017 most of UC San Diego's 23 intercollegiate varsity athletic teams still participate in Division II, 12-member California Collegiate Athletic Association, and some compete independently. The water polo, fencing, and men's volleyball teams compete as part of Division I conferences. Before joining Division II in 2000, the school participated at the Division III level.

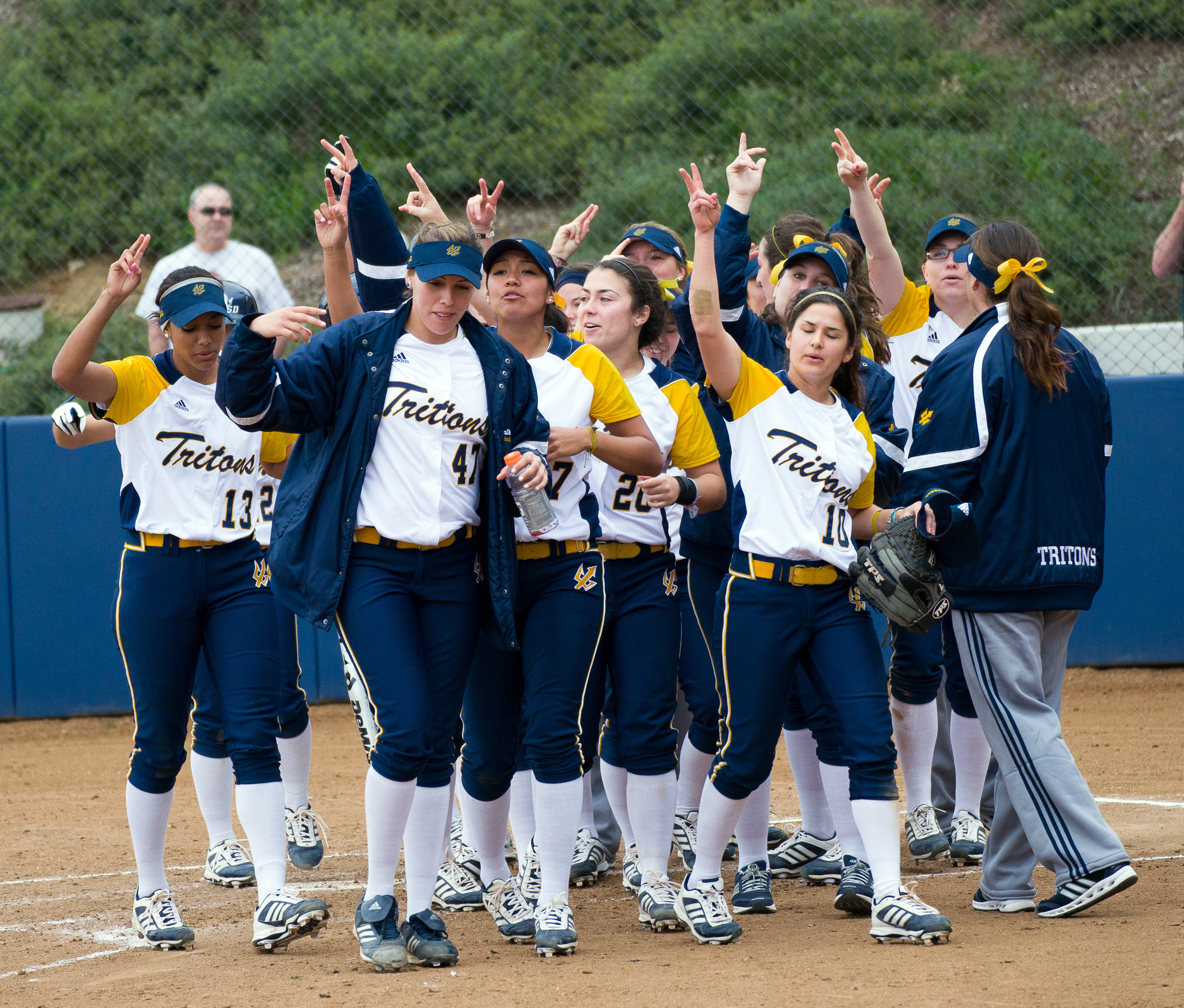
The Tritons softball team in 2013

In all, the Tritons have won a total of 30 national championships in golf, soccer, softball, tennis, volleyball, and water polo. The 2006–07 season was marked as UC San Diego's best since moving to Division II, with 19 athletic programs qualifying for post-season competition, including 17 for the NCAA Championships. Eight of those teams finished with a top five national ranking.

Until 2007, UC San Diego was the only Division II school that did not offer athletic scholarships. In 2005, the NCAA created a rule that made it mandatory for all D-II programs to award athletic grants. Consequently, a measure was proposed to begin offering $500 "grants-in-aid" to all 600 intercollegiate athletes in order to meet this requirement. A student referendum was passed in February 2007, authorizing a $329 annual student fee to fund a raise in coaches' salaries, hire more trainers, and provide all athletes with a $500 scholarship.

The athletic department considered a move to Division I in 2011. The student body would have needed to approve a doubling of student fees to allow the university to meet minimum scholarship requirements for D-I participation. However, students overwhelmingly rejected this measure in 2012, halting any efforts for a move to Division I at that time.

On May 24, 2016, students at UC San Diego passed the vote to move their athletics to NCAA Division I. The school's newspaper, The Guardian, reported that voter turnout was 35 percent of the undergraduate population, when the measure only needed 20 percent to pass.

The university offers 30 sports club teams, including badminton, baseball, cycling, dancesport, ice hockey, lacrosse, rugby, sailing, soccer, snow skiing, tennis, volleyball, ultimate, water polo, and waterskiing. The UC San Diego surf team has won the national championship six times and is consistently rated one of the best surfing programs in the United States. UC San Diego does not have a football team. However, the university participated in intercollegiate football for one year during the 1968 season. The newly recruited Tritons lost all seven games that they played.

== Administration ==
=== List of chancellors ===
The following persons have served as the chancellor of UC San Diego:

No.	Portrait	Chancellor	Term start	Term end	Refs.
1		Herbert York	February 18, 1961	November 30, 1964	
2		John Semple Galbraith	December 1, 1964	June 20, 1968	
3		William J. McGill	June 21, 1968	August 31, 1970	
Acting		Herbert York	September 1, 1970	January 31, 1972	
4		William D. McElroy	February 1, 1972	June 30, 1980	
5		Richard C. Atkinson (Note: Atkinson left UCSD to become UC president)	July 1, 1980	September 30, 1995	
Interim		Marjorie Caserio	October 1, 1995	June 30, 1996	
6		Robert C. Dynes (Note: Dynes left UCSD to become UC president)	July 1, 1996	October 1, 2003	
Acting		Marsha Chandler	October 2, 2003	August 15, 2004	
7		Marye Anne Fox	August 16, 2004	June 2012	
8		Pradeep Khosla	August 1, 2012	present	

Table notes:

== Alumni ==
Notable UC San Diego living alumni include:
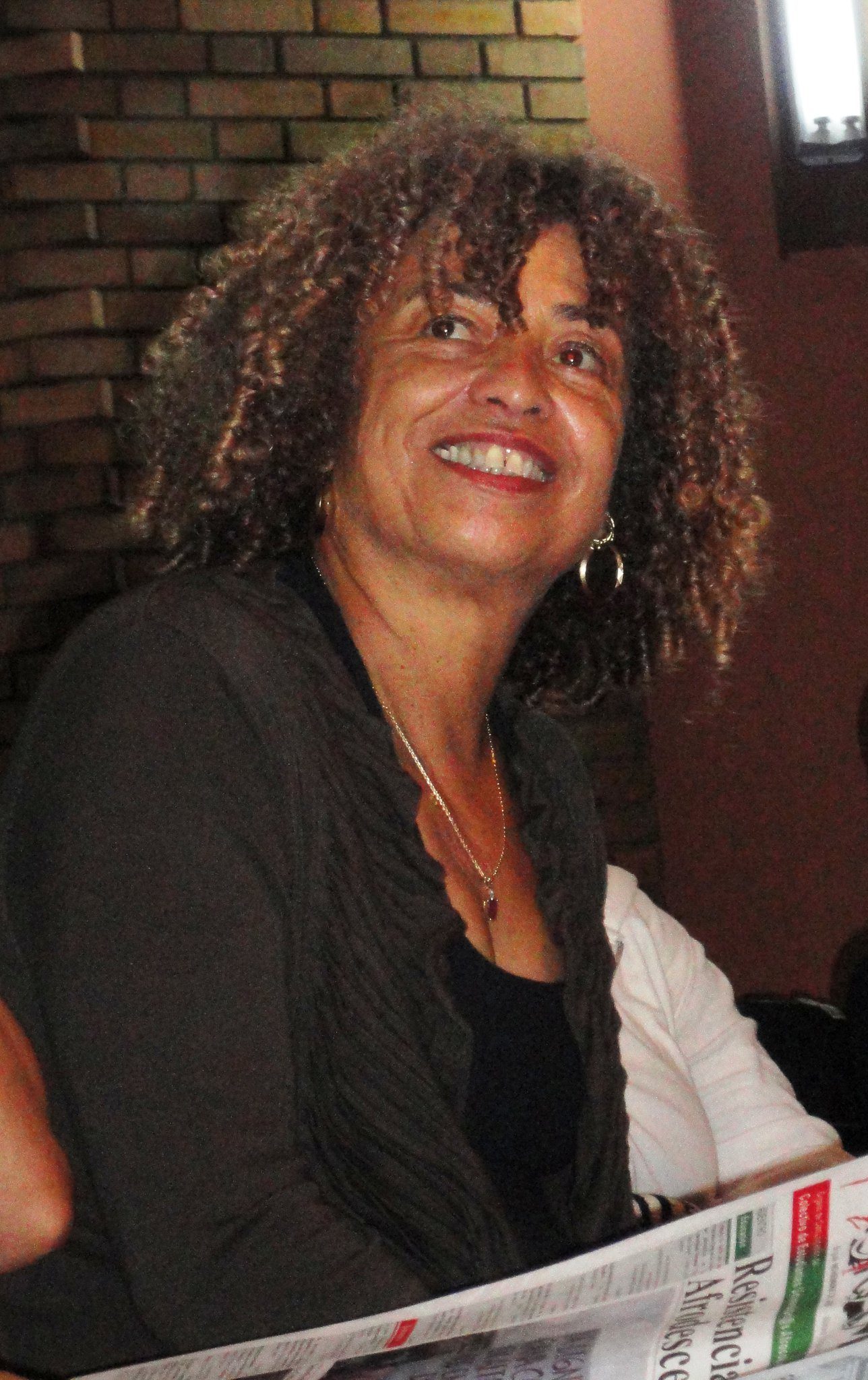
Angela Davis
American professor known for her political activism, establishment of the Critical Resistance, and speeches on social justice (MA, Philosophy)

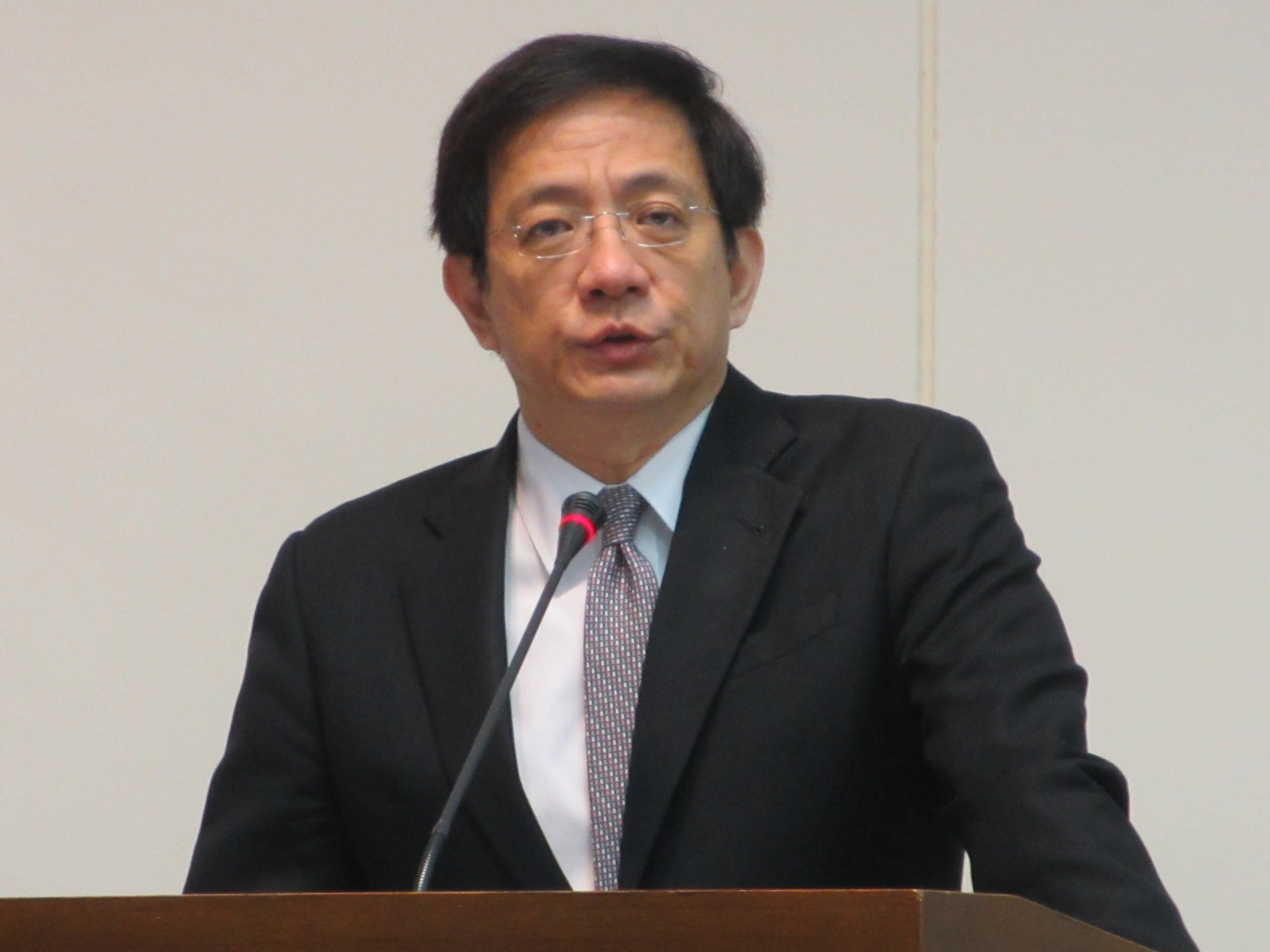
Kuan Chung-ming
Taiwanese Former Minister of the National Development Council and the Council for Economic Planning and Development, Professor of Finance at National Taiwan University (PhD, Economics)

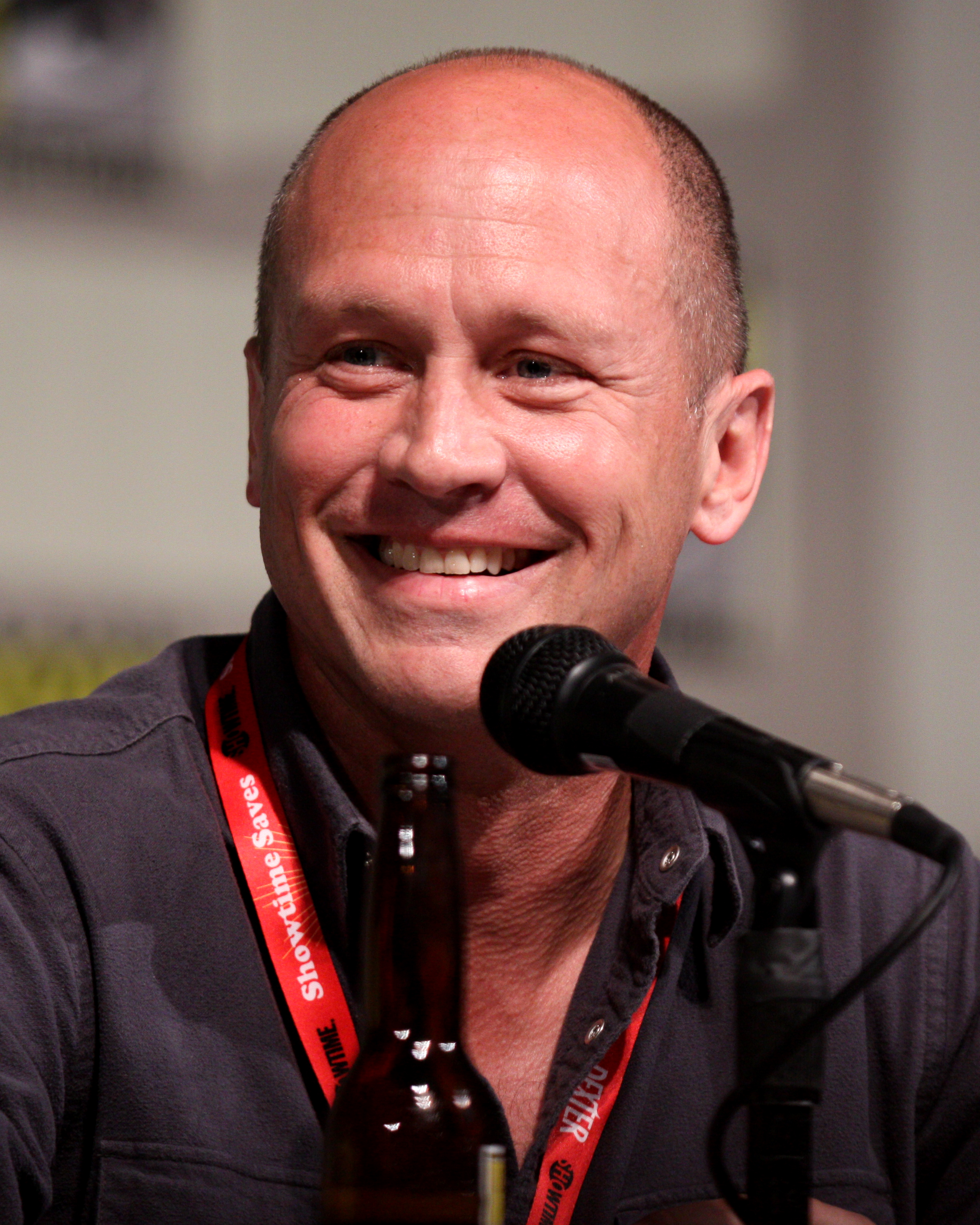
Mike Judge
Primetime Emmy Award winner and creator of Beavis and Butt-Head, King of the Hill, and Silicon Valley (BS, Physics)

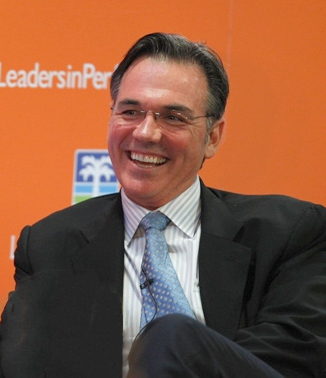
Billy Beane
President of the Oakland Athletics, former professional MLB athlete, and known for his depiction in Moneyball (BA, Economics)

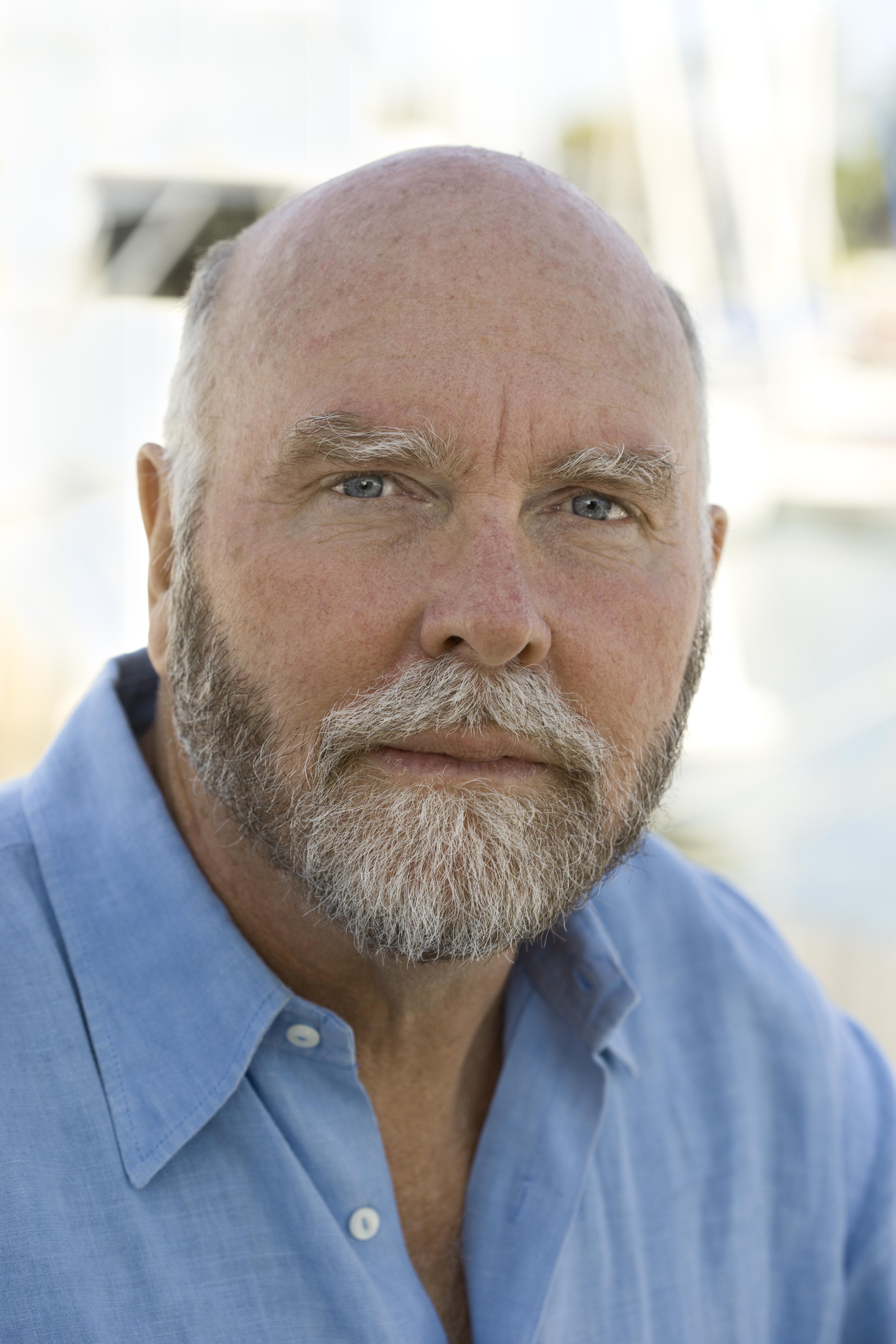
Craig Venter
Professor of Genomics at Buffalo known for sequencing the second human genome, contributing to the Human Genome Project, and establishing The Institute for Genomic Research (BS & PhD, Biomedical Sciences)

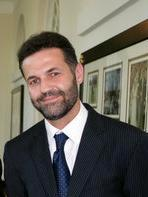
Khaled Hosseini
Physician known for setting forth medicine in Afghanistan for the George W. Bush administration, the United Nations, and production of novels such as The Kite Runner (MD, Medicine)

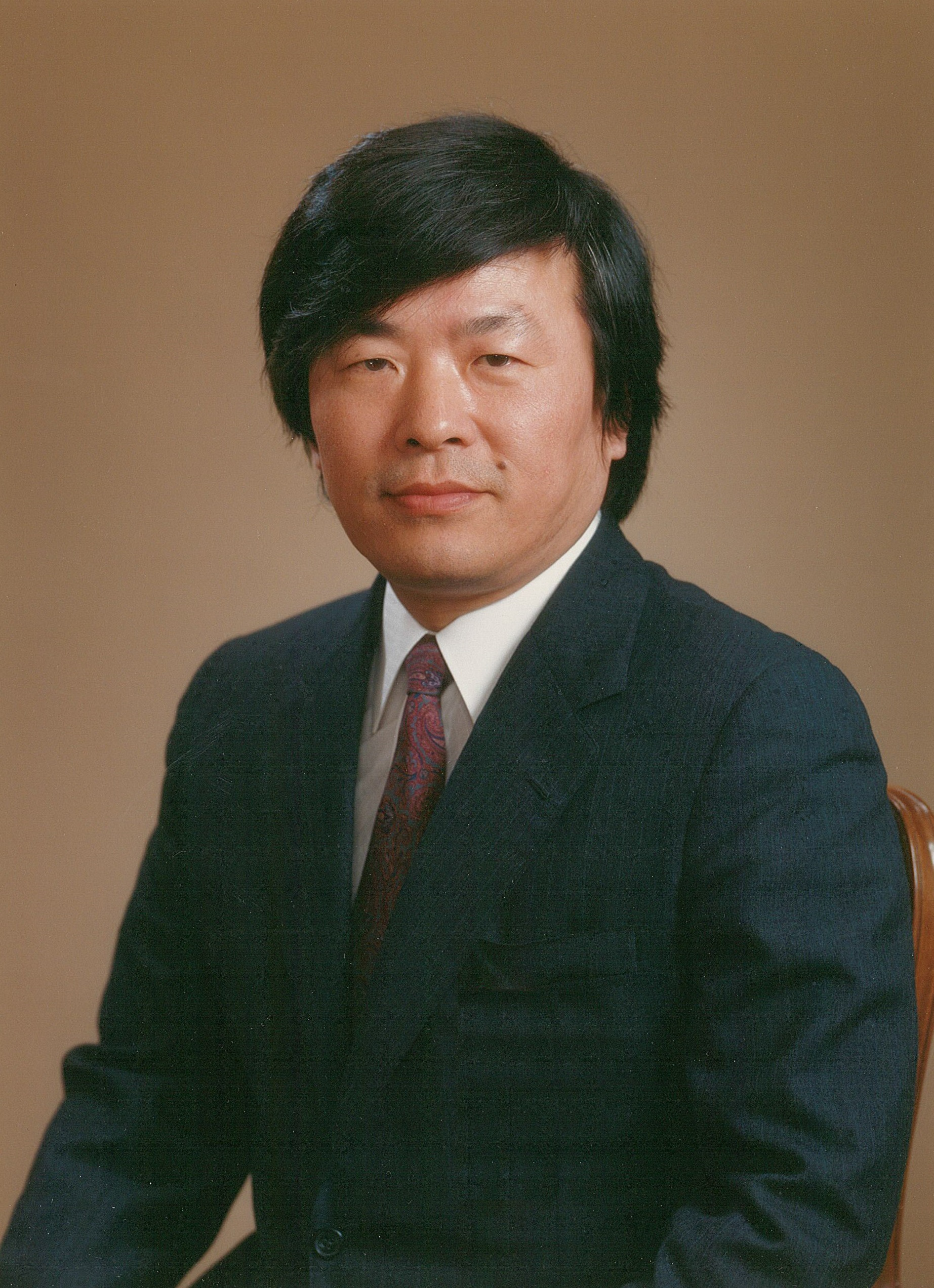
Susumu Tonegawa
Winner of the Nobel Prize in Medicine, Founder of the Picower Institute for Learning and Memory at MIT, Former director of the RIKEN Brain Science Institute (PhD, Biology)

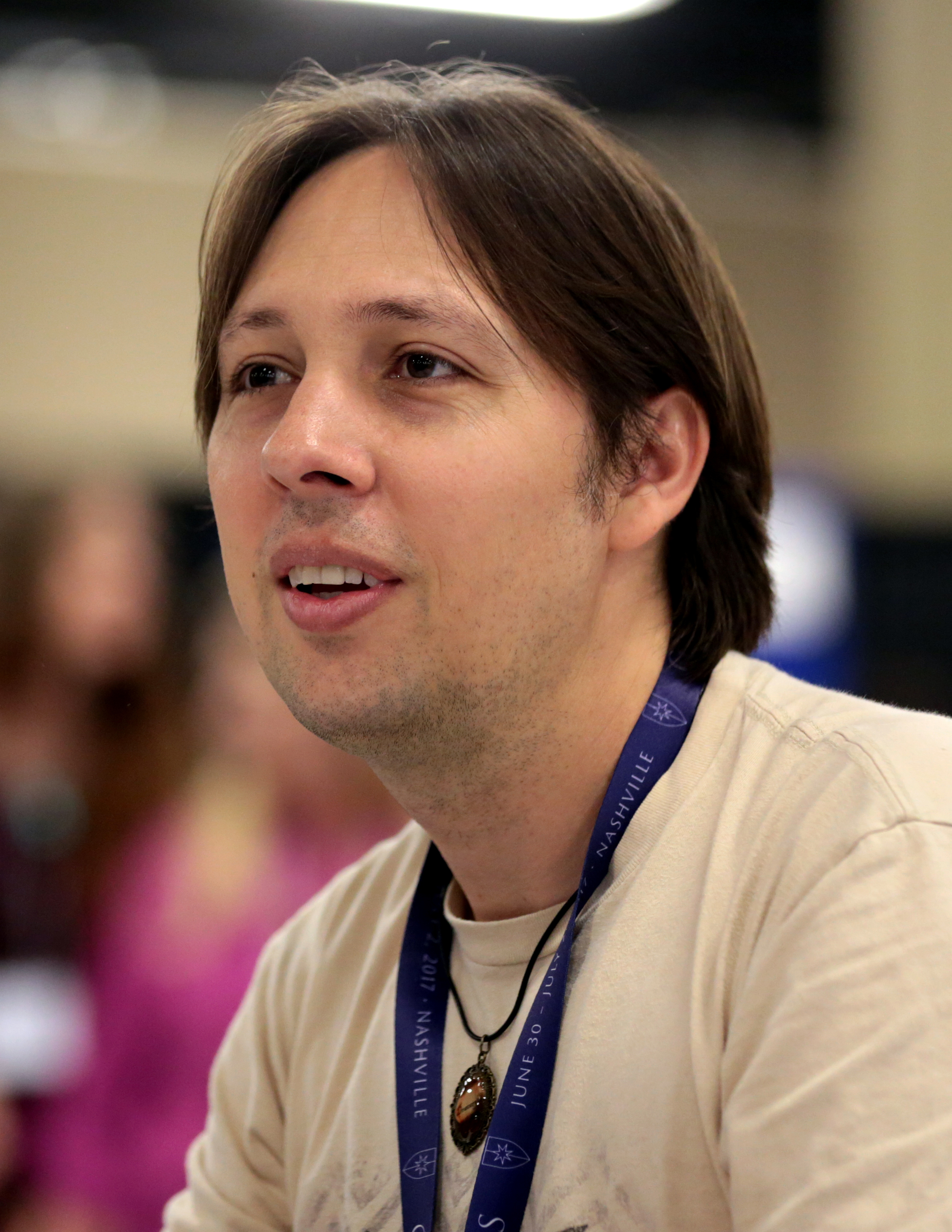
David J. Peterson
American language creator, writer, and artist, who has constructed languages for television and movies such as Thor: The Dark World, Doctor Strange, and the Dothraki and Valyrian languages for the television series Game of Thrones. (MA, Linguistics)

UC San Diego faculty, researchers, and alumni have won 28 Nobel Prizes, 3 Fields Medals, 8 National Medals of Science, 8 MacArthur Fellowships and 4 Pulitzer Prizes. Additionally, of faculty past and present, 41 have been elected to the National Academy of Engineering, 110 to the National Academy of Sciences, 36 to the National Academy of Medicine and 130 to the American Academy of Arts and Sciences.

== See also ==
- TRI-D (rocket engine)
- S*, a collaboration between seven universities and the Karolinska Institutet for training in bioinformatics and genomics
- List of astronauts educated at the University of California
