= Protest (disambiguation) =

A protest is an expression of objection, by words or by actions, to particular events, policies or situations.

Protest may also refer to:

- Protest (album), a 1977 album by Bunny Wailer
- Protest (EP), a 2002 EP by The Dears
- Protest (film), a 1967 Croatian film
- Protest (play), a 20th-century Czech play
- Protest!, a clandestine leaflet issued in 1942 in Poland
- Pro-Test, a British group that promoted and supported animal testing in medical research

Protest types and protest-related terms

- Counter-protest, a protest action which takes place within the proximity of an ideologically opposite protest
- Protest art, creative works produced by activists and social movements
- Protest camp, physical camps that are set up by activists
- Protest cycle, refers to the cyclical rise and fall in the social movement activity
- Protest permit, permission granted by a governmental agency for a demonstration
- Protest song, a song that is associated with a movement for social change
- Protest vote, a vote cast in an election to demonstrate dissatisfaction
- Road protest, various events
- Silent protest, an organized effort where the participants stay quiet to demonstrate disapproval
- Sea protest, that which protects a charterer or shipowner from claims of damage caused by the perils of the sea
- Street protest, another term for a demonstration (political)
- Student protest, a wide range of activities that indicate student dissatisfaction with a given political or academics issue
- Tax protester, someone who refuses to pay a tax claiming that the tax laws are unconstitutional or otherwise invalid

See also

- Protest the Hero, a Canadian progressive metal band
- Protest Records, an online record label that creates mp3 compilation albums
- Protest Warrior, a conservative political activist group
- Protestantism, the second largest form of Christianity
- Protesters against the 1649 Scottish Act of Classes
- Protested game, an objection raised by a manager in baseball
- Protestware, a form of hacktivism utilizing malware

== See also ==
- Procession (disambiguation)
