= Commotion =

Commotion may refer to:

- Commotion (animation), an animation and visual effects application
- Commotion (horse), a thoroughbred racehorse
- Commotion (radio show), a Canadian radio program
- Commotion Wireless, an open-source wireless mesh network
- "Commotion" (song), a song by Creedence Clearwater Revival on the 1969 album Green River
