= Seventh College =

Undergraduate college at UC San Diego

- University of California, San Diego
- Motto: A Changing Planet
- Established: 2019
- Status: Undergraduate
- Colors: Seventh Gold
- Provost: Kate Antonovics
- Website: seventh.ucsd.edu

Seventh College is an undergraduate residential college at the University of California, San Diego. Its primary focus is on interdisciplinary education. Seventh College admitted its first students in fall 2020.

== History ==
Planning for Seventh College began in 2017 to decompress existing colleges and accommodate anticipated growth.

Seventh College's current residential area was built in 2011 as the Village at Torrey Pines, intended to be a community for transfer students. With UC Board of Regents' approval of Seventh College, the Village for transfer students was moved to Pepper Canyon (previously the residential area for Sixth College) and Rita Atkinson (previously graduate housing), and Seventh College was established in the Village's original campus. For this reason, Seventh College consists entirely of apartments rather than a mix of residence hall suites and apartments.
