= Halıcıoğlu School of Data Science and Computing =

School of UC San Diego

UC San Diego Halıcıoğlu School of Data Science and Computing
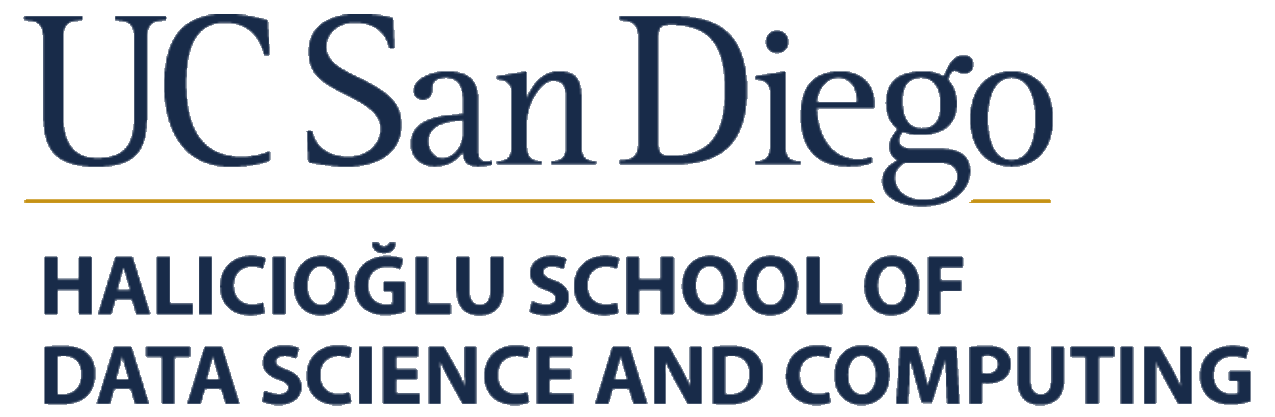
- Type: Public
- Established: July 18, 2024; 22 months ago
- Affiliation: University of California, San Diego
- Location: San Diego, California, United States
- Website: hsdsc.ucsd.edu

The UC San Diego Halıcıoğlu School of Data Sciences and Computing (HSDSC) is the youngest school at the University of California, San Diego and is focused on data science, artificial intelligence, and computing education and research. Its establishment was approved in July 2024 by the University of California Board of Regents. The School brings together the preexisting Halıcıoğlu Data Science Institute and the San Diego Supercomputer Center. It is named after UC San Diego alumnus Taner Halıcıoğlu.

== History ==
The proposal for the school was submitted on March 24, 2022. The University of California Board of Regents approved the creation of the school on July 18, 2024.

In December 2024, UCSD announced that it formed a consortium with Ahmedabad University and IIT Gandhinagar to launch an institute to be named the GIFT International Fintech Institute. That institute would be located in GIFT City, Gujarat, India. As part of this, the consortium is expected to build on SCIDS, which serves as the consortium's tech arm.

As of 2025, it has 50 faculty members, and 5 more are expected to join in fall 2025.

== Programs ==
The school builds on the San Diego Supercomputer Center and the Halicioğlu Data Science Institute, and uses both buildings. Its interim dean is Rajesh K. Gupta. As of 2025, the school provides bachelor's, master's, and PhD programs in data science as well as a MAS in data science in engineering.
