= TRI-D (rocket engine) =

Rocket engine 3D printed in 2013

- Country of origin: United States
- Manufacturer: Students for the Exploration and Development of Space
- Application: 3rd stage of 3 Stage Cubesat

Liquid-fuel engine
- Propellant: LOX / RP-1 (rocket grade kerosene)

Performance
- Thrust, sea-level: 0.89 kN (200 lbf)

TRI-D is a 3D printed metal rocket engine. Students from the Students for the Exploration and Development of Space at University of California, San Diego (SEDS at UC San Diego) built the metal rocket engine using a technique previously confined to NASA, using a GPI Prototype and Manufacturing Services printer via the Direct metal laser sintering (DMLS) method. UCSD students were the first group in the world to 3D print a rocket engine of its size, other than NASA as of February 2014. The Tri-D engine cost US$6,800.

== Development ==
The Tri-D rocket engine was designed and built with the cooperation of NASA’s Marshall Space Flight Center, to explore the feasibility of printed rocket components. It was designed to power the third stage of a Nanosat or Cubesat launcher, i.e. an engine capable of launching satellites that weigh less than 1.33 kg (2.93 lb).

== Specifications ==
Tri-D is around 17.7 cm long and weighs around 4.5 kg. It was fabricated using a chromium-cobalt alloy powder. The propellants are kerosene and liquid oxygen. The engine produces about 200 pounds-force (890 newtons; 91 kilograms-force) thrust. According to Gizmag "the injector has a Fuel-Oxidizer-Oxidizer-Fuel inlet arrangement with two outer fuel orifices converging with two inner oxidizer orifices".

The engine has a regenerative cooling jacket that extends to the nozzle to prevent the engine from overheating while firing. The combustion chamber was designed to burn the propellants in the middle of the chamber and keep as much heat generated as possible away from its chamber walls, while at the same time insulating the wall with a film of cooler gases.

== Printer ==
The engine was printed with a GPI Prototype and Manufacturing Services printer using a technique called Direct metal laser sintering (DMLS). In the process of printing, a powder of the chromium-cobalt alloy is spread in a thin layer. Then computer-controlled laser fuses the powders into a cross section of the engine component. The machine then spreads a second layer of powder and the process continuously repeats until each component is complete. Any excess powder is removed as are temporary supports that were printed to hold the components together during printing process. Finally it is hardened, polished and assembled.

== Test firing ==
The test firing at Mojave went without any problems and the engine exhaust achieved 200 pounds-force (890 newtons; 91 kilograms-force) thrust. The team claimed "it was a resounding success and could be the next step in the development of cheaper propulsion systems and a commercializing of space".

=== Injector test ===
On a separate engine, a 3D printed injector was test fired in a conventionally manufactured engine. In the test of the injector on August 22, 2014, the engine generated 20,000 pounds-force (89,000 newtons; 9,100 kilograms-force) thrust.
