= Commotion (animation) =

Visual effects application, originally by Puffin Designs

Commotion is a visual effects application, originally released by Puffin Designs. Puffin Designs was founded by Scott Squires (Visual Effects Supervisor at Industrial Light and Magic) and Forest Key to market Commotion.

The software was available in standard and professional editions, and was the first desktop application to allow real-time playback of full quality video clips from RAM.

Puffin Designs was later acquired by Pinnacle in 2000. After another release, Pinnacle let the program languish. Pinnacle has since been acquired by Avid, who shows no signs of reviving the product. The last release was version 4.1. Apple Computer briefly bundled a limited version of the program with Final Cut Pro.
