= Road protest =

Road protest may be synonymous with highway revolts. It may also refer to:

- Fukushima incident (1882)
- 1960s–1970s US Freeway and expressway revolts
- 1990s Road protest in the United Kingdom
  - Dongas road protest group
  - Twyford Down (1991/1992)
  - M11 link road protest (1993/1994)
  - Newbury bypass (1996)
- Rimrose Valley#Highway proposals (2017)
- M3 motorway (Ireland) (2007)
- Reclaim the Streets

== See also ==
- Category:Anti-road protests
- Direct action
