= Procession (sculpture) =

1982 mural and sculpture in Eugene, Oregon, U.S.

- Part of the mural in October 2015
- Artists: Dallas Cole; Scott Wylie
- Year: 1982
- Type: Mural; sculpture
- Medium: Brick; tile
- Condition: "Treatment needed" (1993)
- Location: Eugene, Oregon, United States; 44.05247°N 123.09232°W

Procession, also known as The Procession, is a 1982 mural and sculpture by artists Dallas Cole and Scott Wylie, with additional contributions by Jill Perry and Joanne Haines, installed outside the Hilton Hotel in Eugene, Oregon, in the United States.

== Description and history ==
Procession (September 1982) is an outdoor sculpture conceived and created by Dallas Cole with the assistance of Scott Wylie, who designed the bricks and tiles surrounding the episodes depicted in ceramic high relief mosaic. It is installed outside the west entrance of the Hilton Hotel's Conference Center. Additional contributions were made by Jill Perry and Joanne Haines. It depicts five figures, including two dancers, two water bearers, and one person surrounded by five birds and a turtle; the intricate background includes grapes and leaves, with a silhouette in tiles that echoes the Coburg Hills surrounding Eugene. The mural measures 10 feet (3.0 m), 4 inches (10 cm) x 30 feet (9.1 m), 6 inches (15 cm). One plaque set into the work reads, SEPTEMBER, 1982 / DALLAS COLE / SCOTT WYLIE / JILL PERRY / JOANNE HAINES. An indoor plaque nearby reads, PROCESSION / DALLAS WILLIAMS COLE / 1982.

The sculpture was surveyed and deemed "treatment needed" by the Smithsonian Institution's "Save Outdoor Sculpture!" program in October 1993. It was administered by the Cultural Services Division of the City of Eugene's Recreation and Cultural Services Department at that time.

== See also ==
- 1982 in art
