= Hullabaloo (festival) =

- Genre: various
- Dates: mid-November
- Location: UC San Diego
- Years active: 2011–2019, 2021–
- Attendance: 7,000
- Website: http://hullabaloo.ucsd.edu

Hullabaloo is an annual campus music festival at the University of California, San Diego. It has been a part of the university's Founders' Celebration every November since 2011, when it was created to replace its predecessor, FallFest. There was no festival in 2020 due to the COVID-19 pandemic.

== Festival format ==
Hullabaloo takes place in the University Center neighborhood of UC San Diego, just south of Price Center. Headliners perform on a stage erected in Town Square, with student organization booths and food trucks surrounding the square. The adjoining Matthews Quad is converted into a carnival area with four rides: the Kamikaze, the Zipper, the Round Up, and a zip line.

== Past lineups ==
- 2011: Felix Cartal, Jokers of the Scene, DJ Philly, DJ Stu
- 2012: The M Machine, XV, Chris Kutz
- 2013: Chance the Rapper, Kennedy Jones, Ali, Jun
- 2014: Logic, Erik Hassle, Conway, Avery
- 2015: Lil Dicky, David Choi, The Young Wild
- 2016: Isaiah Rashad, Andrew Luce, Tennyson
- 2017: O.T. Genasis, courtship., Pham
- 2018: Saba, Vincent, Leland
