= Elizabeth Davies =

Betty, Libby, Liz or Elizabeth Davies may refer to:

== Political figures ==
- Libby Davies (born 1953), Canadian MP from Vancouver
- Liz Davies (born 1963), English barrister and political activist

== Others ==
- Elizabeth Harriet Davies (1831–1887) British sailor who participated in the American Civil War as a man
- Elizabeth Valerie Davies (1912–2001), Welsh swimmer at 1932 Summer Olympics; a/k/a Valerie Davies and Valerie Latham
- Betty Davies (radio) (1917–2018), British radio drama producer and director
- Betty Ann Davies (1910–1955), English stage, film and TV actress
- Elizabeth Davies (nurse) (1789–1860)
- Elizabeth Davies (criminal), associate of Jenny Diver

== See also ==
- Elizabeth Davies-Colley
- Elizabeth Davis (disambiguation)
- Lisa Davies (disambiguation)
