= Sylvia L. Thrupp =

American historian

Sylvia Lettice Thrupp (3 September 1903, Surbiton, UK – 9 September 1997) was an English-born, Canadian-American medievalist, comparative historian and social scientist. She is sometimes described as a "foremother of medievalists."

== Early life and education ==
In 1909, Sylvia Thrupp, with her parents, sister, and brother, immigrated to Kamloops, British Columbia from England.

In 1921, Thrupp matriculated at the University of British Columbia (UBC), where she graduated in 1925 with a First Class honors B.A. in history. After studying for a Diploma in Education, granted in 1926, she taught for two years in high schools. In 1928 she obtained a part-time assistantship in UBC's history department and studied there for her M.A., completed in 1929. Her 97-page M.A. thesis, supervised by Walter Noble Sage (1888–1971), is entitled History of the Cranbook District in East Kootenary. in 1929 Thrupp obtained a scholarship to study at the University of London, where she was taught by Hilda Johnstone, Eliza Jeffries Davis, and Michael Postan. Thrupp began work on her doctoral thesis under the supervision of John E. Neale. Her thesis A Study of the Merchant Class of Medieval London in the Fifteenth Century with special reference to the Company of Grocers was completed in June 1931. Her examiners in her defense of her thesis were Michael Postan, Arthur Hermann Thomas (1877–1971), and Eileen Power (who was for many years a friend and mentor to Sylvia Thrupp). During the years 1931–1934 Thrupp received very little scholarship money and struggled financially. She might have received a small commission for her 1933 book A short history of the Worshipful Company of Bakers of London. For the academic year 1934–1935, she received a fellowship from Canada's Social Sciences and Humanities Research Council to visit American universities (Columbia U., Harvard U., Yale U., U. Michigan, and U. Chicago) and study aspects of history and social sciences.

== Career ==
Thrupp encountered considerable academic misogyny in attempting to find permanent employment at institutions such as McGill University and the University of Toronto. Thrupp was, from 1935 to 1944, an instructor in history at the University of British Columbia and for the academic year 1944–1945, a special lecturer in history at the University of Toronto. For the academic year 1944–1945, she was awarded a Guggenheim Fellowship upon written recommendations made by Michael Postan, Frank Knight, N. S. B. Gras, Edwin Francis Gay, R. M. MacIver, and Frederic C. Lane. From 1945 to 1961, at the University of Chicago, Thrupp was an assistant professor and then an associate professor.

Thrupp's 1948 book The merchant class of medieval London, 1300-1500 established an outstanding reputation for her in medieval urban history. In 1958, she established the journal Comparative Studies in Society and History (CSSH), which for several years was a one-person operation. The initial issues of CSSH dealt primarily with history, sociology, and anthropology. In 1961 she was appointed to the University of Michigan's newly established Alice Freeman Palmer Chair of History (funded by the American Association of University Women (AAUW). At the University of Michigan, Thrupp held her professorial chair and continued as editor-in-chief of CSSH until her retirement as professor emerita in 1974.

== Personal life ==
At the age of 83, in 1986, Thrupp married a fellow medievalist, Joseph Reese Strayer, whose first wife died in February 1984. He retired in 1962 from Princeton University as professor emeritus. Joseph and Sylvia Strayer lived in Princeton, New Jersey for about year until he died in July 1987. After his death, she moved to California to live with her nephew, Lauri D. Trupp, M.D. She died in 1997 after suffering from Alzheimer's disease for a number of years.

== Awards and honors ==
Thrupp was from 1973 to 1974 the president of the Economic History Association She was elected a Fellow of the Royal Historical Society and in 1979 a Fellow of the American Academy of Arts and Sciences. In 1981 Thrupp was elected a Fellow of the Medieval Academy of America. In 2000, the University of Michigan established as a memorial to her the Sylvia L. Thrupp Collegiate Professorship of Comparative History. In May 2006, the Medieval Midwest History Conference sponsored a session in her memory at the 41st International Medieval Congress in Kalamazoo, Michigan.

== Selected publications ==
=== Articles ===
- Thrupp, Sylvia L. (1941). "Social Control in the Medieval Town". The Journal of Economic History. 1: 39–52. doi:10.1017/S0022050700052153.
- Thrupp, Sylvia L. (1942). "Medieval Gilds Reconsidered". The Journal of Economic History. 2 (2): 164–173. doi:10.1017/S0022050700052554.
- Thrupp, Sylvia L. (1943). "The Problem of Conservatism in Fifteenth-Century England". Speculum. 18 (3): 363–368. doi:10.2307/2853711. JSTOR 2853711.
- Thrupp, Sylvia L. (1957). "A Survey of the Alien Population of England in 1440". Speculum. 32 (2): 262–273. doi:10.2307/2849117. JSTOR 2849117.
- Thrupp, Sylvia L. (1957). "The Role of Comparison in the Development of Economic Theory". The Journal of Economic History. 17 (4): 554–570. doi:10.1017/S0022050700079110.
- Thrupp, Sylvia L. (1959). "Hierarchy, Illusion and Social Mobility". Comparative Studies in Society and History. 2: 126–128. doi:10.1017/S001041750000058X.
- Thrupp, Sylvia L. (1961). "The Creativity of Cities: A Review Article". Comparative Studies in Society and History. 4: 53–64. doi:10.1017/S0010417500001225.
- Thrupp, Sylvia L. (1962). "Economy and Society in Medieval England". Journal of British Studies. 2: 1–13. doi:10.1086/385451.
- Thrupp, Sylvia L. (1965). "The Problem of Replacement-Rates in Late Medieval English Population". The Economic History Review. 18 (1): 101–119. doi:10.2307/2591876. JSTOR 2591876.
- Thrupp, Sylvia L. (1966). "Plague Effects in Medieval Europe". Comparative Studies in Society and History. 8 (4): 474–483. doi:10.1017/S0010417500004242.
- Thrupp, Sylvia L. (1975). "Comparative Study in the Barnyard". The Journal of Economic History. 35: 1–7. doi:10.1017/S0022050700094262.

=== Books ===
- Thrupp, Sylvia L. (1933). A short history of the Worshipful Company of Bakers of London. Croydon, England: Galleon Press. LCCN 34035459; xiii+207 pages
- Thrupp, Sylvia L. (1948). The merchant class of medieval London, 1300-1500. Chicago: University of Chicago Press. LCCN 48003697; xix+401 pages
  - Thrupp, Sylvia L. (1989). The Merchant Class of Medieval London, 1300-1500. University of Michigan Press. ISBN 0-472-06072-4; pbk with a new introduction
- Thrupp, Sylvia L., ed. (1962). Millennial dreams in action; studies in revolutionary religious movements. Comparative studies in society and history. Supplement 2. The Hague: Mouton. LCCN 63000231.
  - 1970 edition. New York: Schocken Books. LCCN 70107614; This volume is the outcome of a conference held at the University of Chicago on April 8th and 9th, 1960 ... Some of the papers were made available in draft form beforehand but since have been revised; others were not written until after the conference.
- Thrupp, Sylvia L., ed. (1964). Change in medieval society, Europe north of the Alps, 1050-1500. New York: Appleton-Century-Crofts (acquired by Prentice Hall in 1973). LCCN 64013697.
  - 1988 edition. Michigan University Press. January 1988. ISBN 0-8020-6699-2. entry at University of Toronto website
- Thrupp, Sylvia L., ed. (1967). Early medieval society. New York: Appleton-Century-Crofts. LCCN 67012835; xii+260 pages
- Thrupp, Sylvia L. (1977). Grew, Raymond; Steneck, Nicholas H. (eds.). Society and History: Essays. Ann Arbor: University of Michigan Press. ISBN 0472088807. LCCN 75031056; 363 pages; Chronological list of the author's works: pp. 347-349
