= Betty Davies =

Betty Davies may refer to:

- Betty Ann Davies (1910–1955), British stage and film actress
- Betty Davies (radio) (1917–2018), British radio drama producer and director

== See also ==
- Betty Davis (disambiguation)
- Bette Davis (1908–1989), American actress
