= Geisel Library =

Library at the University of California, San Diego

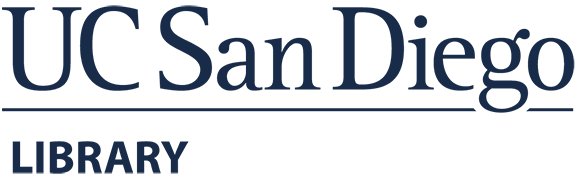

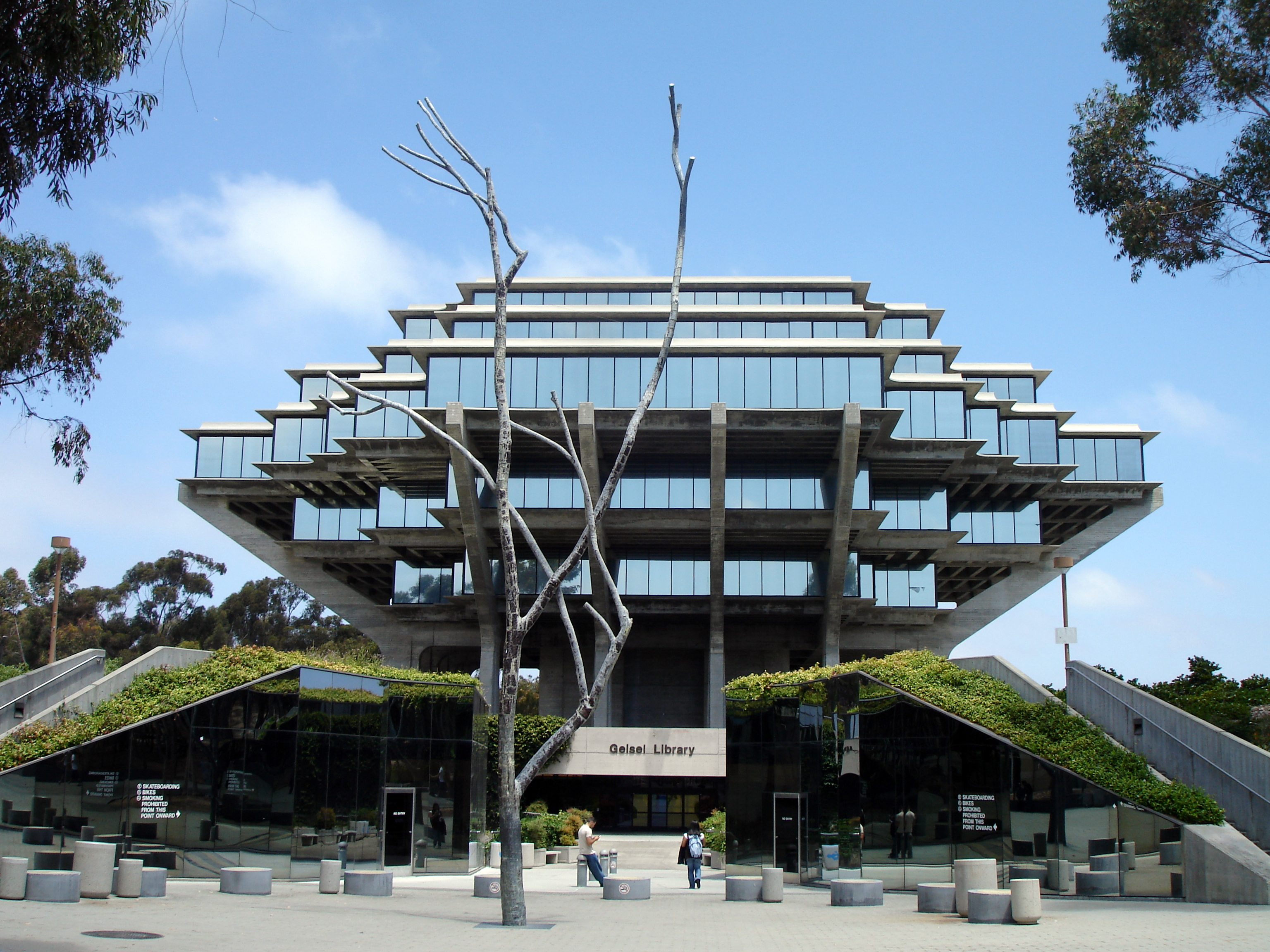
- Former names: Central Library, University Library

General information
- Architectural style: Brutalist / Futurist
- Location: San Diego, California, United States
- Coordinates: 32.88116°N 117.237651°W
- Construction started: 1968
- Completed: 1970
- Renovated: 1993
- Cost: $5.12 million
- Client: University of California San Diego

Height
- Height: 110 ft (34 m)

Dimensions
- Diameter: 200 ft (61 m)

Technical details
- Structural system: Reinforced concrete
- Floor count: 8

Design and construction
- Architect: William L. Pereira & Associates
- Structural engineer: Brandow & Johnston
- Services engineer: Frumhoff & Cohen (electrical); J.L. Hengstler & Associates (mechanical)
- Main contractor: Nielsen Construction; Swinerton Builders

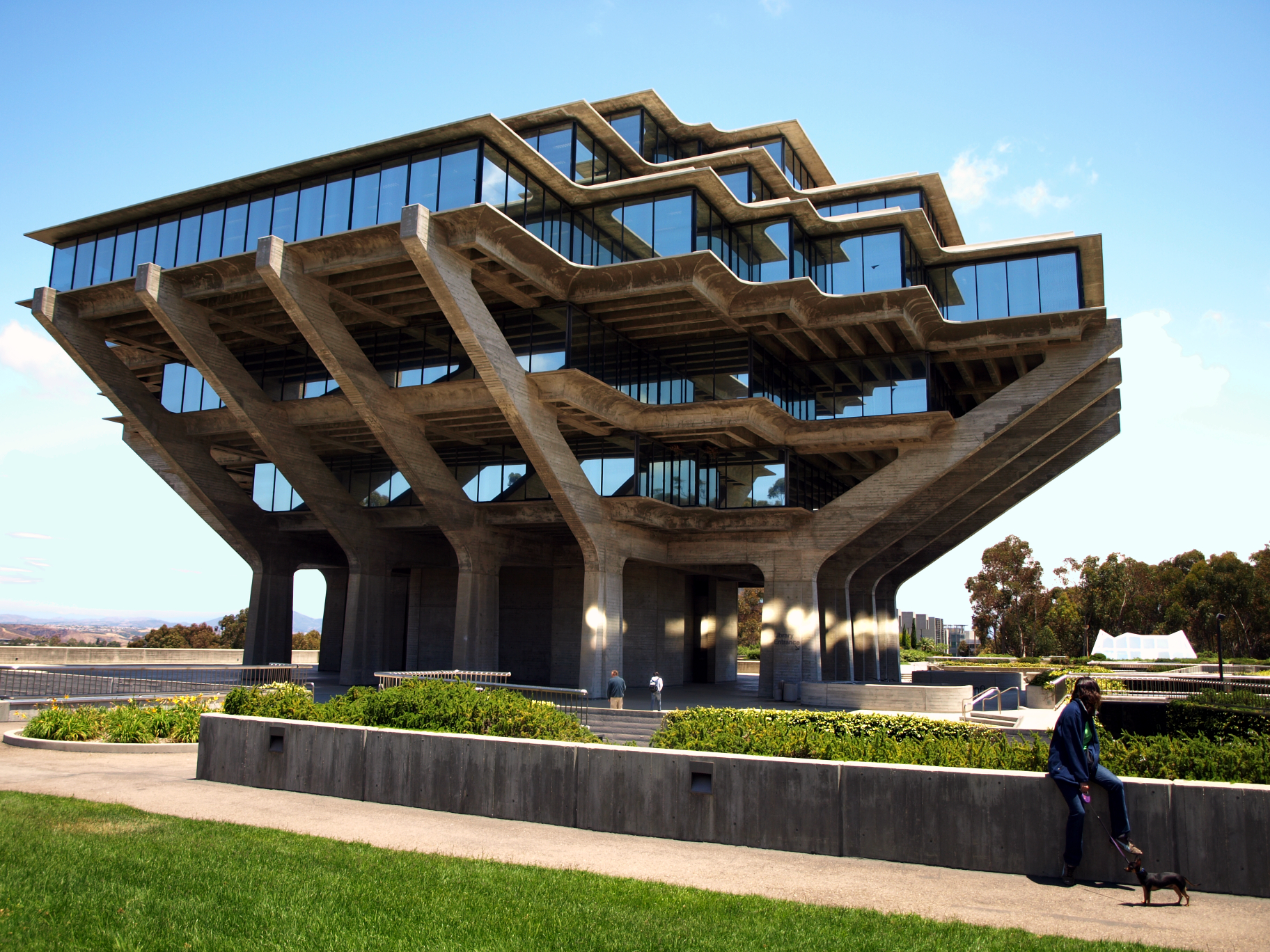
UC San Diego's distinctive Geisel Library, named for Theodor Seuss Geisel ("Dr. Seuss") and featured in UC San Diego's logo

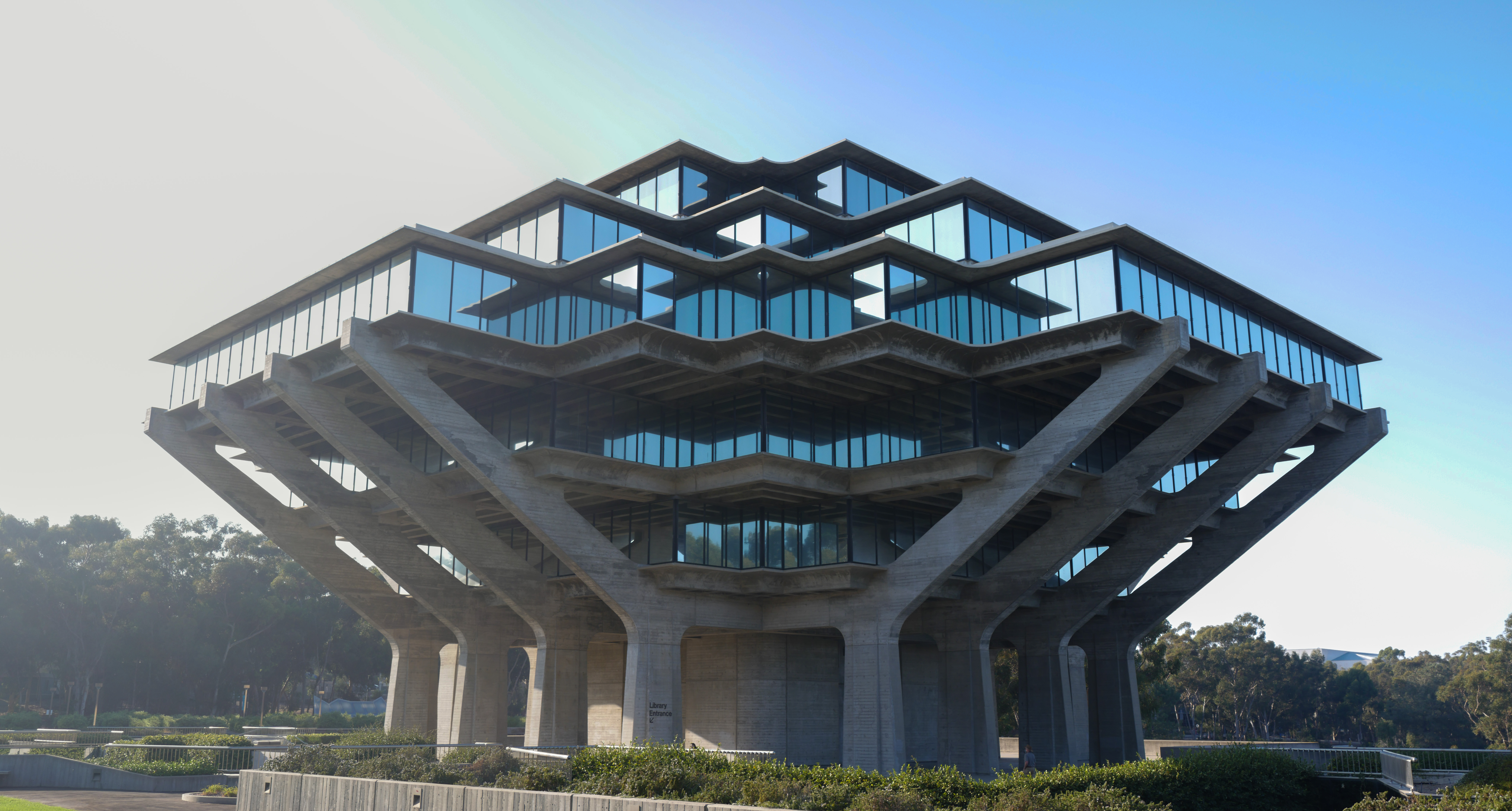
View of Geisel Library at daytime, seen from a path on the terrace level

Geisel Library is the main library building of the University of California, San Diego. It is named in honor of Audrey and Theodor Seuss Geisel, the latter of whom is better known as children's author Dr. Seuss. The building's distinctive architecture, described as occupying "a fascinating nexus between brutalism and futurism", has made it an iconic and widely recognized building on campus. The library is located in the center of the UC San Diego campus.

The library was designed by William Pereira and opened in 1970 as the Central Library. It was renovated in 1993 and rededicated as the University Library Building, and renamed Geisel Library in 1995. The UC San Diego Library consists of Geisel Library and the Sally T. WongAvery Library, with off-campus locations at Scripps Archives and Library Annex, the Trade Street Storage Annex, and the UC Southern Regional Library Facility. The head of the library system is designated the Audrey Geisel University Librarian, currently Erik T. Mitchell.

The library houses over seven million volumes to support the educational and research objectives of the university. It also contains the Mandeville Special Collections and Archives, which houses the Dr. Seuss Collection, which contains original drawings, sketches, proofs, notebooks, manuscript drafts, books, audio and videotapes, photographs, and memorabilia. The approximately 8,500 items in the collection document the full range of Dr. Seuss's creative achievements, beginning in 1919 with his high school activities and ending with his death in 1991.

== History ==
In 1958, Roger Revelle's efforts to establish an Institute of Science and Engineering adjacent to the Scripps Institution of Oceanography were motivated by his desire to immediately construct a science and library building on the present Revelle College site. When the university was eventually constructed, university librarian Melvin Voigt devised a plan to purchase books for the three new UC campuses: UC San Diego, UC Santa Cruz, and UC Irvine. The first Science and Engineering Library in Urey Hall satisfied the science-focused school's needs.

However, as faculty recruits began to found social science and humanities departments, it became clear to Chancellor John Semple Galbraith that the time had come to establish the campus's main library collections. One of the conditions of Galbraith's acceptance of the UC San Diego chancellorship had been that UC San Diego would house one of the three great libraries of the UC system. To accomplish this end, he formed a committee which commissioned architect William L. Pereira to prepare a master plan for the University Center and its focal point, the Central Library. Pereira and his team, who were still retained as campus architects by UC Irvine, produced the plans and designs from their Urbanus Square facility in Irvine.

Pereira's plan called for the University Center to be moved north and east, along with the proposed library building. This resulted in a revision of the campus long-range development plan: the three "clusters" of four colleges each would be more compact, allowing for an auxiliary library in each cluster. The proposed building was designed around a spheroidal tower, to maximize the stacks area that could be accessed in a given time from the center. This tower was to be situated atop a main level containing the staff and public areas of the library.

The chosen site allowed for future expansions to step downwards into the canyon. Construction of the first of three increments began in July 1968; the two main floors were constructed first to form the base of the structure. This allowed for the placement of scaffolding to support construction of the tower. The Central University Library building's topping-out ceremony took place in December 1969 and its formal dedication was in March 1971.

Central Library, combined with the original Scripps Library, the Humanities-Library building (now Galbraith Hall) in Revelle College, and the Biomedical Library (built in 1969), was able to support and represent the growing university for years. In 1990, construction began on a two-story, 136,850 square foot subterranean expansion of the main level. The project included renovation of the existing facility to comply with safety standards and cost $38 million, provided by California's 1988 Proposition 78. The expansion, designed by Gunnar Birkerts, was completed in February 1993. In 1995, La Jolla resident Audrey Geisel donated $20 million to the UC San Diego Library, supplementing her 1991 donation of $2.3 million worth of her husband Theodor Seuss Geisel's original works. In exchange, the library was renamed Geisel Library.

Between the first and second renovations of Geisel Library, several other UC San Diego library facilities were also renovated or closed. The biomedical library received a $17 million, 43,454 square foot expansion in 2006. In 2011, the SIO library, the IR/PS library, the Hillcrest Medical Center library, and the Center for Library Instruction and Computing Services (CLICS) were closed and their collections consolidated into Geisel Library due systemwide budget cuts. In 2015, university officials announced that Geisel Library would begin to undergo its second renovation. This renovation includes construction of a café named Audrey's on the main level of the library.

Geisel Library's current name has come under increasing criticism over the last few years due to increasing awareness of Theodor Geisel's own expression of anti-Blackness, Orientalism, and other racially-charged beliefs through cartoons and other work that he produced throughout the majority of his career. Although Theodor Geisel did come to renounce his more racially offensive characterizations during an interview for his alma mater of Dartmouth College, there has been no official response by UC San Diego to students requesting a name change.

== Design ==
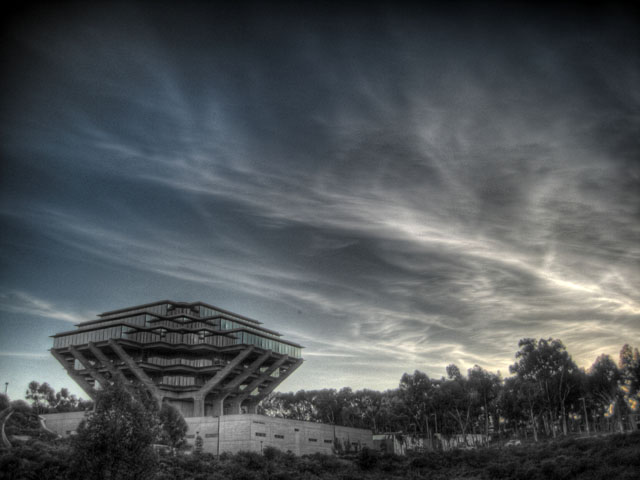
Geisel Library seen from the canyon

The distinctive original building was designed in the late 1960s by William Pereira to sit at the head of a canyon. The building's arches, in combination with the design of the individual floors, are intended to look like hands holding up a stack of books. William Pereira & Associates prepared a detailed report in 1969.

Pereira originally conceived of a mushroom-shaped, steel-framed building, but the projected construction and maintenance costs forced him to switch to a reinforced concrete structure. This change of material presented an opportunity for a more sculptural design, as well as opening up interior spaces that would have been bisected by steel trusses. Prior to construction, a 1/2-scale model of one of the outer columns was built and subjected to various tests.

The five upper stories (comprising the tower) house collections, individual study space, and group study rooms. Within the two-story base are the other library sections as well as study spaces and computer labs. The building has been described by Architecture Daily as occupying "a fascinating nexus between brutalism and futurism". Its tower rises 8 stories to a height of 110 ft (33.5 m).

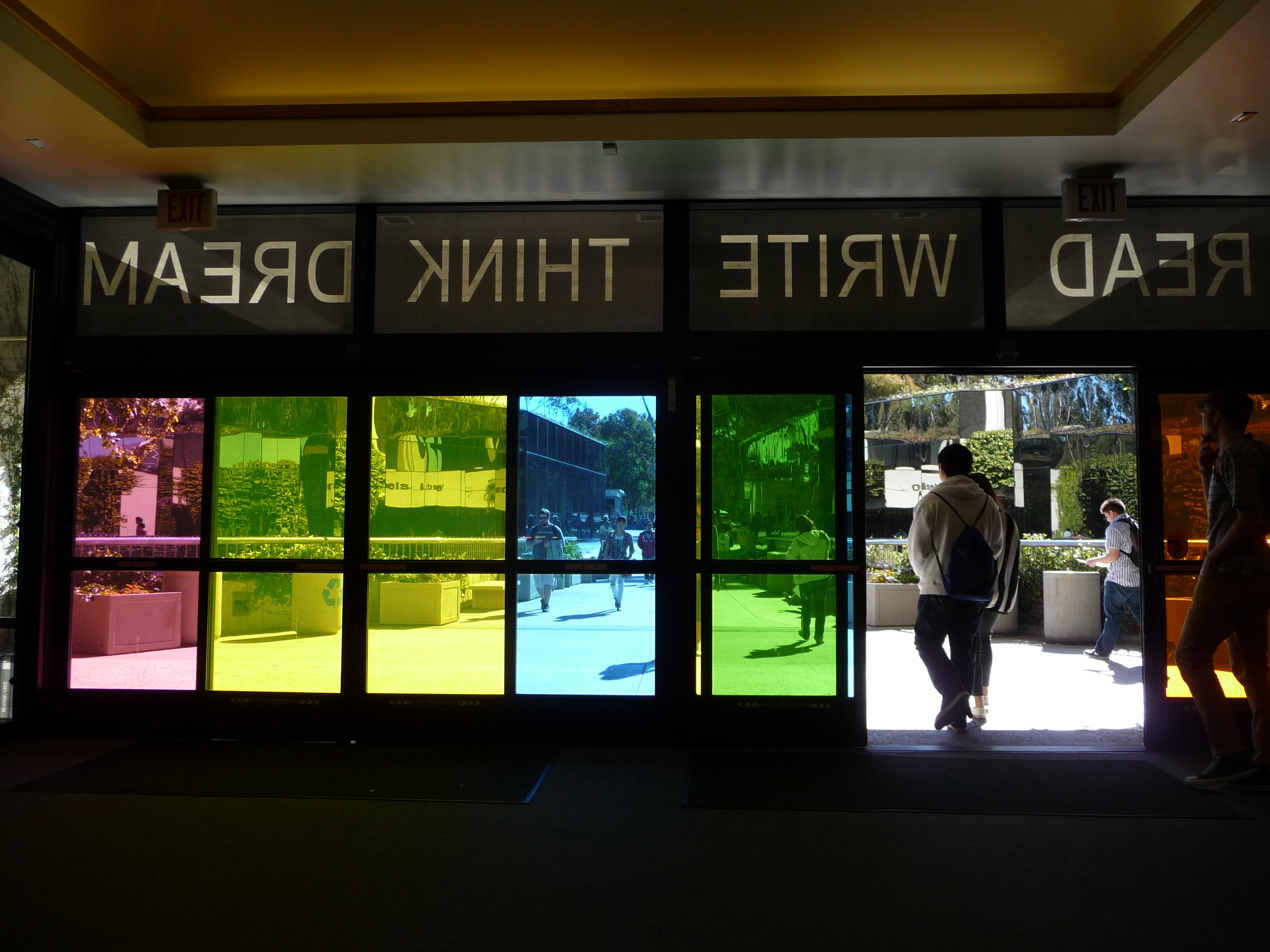
READ / WRITE / THINK / DREAM seen from the library interior

=== Expansion ===
Within a few years of the library’s opening, it was considered too small. Student enrollment had more than doubled, library staff numbers had increased, and the collections had grown so quickly that more than 300,000 volumes had to be stored off-site.

It was envisioned that future additions to the original building would form terraced levels around the tower base descending into the canyon, with the first of these planned for completion in 1976. The expansion project was ultimately funded in 1990, at which point the original plan had been discarded in favor of a subterranean addition onto the front of the library, designed by architect Gunnar Birkerts. In keeping with the original master plan, the addition was "deliberately designed to be subordinated to the strong, geometrical form of the existing library".

During planning in 1968, Pereira was approached to design an annex which would house the Samuel I. Barchas Science Library, a collection of rare historic science books that was planned to be donated to UCSD. The proposed building would have been a two-story structure seated to the front right of the main library, with its upper floor being a half-scale version of the tower's center floor. The building was rejected for being too small, and the Barchas collection now resides at Stanford University.

The library entrance is marked by John Baldessari's READ/WRITE/THINK/DREAM, an artwork which is part of the Stuart Collection. Geisel Library also features a life-size bronze statue of its namesake and his most famous character, The Cat in the Hat, on the forum level.

=== Snake Path ===
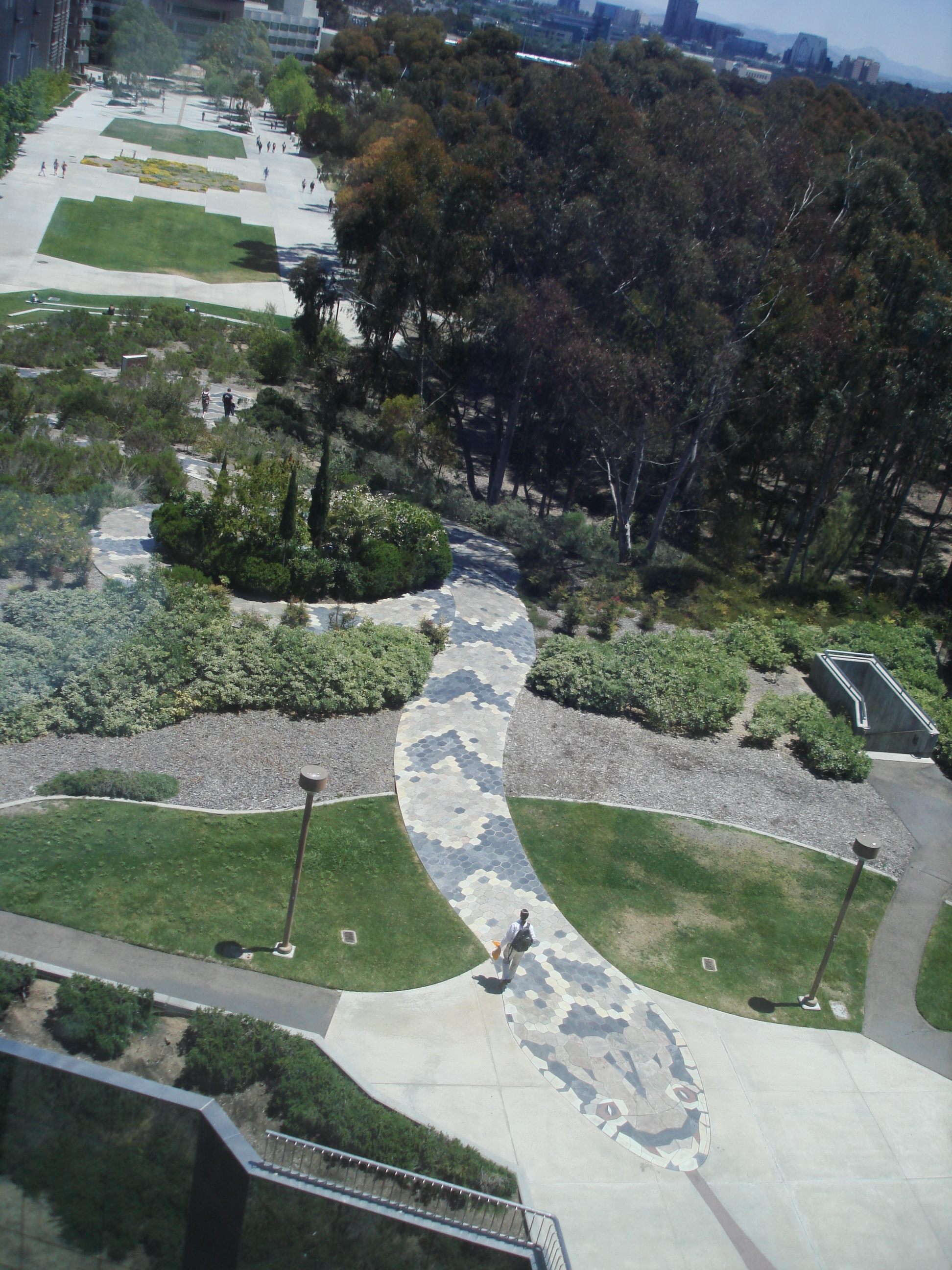
Snake Path as seen from Geisel

The east side of the Geisel forum is literally and symbolically connected to Warren Mall by the Stuart Collection work Snake Path, Alexis Smith's 560-foot-long slate tile path that winds towards the library. Its route passes a giant granite Paradise Lost and a small garden of fruit trees. The granite book is engraved with the excerpt "Then Wilt Thou Not Be Loth To Leave This Paradis But Shall Possess A Paradise Within Thee, Happier Far."

=== Third floor ===
One unusual feature of the library is that the lower levels are numbered 1 and 2, and the upper floors numbered 4 to 8. That has given rise to several fanciful explanations for why the third floor is apparently sealed off and not accessible from elevators or steps.

One of the more popular stories is that the building's design had not taken into account the eventual weight of books in the library, so the third floor has of necessity been left empty, a common urban legend associated at different times with many other university libraries.

In reality, the "missing" third floor is actually the open/outside forum. There is no other third floor, blocked off or otherwise. It is simply reinforced concrete and an emergency exit that helps students from the 4-8 floors get out without having to go to the second floor. The "third floor" is actually two separate levels. The third floor landings in the public stairwells open to the concrete platform outside the library, which was originally intended to be used for sculpture displays, acoustic music, impromptu outdoor conversations, an open public meeting area and poetry readings.

Potential theft of library materials and the risks attributed to the potential theft of UC San Diego's rare private collections of literature and art caused the doors to the third floor to be protected, to be used only in emergencies or by building personnel to conduct the transfer of equipment to the central core directly to avoid disrupting library operations. The "second" third floor's landing is numbered as floor "3.5" and consists of utility connections and wiring to the upper levels. There are no accessways beyond the stairwell doors of floor 3.5; they are locked utility rooms, essentially for maintenance and repair.

The doors to the 3rd floor open outwards from the stairwells, and the 3.5 floor doors open inwards towards the central core. The Central Forum, the 3rd floor, was originally intended to be a formal area of the library but outside the interior to avoid disturbing library patrons or library operations.

== Collections ==
The UC San Diego Library provides access to over 7 million digital and print works. Most of its works are organized into collections by subject, but the library also maintains some special collections and collections of distinction. The Mandeville Special Collections and Archives include:

- American Institute of Wine & Food Culinary Collection
- Archive for New Poetry
- Baja California Collection
- California, San Diego, & the History of the West
- Don Cameron Allen Renaissance Collection
- Dr. Seuss Collection: The Dr. Seuss Collection comprises the work of Theodor Seuss Geisel, otherwise known as Dr. Seuss. The collection contains roughly 8,500 items which include: "original drawings, sketches, proofs, notebooks, manuscript drafts, books, audio- and videotapes, photographs, and memorabilia". The Dr. Seuss collection is considered too fragile to be easily accessible. The collection is only open to researchers who have received permission from the director of special collections.
- East Asia Collection
- Hill Collection of Pacific Voyages: The Hill Collection of Pacific Voyages was donated to the University of California, San Diego in 1974 by Kenneth E. and Dorothy V. Hill. The collection is considered to be one of the finest for early voyages and discovery in the Pacific. It contains more than 2,000 items that date from the 16th to the mid-19th century. Some of the more interesting items include ship logs from whaling expeditions and records from botanists who made sea voyages.
- The San Diego Technology Archive
- Scripps Institution of Oceanography Collections
- Southworth Spanish Civil War Collection
- Tuzin Archive for Melanesian Anthropology
- Twentieth-Century Science & Public Policy
- UC San Diego Archives

== Other library buildings ==
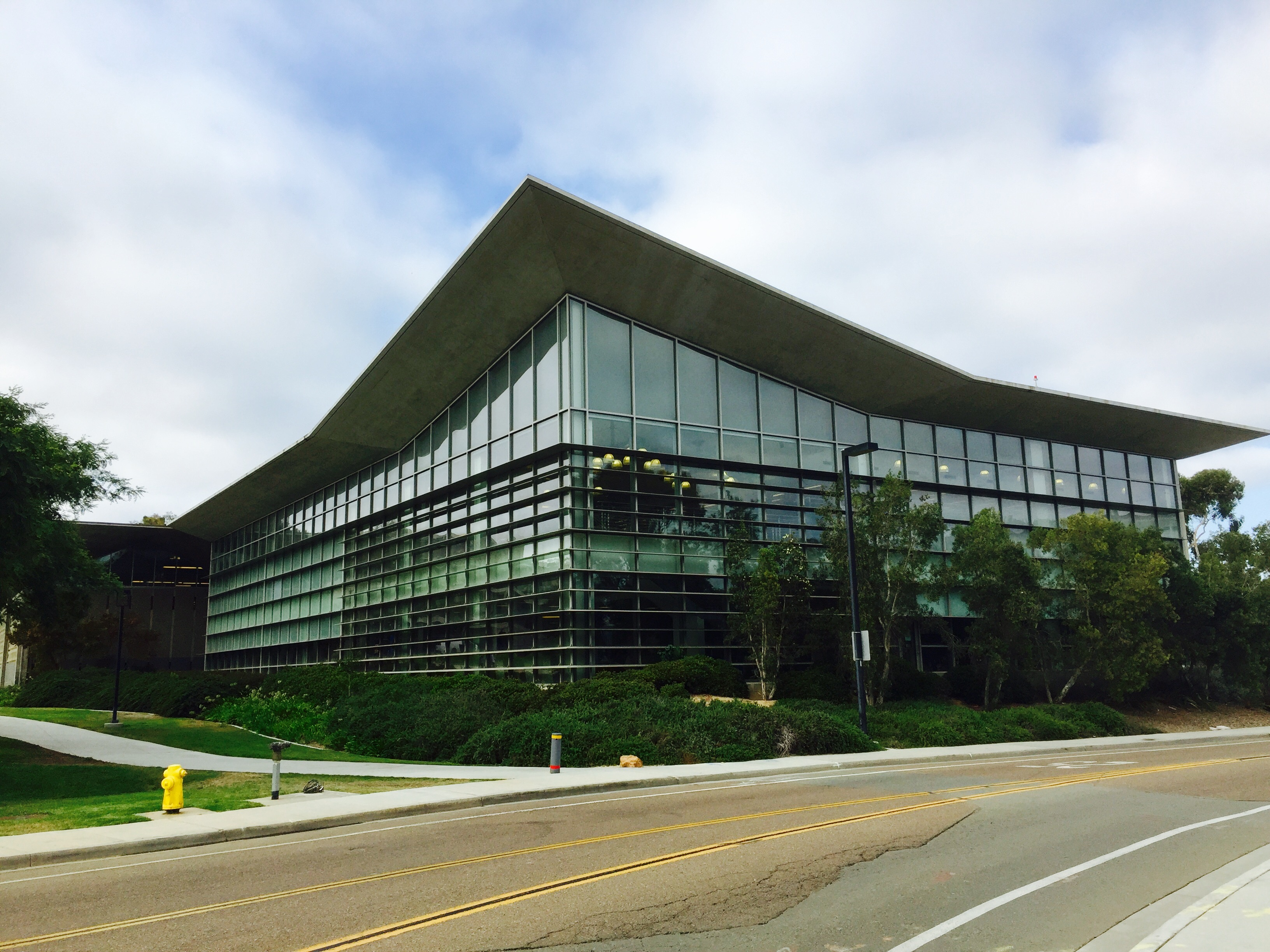
The southwest corner of the WongAvery Library

The 2011 consolidation of the UC San Diego Library resulted in Geisel Library and Sally T. WongAvery Library in the School of Medicine becoming the only remaining library buildings on campus. Additional library materials are located at the Trade Street Storage Annex on Miramar Road and the UC Southern Regional Library Facility at UCLA.

== In popular culture ==
- The TV series Mission: Impossible featured the library in the last episode filmed ("The Pendulum") as the "World Resources Ltd." headquarters. (aired 2/23/73)
- The TV series Simon & Simon (1981-1989) featured the library in its opening credits.
- The library exterior was featured in the 1984 cult horror film Night Train to Terror used for Richard Moll's character's business office. The film's screenwriter Philip Yordan was also a professor at UCSD at the time of filming.
- Geisel Library made an appearance as the exterior of a research lab in the 1991 Killer Tomatoes Strike Back, the third movie in the cult film series Attack of the Killer Tomatoes.
- The 2004 film Funky Monkey features several scenes filmed in and on the grounds of the library.
- The 2006 science fiction novel Rainbows End includes a major subplot focusing on the library.
- Opening sequence of Veronica Mars episode from 11/29/06, filmed at the Warren Mall of UC San Diego and featuring shots of various landmarks, including Geisel Library.
- Used in the 2008 film The Proud American (shooting date 2/17/08)
- The library was referenced by Ted Mosby in the 2009 How I Met Your Mother episode "Mosbius Designs"
- The 2010 film Inception has a snow fortress that is very similar in structure to Geisel.
- The 2010 film Kaboom features a shot of the library.
- In 2012 the television program Adult Swim created a remake of the Simon & Simon shot featuring the library, starring Jon Hamm, Adam Scott and Jeff Probst.
- Featured on the album cover of Circle's 2017 album Terminal
- In 2020 Alan Walker released his single Time, a remix of Hans Zimmer's Time from the movie Inception. The library was featured on the cover. It has slight variations as it is black with red lights illuminating its outline, and a big Red Nexus logo in the center.
- In 2020 Donald Liang and Terry Feng released their album Library of Dreams, a lofi album sonically recreating the 8 floors of the library. The library is featured on the cover.
- Referred to as the "Chatky Headquarters in Kyoto" in a 2021 Kohler commercial.
- In 2022, Totally Enormous Extinct Dinosaurs released his single Never Seen You Dance, whose accompanying music video is filmed in and outside the library.
- In 2024, American rapper Yeat featured a dystopian depiction of the library in his music video for "Breathe."
