= Emotions in the History of Witchcraft =

2017 book

- First edition
- Author: Laura Kounine, Michael Ostling
- Publisher: Palgrave Macmillan
- Publication date: 2017

Emotions in the History of Witchcraft is a 2017 book edited by historians Laura Kounine and Michael Ostling, published by Palgrave Macmillan. The book received scholarly reviews in Preternature, Zeitschrift für Historische Forschung, Renaissance Quarterly, and Comparative Studies in Society and History.
