= Galbraith Hall =

Building at the University of California, San Diego

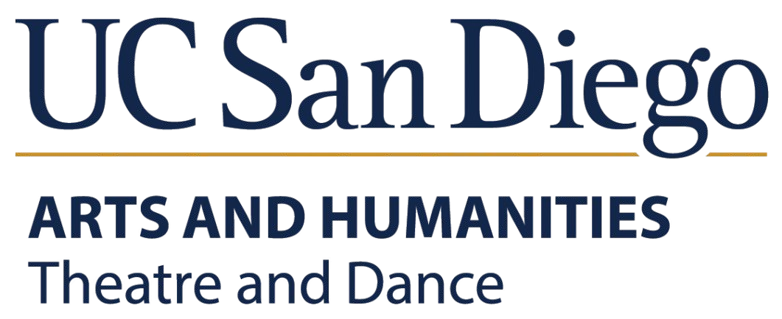

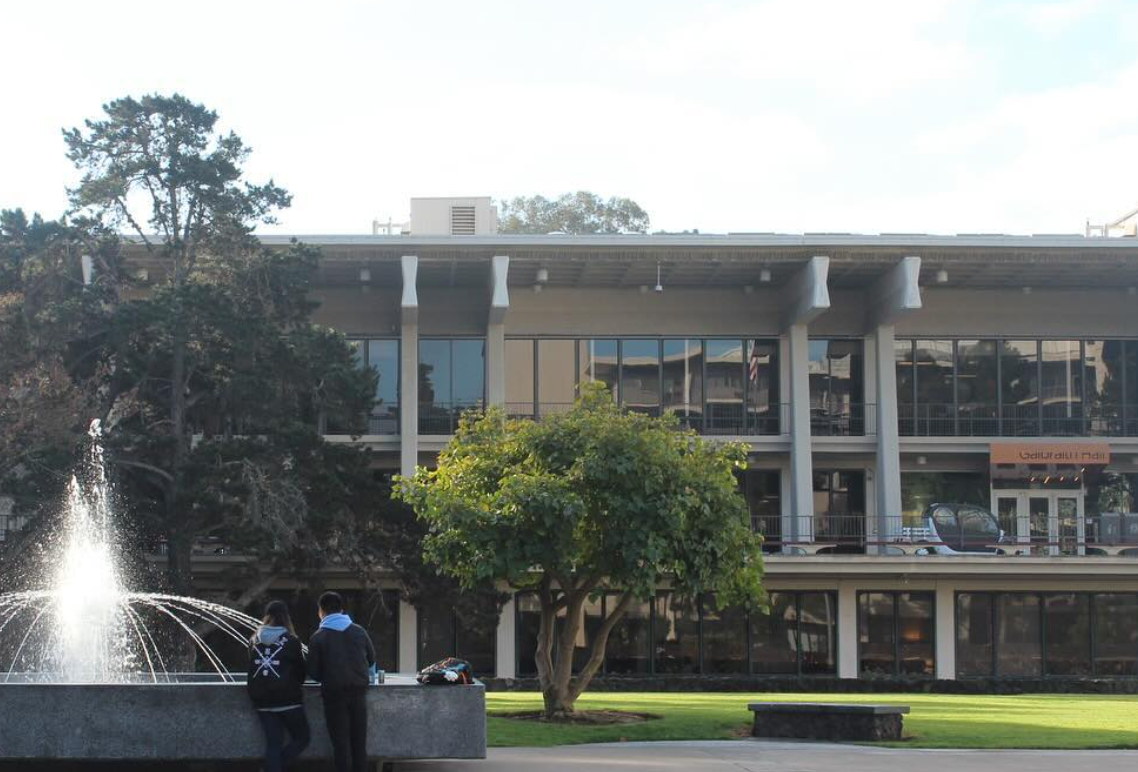
- Galbraith Hall with Revelle Fountain in the foreground, taken from Revelle Plaza
- Interactive map of the Galbraith Hall area
- Former names: Building E; Undergraduate Library; Humanities Library

General information
- Location: Revelle College; University of California, San Diego, La Jolla, California, United States
- Coordinates: 32.874°N 117.240932°W
- Opened: September 1965
- Owner: University of California, San Diego

Design and construction
- Architecture firm: Deems Lewis Martin

Galbraith Hall is a multipurpose academic building located in Revelle College at the University of California, San Diego. Opened in 1965, it is one of the oldest buildings at UC San Diego. Galbraith Hall is currently the center of operations for UC San Diego's Department of Theatre and Dance. Since the 1980s, it has been named after the second chancellor of UC San Diego, John Semple Galbraith.

== Facilities ==
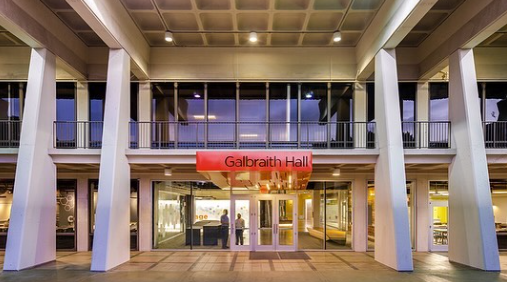
Entrance of Galbraith Hall

Galbraith Hall contains the main office of the Department of Theatre and Dance, along with faculty and graduate student offices, four rehearsal rooms, the 99 seat Arthur Wagner Theatre, dressing rooms, a stage management booth, and labs for student designers. The building also contains a large 417 seat lecture hall and several student study spaces, and is home to the main office of the university's Counseling and Psychological Services. Revelle College Administration is also located in Galbraith Hall.

To the south of Galbraith Hall is the La Jolla Project, often dubbed as Stonehenge, an art piece part of the Stuart Collection at UC San Diego, and to the north of Galbraith Hall is Revelle Plaza.

== Awards ==
Galbraith Hall received an Orchid Award for Interior Design in 2013, an honor given by the San Diego Architectural Foundation.

== History ==
Originally, Galbraith Hall was established as a library at UC San Diego. It was designed by the firm Deems Lewis Martin and cost over $3 million. At the time it was called Building E. It was one of the original buildings of Revelle College, the first college at UC San Diego. At some points, the building has also been dubbed the Undergraduate Library and the Humanities Library. The basement auditorium was used for musical performances. The building's architectural style is considered to be brutalist, like many other early buildings at UC San Diego (consider Geisel Library, for example).

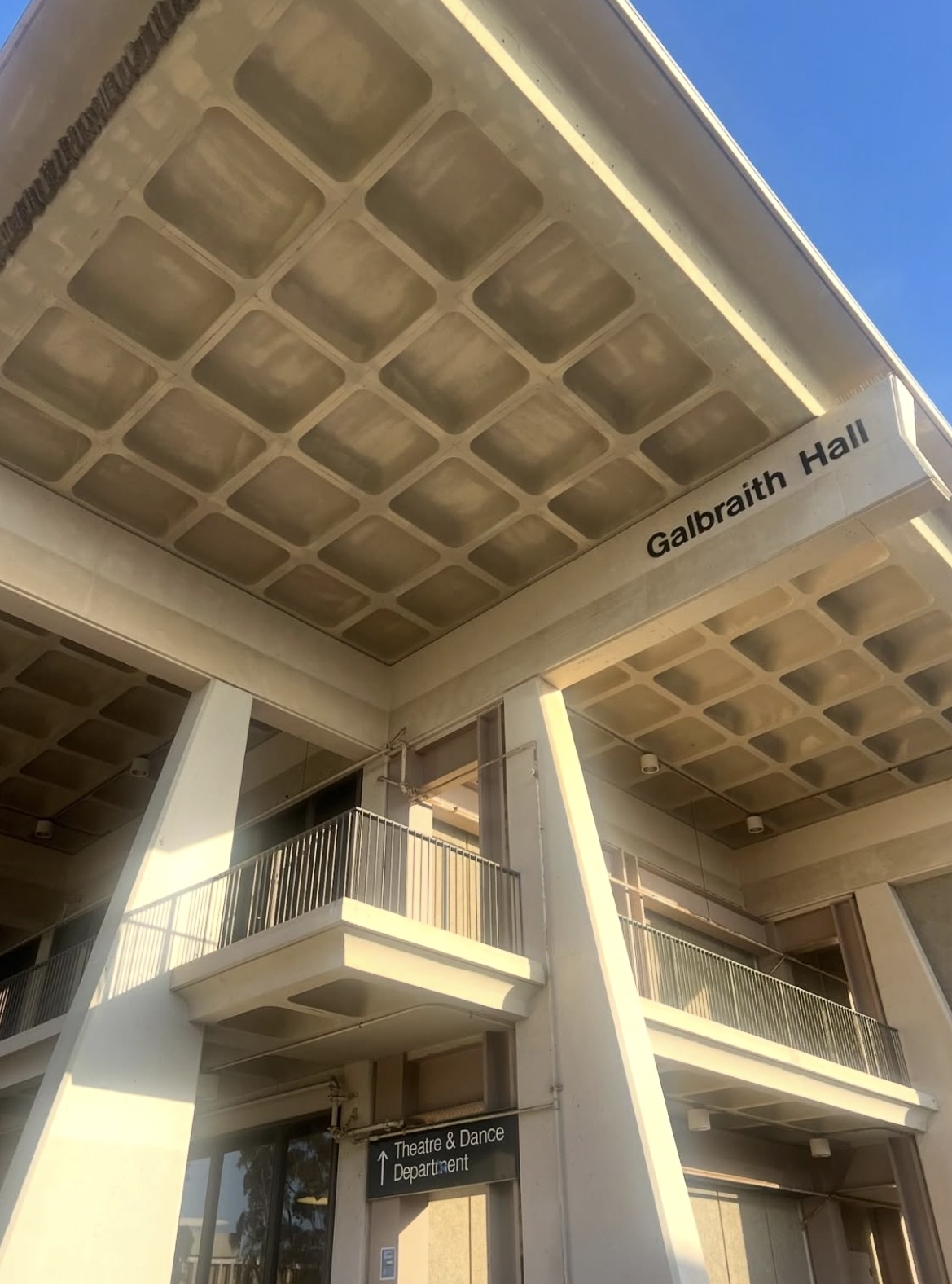
Galbraith Hall's iconic roof design

In 1970, the new Central Library (now Geisel Library) was constructed. Over time, Geisel Library became the main library on campus, but Galbraith Hall still hosted the Center for Library and Instructional Computing Services (CLICS), which served as a library study hall. It became integral as it was one of the few 24-hour study facilities on campus during finals week.

In 1970, George Winnie Jr. set himself on fire in Revelle Plaza, in front of Galbraith Hall, in protest of the Vietnam War.

In the 1980s, the building was renamed in honor of former chancellor John Semple Galbraith.

In 1985, anti-apartheid protestors at UC San Diego set up an encampment at Revelle Plaza for over a month and occupied Galbraith Hall to protest the university's relationship with South Africa. Protests also occurred at other UC campuses like UC Berkeley. The UC Regents ended up voting to divest $3.1 billion from South Africa.

=== 2011 Student Break-In and Occupation ===
In 2011, CLICS was closed by the university. Many other libraries at UC San Diego were also shut down during this period, including the Medical Center Library and the International Relations and Pacific Studies Library. This was due to a $3 million budget cut to the university library system. Students began to complain over lack of 24-hour study space.

Students protested and gathered in front of Galbraith Hall on December 5, 2011, with some camping outside with blankets and study materials. Police blocked the entrance of the building but eventually they were sent away and students forced the doors of the library open around noon. UC San Diego claims that they were on the way to open the doors as the students were doing so. Students claimed the building as a student-run space with its own student-made rules in a "reclamation" movement. UC San Diego administrators met with students for the rest of the day. It was agreed that the university would not force the students out of Galbraith Hall, and the students would be allowed to occupy the building for a week. During the student occupation, Galbraith Hall was subject to vandalism.

The university opened Geisel Library for 24/7 studying and made extra room for students as an attempt to satisfy students.

=== Renovations ===
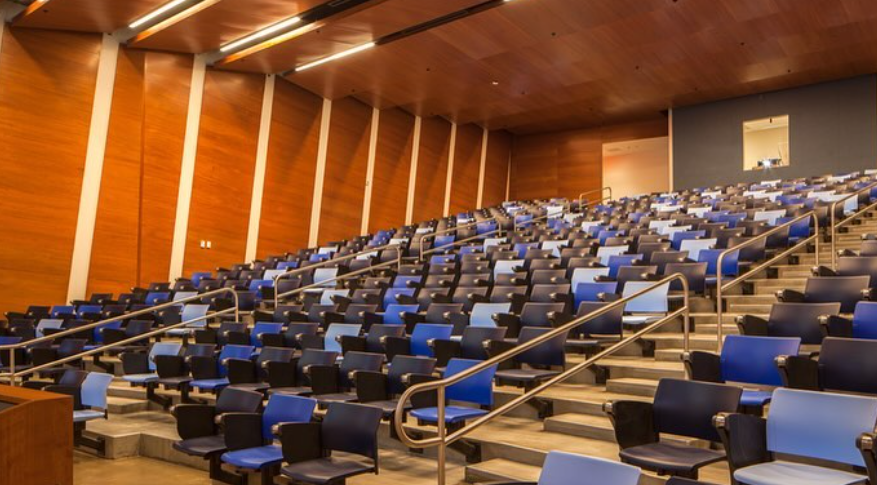
Lecture hall in Galbraith Hall (GH 242)

Months of renovations were planned, a task given to the firm Kevin deFreitas Architects. The building and library were repurposed into a new lecture hall, several new student study spaces, and new facilities for the Department of Theatre and Dance. In order to fit the lecture hall inside, remodeling was done to the building's structure. The new lecture hall held seats for 417 students, had a demonstration bench and sink for chemistry, and two 90-inch flat panel displays with a 17 foot screen. Since there were so few large lecture halls on campus at the time, the university administration believed that building a new one would help make scheduling easier. Meeting the demands made by students, the new study areas would be open 24/7 during the last couple weeks of each term. Vandalism and graffiti from the student takeover was removed. Some students in the CLICS reclamation movement were unhappy with these renovations, as they wanted more open access public spaces. The renovations were completed in 2013 and cost around $7 million. The renovation received a LEED-gold certification.

In 2018, an art piece outside Galbraith Hall known as the Big Red Chair was removed by the Department of Theatre and Dance. Big Red Chair was a popular attraction for people to take photos, but because of damage it had sustained and the increasing cost of maintaining it, the university decided to remove it. Big Red Chair was created in 2007 for a theatre production, but was the department decided to place the artwork outside of Galbraith Hall after the production.
