= Elizabeth Davis =

Betty, Bette, Bettye, Bettey, Eliza or Elizabeth Davis may refer to:

== Performers ==
- Bette Davis (1908–1989), American actress
- Betty Davis (1944–2022), American funk, rock and soul singer
- Elizabeth Davis (bassist) (born 1965), American songwriter and musician
- Elizabeth A. Davis (born 1980), American actress and musician

== Writers ==
- Eliza Davis (1866–1931), English fashion writer and gossip columnist known as "Mrs Aria"
- Eliza Davis (letter writer), Jewish English woman notable for her correspondence with the novelist Charles Dickens
- Eliza Van Benthuysen Davis (1811–1863), American letter writer and wife of Joseph Emory Davis
- Elizabeth Lindsay Davis (1885–1944), African-American teacher and activist
- Elizabeth Gould Davis (1910–1974), American librarian and feminist writer
- Elizabeth Davis (midwife), American author and women's health care specialist since 1977
- Elizabeth Davis (TV writer), American producer during 2010s, a/k/a Elizabeth Davis Beall

== Others ==
- Elizabeth Davis (Mormon) (1791–1876), American Latter-Day Saint and wife of Joseph Smith
- Elizabeth Peke Davis (1803–1860), Hawaiian high chiefess, a/k/a Betty Davis
- Betty Davis (film editor), American film editor during 1920s
- Bettye Davis (1938–2018), American politician, social worker, and nurse
- "Bette Davis Eyes", 1974 song by Donna Weiss and Jackie DeShannon
- Elizabeth Van Wie Davis, American academic specializing in international affairs
- Elizabeth Davis (science educator), American academic specializing in science education
- Eliza Jeffries Davis (1875–1943), English historian

== See also ==
- Elizabeth Davies (disambiguation)
- Lisa Davis (disambiguation)
