= John Semple Galbraith =

American historian

John Semple Galbraith (November 10, 1916 – June 10, 2003) was a British Empire historian concentrating on Canada (The Hudson's Bay Company) and South and East Africa. He served as chancellor of the University of California, San Diego from 1964 to 1968.

He was a native of Glasgow; his family emigrated to the United States in 1926. He received a BA from Miami University in Ohio in 1938, and Ph.D. in 1943 at the University of Iowa, working under his dissertation adviser, C. W. de Kiewiet. He served as an Army historical officer for the Third Air Force until 1946, and assumed a professorship at UCLA in 1948.

He was the second chancellor of the relatively new University of California San Diego. As a condition of accepting the chancellorship in 1964, he secured a promise from University of California president Clark Kerr that a library would be built and that UCSD would receive full standing as an autonomous university of the system. Geisel Library is considered his legacy at UCSD. Galbraith Hall at UCSD is named after him.

Galbraith's published work includes: Mackinnon and East Africa 1878–1895: A Study in the 'New Imperialism', Cambridge Commonwealth Series (Nov 22, 1972); The little emperor: Governor Simpson of the Hudson's Bay company (1976); The Hudson's Bay Company as an imperial factor, 1821–1869 (1957); Crown and Charter: The Early Years of the British South Africa Company, Perspectives on Southern Africa (Aug 1975); Reluctant Empire: British Policy on the South African Frontier, 1834–1854 (Jun 1963).

He left the campus for a visiting fellowship at Cambridge in 1968, and subsequently resumed teaching at UCLA.

== Works ==
=== Books ===
- Galbraith, John S. (1951). The Establishment of Canadian Diplomatic Status at Washington. Berkley: University of California Press.
- — (1957). The Hudson's Bay Company as an imperial factor, 1821-1869. Toronto: University of Toronto Press. OCLC 1149440105.
  - — (2022) [1957]. The Hudson's Bay Company as an Imperial Factor, 1821-1869. University of California Press. ISBN 978-0-520-32271-4.
- — (1963). Reluctant Empire: British Policy on the South African Frontier, 1834–1854. Berkley: University of California Press.
- — (1972). Mackinnon and East Africa 1878-1895: a study in the 'New Imperialism'. Cambridge: Cambridge University Press. ISBN 0-521-08344-3.
- — (1974). Crown and charter : the early years of the British South Africa Company. Berkley: University of California Press. ISBN 0-520-02693-4.
- — (1976). The Little Emperor: Governor Simpson of the Hudson's Bay Company. Toronto: Macmillan of Canada. ISBN 9780770513894.

=== Articles ===
- — (June 1952). "The Pamphlet Campaign on the Boer War". The Journal of Modern History. 24 (2): 111–126. doi:10.1086/237496.
- — (January 1960). "The "Turbulent Frontier" as a Factor in British Expansion". Comparative Studies in Society and History. 2 (2): 150–168. doi:10.1017/S0010417500000645.
- — (October 1961). "Myths of the "Little England" Era". The American Historical Review. 67 (1): 34–48. doi:10.2307/1846260. JSTOR 1846260.
- — (May 1965). "The Chartering of the British North Borneo Company". Journal of British Studies. 4 (2): 102–126. doi:10.1086/385502.
- — (November 1970). "The British South Africa Company and the Jameson Raid". Journal of British Studies. 10 (1): 145–161. doi:10.1086/385604.
- —; al-Sayyid-Marsot, Afaf Lutfi (November 1978). "The British Occupation of Egypt: Another View". International Journal of Middle East Studies. 9 (4): 471–477. doi:10.1017/S0020743800030658.
- — (1984). "No Man's Child: The Campaign in Mesopotamia, 1914–1916". The International History Review. 6 (3): 358–385. doi:10.1080/07075332.1984.9640348.

Academic offices
Preceded by Herbert York	Chancellor of the University of California San Diego; 1964-1968	Succeeded by William J. McGill
