= Self-immolation of George Winne Jr. =

American anti-Vietnam war activist (1947–1970)

George Winne Jr.
- A picture of George Winne Jr. aired in The San Diego Union Tribune on May 11, 1970, after his death.
- Born: April 2, 1947; Detroit, Michigan, U.S.
- Died: May 11, 1970 (aged 23); La Jolla, California, U.S.
- Cause of death: Burns from self-immolation
- Monuments: May 1970 Peace Memorial

George Winne Jr. (April 2, 1947 – May 11, 1970) was an American student who, in protest of the United States' involvement in the Vietnam War, set himself on fire in an act of self-immolation at Revelle Plaza on the campus of the University of California, San Diego. The incident took place less than a month after the American invasion of Cambodia and one week after the Kent State Massacre.

== Early life and education ==
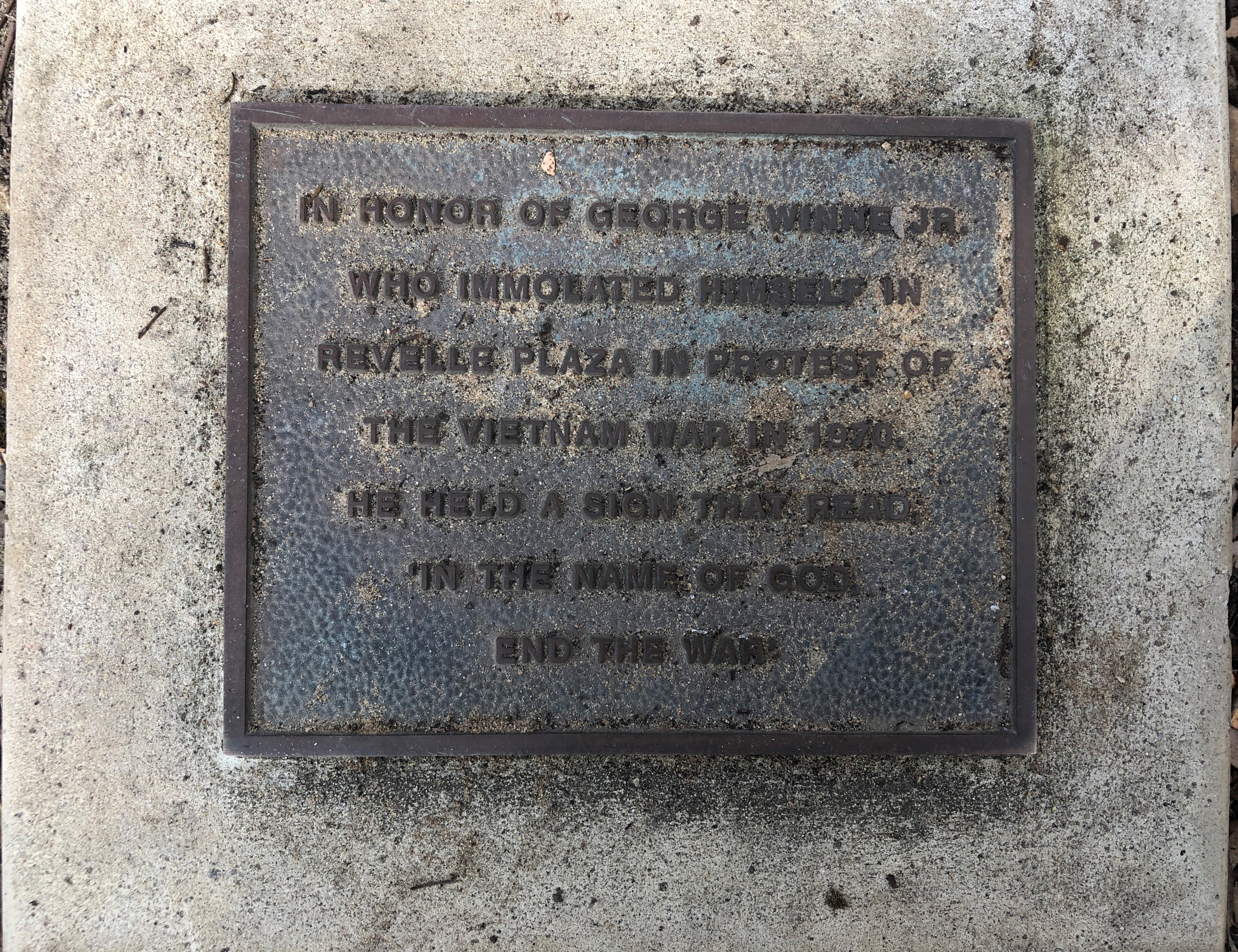
Plaque in honor of Winne at the "Memorial Grove" at UCSD

George Morris Winne Jr. was born April 2, 1947 in Detroit, Michigan while his father, George Morris Winne Sr., was a Captain in the U.S. Navy. His mother, Emily Richter Winne, was previously a stenographer from Pasadena, California. After his sister Katherine Burgess Winne (1950-1982) was born in Norfolk, Virginia, the family moved to La Jolla, California. George Morris Winne Sr. retired in June, 1962. Their military household was reportedly "not too strict."

In 1962, Winne Jr. was pictured in a La Jolla High School yearbook as a member of the junior Cadet Corps with the rank of Corporal. The family moved to Medford, Oregon when Winne Jr.'s paternal grandmother, who had lived in Oregon, died in 1963.

On October 6, 1963, Winne Jr. was interviewed by the Medford Mail Tribune after attending an anti-communist rally held by the Freedom Center with speaker Kenneth Goff. Having asked Goff if his American Problems textbook was "one of the 90 [anti-capitalist] books" used in schools, Winne Jr. was reportedly told to "shut up" or else he would be forced to leave. Winne Jr. and three other students left the event early due to this. He told the Medford Mail Tribune: "[The Freedom Center] and Goff seem to have a great fear of viewpoints other than their own... I don't understand people who go to such meetings." Winne Jr. graduated from Medford High School in 1964. He was rejected from the US Naval Academy due to poor eyesight, but was an ROTC candidate at Colorado School of Mines where he majored in Organic Chemistry for a year. The following year, after his family moved back to California, he transferred to UCSD, only about twenty minutes from La Jolla. He switched his major to History at Muir College. During his junior year at UCSD, he expressed interest in specializing in Ancient History in graduate school, enrolling in Latin and Greek courses as a result. He was an attentive student. A friend of Winne Jr., Wayne Dick, said of him: "He was a really bright person [...] He thought deeply about things and came up with observations that were not trivial." There is no indication he was active in any student protest prior to his death in 1970. Dick raised doubts that Winne Jr. believed in "mass action protest," and Winne Jr.'s mother said she had never known him to be involved. Winne Jr. did reportedly become interested in Christian mysticism during his senior year at UCSD. He allegedly frequented a "self-realization" bookstore in La Jolla and became a vegetarian.

By 1970, Winne Jr. became depressed and withdrawn. According to Professor of History Roger A. DeLaix, Winne Jr. began to struggle with attendance and completing his assignments on time. In May, Winne Jr.'s mother stated that he had not visited home since Christmas. Winne Jr. reportedly had received a draft notice at some point that spring.

== Death ==
Slightly after 4 pm on Sunday, May 10, George Winne Jr. lit gasoline soaked rags on his body in Revelle Plaza on the UCSD campus and began running, carrying a sign reading "In God's name, End this war." While running through the plaza, he reportedly yelled, "kill me" multiple times. Graduate student Keith Stowe knocked him down and then attempted to smother the flames: "but it didn't help." Winne Jr. was still conscious at the hospital. He suffered third and fourth degree burns over 95 percent of his body, and he died at Scripps Hospital at 2 am on the 11th of May, 1970.

At noon on May 11, a memorial service was held in Revelle Plaza. Speakers included history professor and chair of the faculty senate Gabriel Jackson and philosophy professor Herbert Marcuse.

Winne Jr.'s dying wish was for his parents to send a letter to President Nixon about his protest urging him to withdraw from the war, which his mother did carry out. Her statement was printed in multiple newspapers around the country.

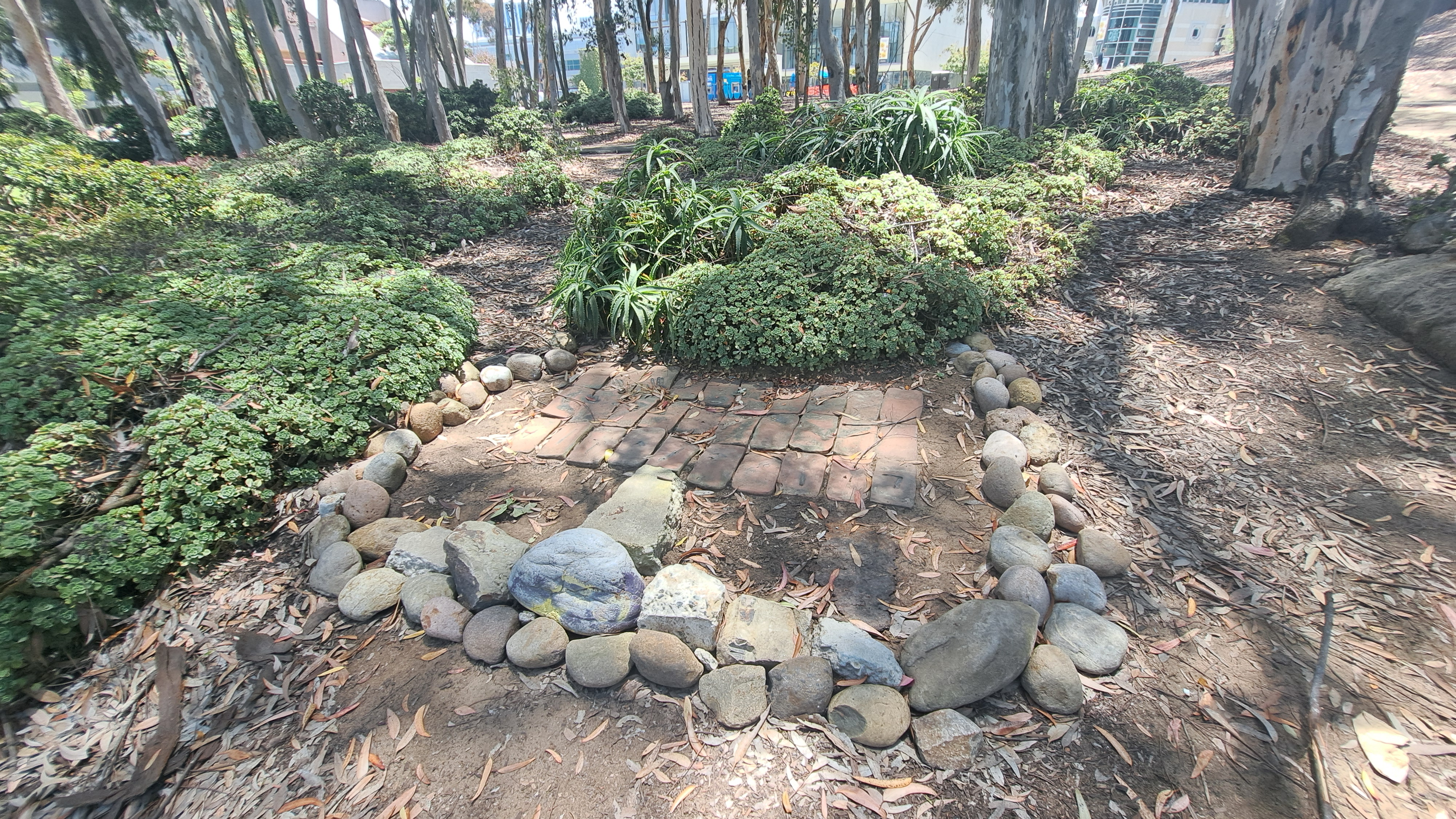
"Thirty Blocks" (1976) sculpture in "George Winne Memorial Grove"

== Memorials ==
For decades, faculty and students held vigils in remembrance of Winne Jr. in Revelle Plaza. There was debate among the community whether Winne Jr. should be memorialized in an official capacity, for fear of encouraging his actions. Former UCSD Chancellor William McGill believed that Winne Jr. was a "psychologically disturbed" individual acting partly due to intense peer-pressure and a climate of fear. The Revelle College Council voted in May 1981 whether to erect an official plaque, but the motion was not passed because the council "did not want to condone in any way what amounted to an act of violence."

In 1976, sculptor Virginia Maksymowicz installed a project called "Thirty Blocks" in what has become known according to campus folklore as the "George Winne Memorial Grove" to the east of Geisel Library and north of Price Center. While the clay was damp, the sculptor lay down on the bricks leaving an impression of her body and objects from her purse, which were then fired in a kiln to leave an "archaeological record" of her. A small plaque was also installed in 2000, which reads:

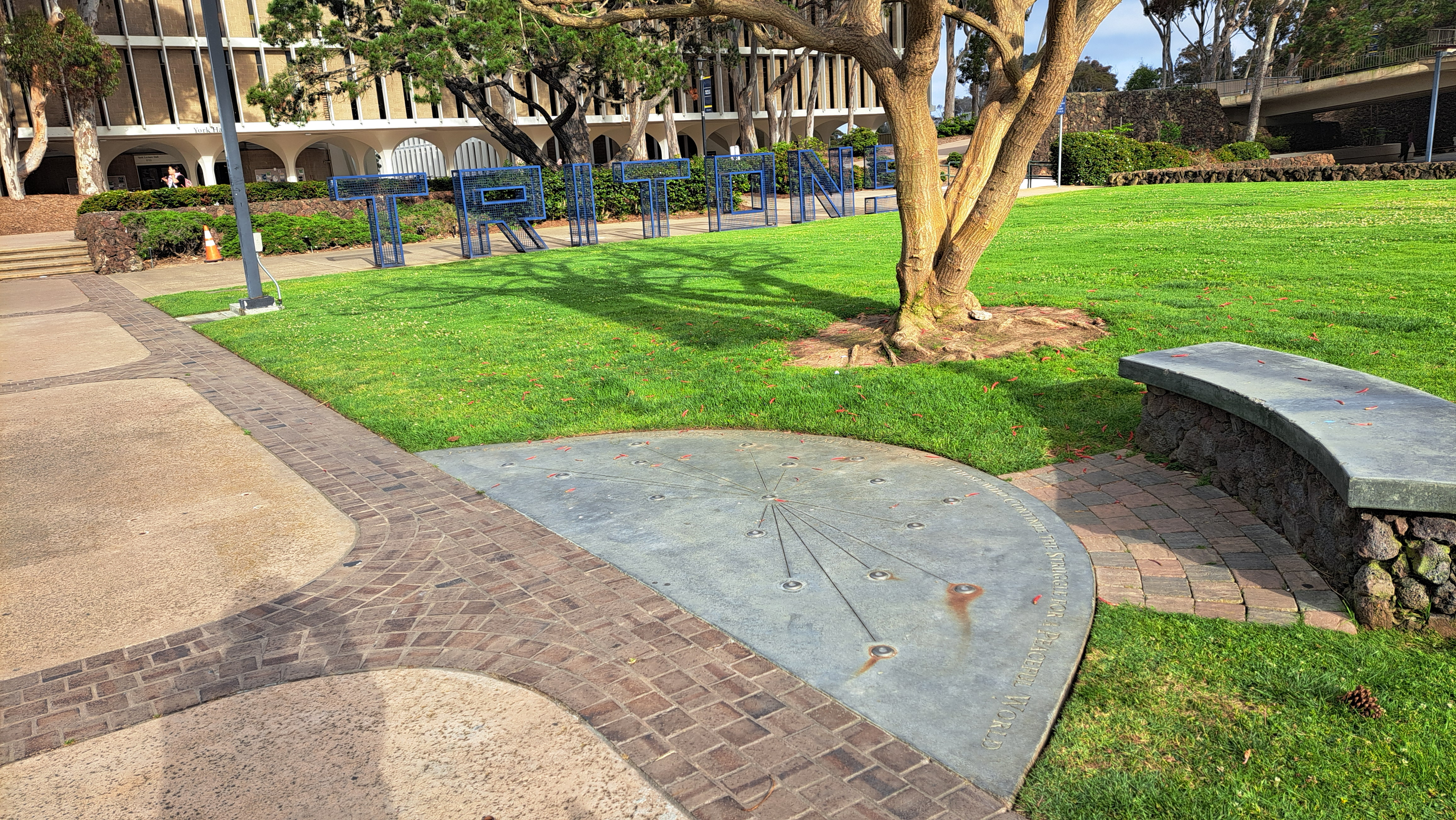
May 1970 Peace Memorial (2013) in Revelle Plaza

IN HONOR OF GEORGE WINNE JR.

WHO IMMOLATED HIMSELF IN

REVELLE PLAZA IN PROTEST OF

THE VIETNAM WAR IN 1970.

HE HELD A SIGN THAT READ

'IN THE NAME OF GOD,

END THE WAR'

In the winter of 2014, a "May 1970 Peace Memorial", was installed in Revelle Plaza. An inscription reads:

For George Winne, Jr., the student activists of May 1970, and all those who continue the struggle for a peaceful world.

== See also ==
- Self-immolations in protest to the Vietnam War
- List of political self-immolations
- Thích Quảng Đức, a Vietnamese monk who self-immolated in 1963 in response to the Buddhist Crisis.
