= Buffalo Ranch =

Tourist attraction in Newport Beach, California, USA

Coordinates: 33°37′46″N 117°51′45″W

Buffalo Ranch was a tourist attraction which was operated on 115 acres (0.47 km^{2}) in what is today Newport Beach, California by Gene Clark of the Irvine Company and the grandson of the famous Indian chief Geronimo. It was the first outside business to be allowed onto land owned by The Irvine Company. The ranch began with a herd of 72 buffalo, and this number quickly grew. Several Indian families from Kansas were invited to live in the area and work at the Ranch to add to its authenticity and present various tribal dances for the tourists. Bison Road, which exists today as a connection between Jamboree and MacArthur roads in Newport Beach, was originally created as an access road to Buffalo Ranch.

== As Urbanus Square ==
In late 1959/early 1960, Buffalo Ranch was shut down due to rising land costs. At the same time, a nearby site had been chosen for the University of California, Irvine campus, and the Irvine Company had hired the campus' architect, William Pereira, to plan the city of Irvine around it. Pereira, who considered himself a "barn freak" and enjoyed renovating them, took the vacant Buffalo Ranch barn and converted it into his on-site planning office. As the project grew, Pereira added additional buildings to the site, which he renamed "Urbanus Square." It was here that much of the cities of Irvine and Newport Beach were planned, as well as many of Pereira's projects outside the Los Angeles area (such as Geisel Library in San Diego).

== Later existence ==
Bonita Canyon, which lies within the land that had once been Buffalo Ranch, became somewhat notorious in the late 1960s as a hideout for hippies from the nearby university. Indeed, drug paraphernalia and evidence of sexual encounters were frequently found there by rock climbers who frequented the canyon, attracted mainly to a large rock formation that was known as the "Buffalo Chip."

Long after Pereira and his team departed, the barn stood on the street corner as a landmark to passersby. It was demolished in the 1990s to make way for the Bonita Canyon housing development. Today, a large bronze statue of a buffalo stands at the street corner with a plaque placed in front of it honoring the site's history.

Part of the barn, including the silo that Pereira had converted into a 360-degree survey platform for his planning efforts, was moved to Centennial Farm at the Orange County Fair & Exposition Center where it remains to this day.

The main section of this barn is still located in Newport Beach. It can be seen fully rebuilt at the corner of Irvine Avenue and Holiday Road.
