= Lisa Davis =

Lisa Davis may refer to:

- Lisa Davis (actress) (born 1936), English-born American actress
- Lisa Davis (businesswoman) (born 1963), American businesswoman, chair and CEO, Siemens Corp
- Lisa Davis (politician) (active since 2025), American politician
- Lisa Corinne Davis (active since 2000), American artist
- Lisa Davis, a character in 1980 American comedy Airplane!, played by Jill Whelan
- Lisa Fagin Davis (21st century), American medievalist, codicologist, and paleographer

== See also ==
- Elizabeth Davis (disambiguation)
- Lisa Davies (disambiguation)
