= Revelle College =

First college at UC San Diego

- UC San Diego
- Coordinates: 32.874742°N 117.241214°W
- Motto: Purpose, Truth, Vision
- Established: 1964 (First)
- Former names: First College
- Status: Undergraduate, liberal arts
- Colors: Revelle Blue, Gold
- Provost: Paul K. L. Yu
- Deans: Dean of Student Affairs Sherry L. Mallory Dean of Academic Advising Katie Michel Associate Dean of Student Affairs and Director of Residence Life Mary Tregoning
- Residents: 3,622 (16% of UCSD campus population)
- Undergraduates: 4,167
- Core course: Humanities (HUM)
- Newspaper: Revellations
- Major events: Festival Watermelon Drop Concert Revellution
- Website: Official website

Revelle College is the oldest residential college at the University of California, San Diego in La Jolla, California. Founded in 1964, it is named after oceanographer and UC San Diego founder Roger Revelle. UC San Diego—along with Revelle College—was founded at the height of the Space Race between the United States and the Soviet Union. As a result, the initial class of 181 undergraduates comprised only 30 non-science majors. Revelle College focuses on developing "a well-rounded student who is intellectually skilled and prepared for competition in a complex world."

Revelle's general education requirements are rigorously structured in the tradition of a classical liberal arts college. Revelle's stated goal of creating "Renaissance scholars" is reflected in these requirements, which ensure that a graduate has experience in humanities, calculus, physical science, biology, social science, a fine art, and a foreign language. Revelle College's core writing course, Humanities (HUM), is a challenging Western Civilization course that incorporates writing, history and other social science requirements into a five-quarter (1 2/3 year) sequence through which students examine the greater social and literary developments throughout Western culture.

In 2014, the college celebrated its fiftieth anniversary. The same year, UCSD Housing and Dining opened a new dining commons named "64 Degrees" to replace the old Plaza Cafe and Incredi-Bowls food truck. Most of the Revelle residential campus was renovated from 2009 to 2015.

== History ==
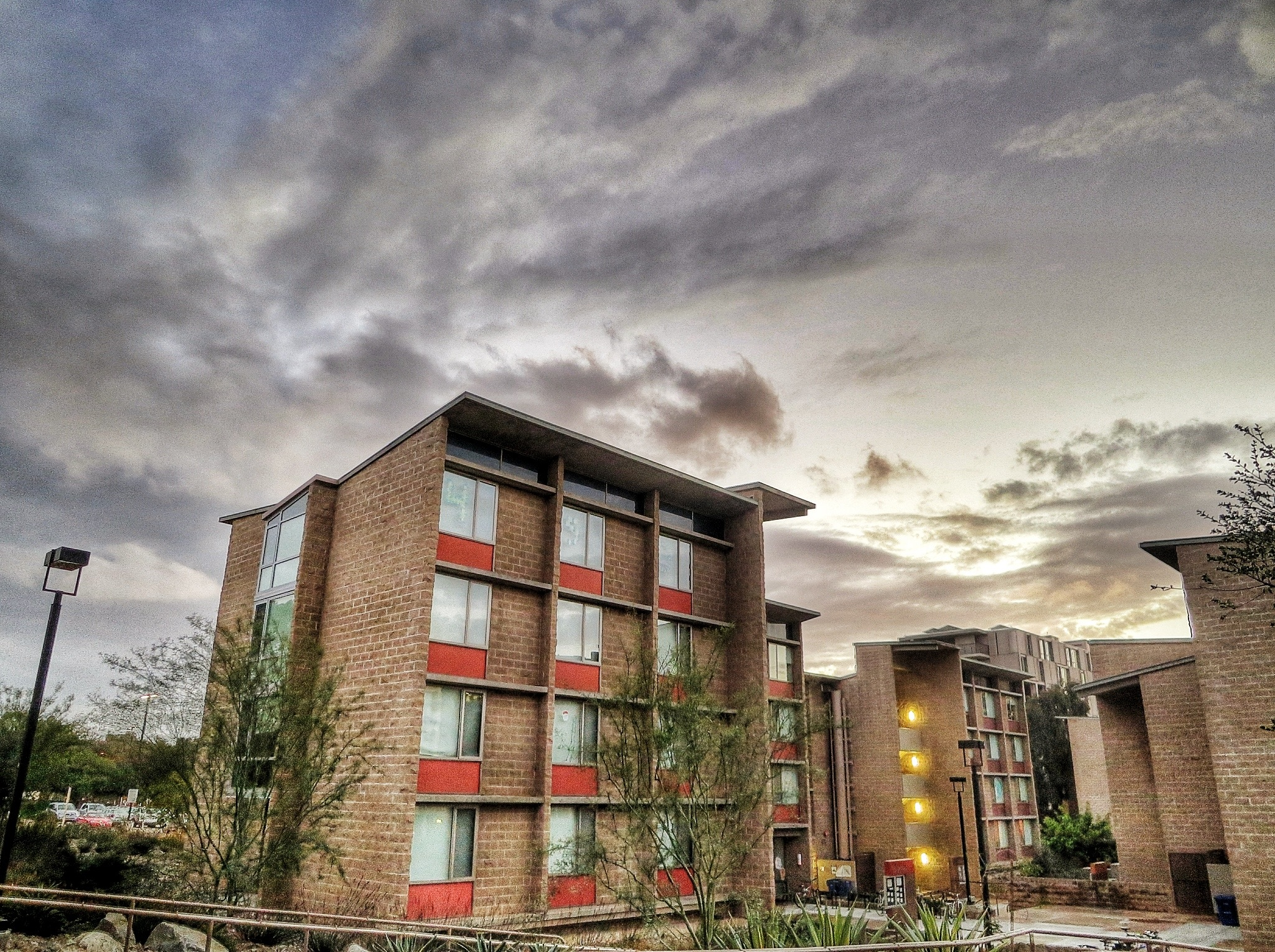
The original residence halls post-remodel

Much of Revelle College's initial history mirrors that of UC San Diego itself, as the development of the first undergraduate college was instrumental in founding the university. The Institute of Technology and Engineering was established in 1958 on a ridge northeast of the Scripps Institution of Oceanography (SIO). The Institute, soon renamed to the School of Science and Engineering, was initially housed at Scripps and headed by Roger Revelle. Ninety-nine faculty were planned to instruct 450 graduate students in earth sciences, biology, physics, chemistry, engineering, and mathematics. Roger Revelle and several recently recruited professors, including Keith Brueckner, James R. Arnold, and David M. Bonner, began to aggressively recruit professors from across the country to their new university. In 1961, construction began on the first permanent building at the new campus. Buildings A and B, now Urey Hall and Mayer Hall respectively, housed laboratories, office space, and lecture halls. They were completed and inaugurated in 1963.

Later in 1963, Chancellor Herbert York began to implement the 1959 master plan as visualized by Revelle, Arnold, and University of California President Clark Kerr. The plan called for the creation of twelve loosely related undergraduate colleges, the first of which York formed by renaming the School of Science and Engineering to simply The First College. Simultaneously, York created the Division of Letters and Science to handle the nascent university's academics; this division would house the original departments of physics, chemistry, and biological sciences, as well as the recently formed departments of philosophy and literature. The first undergraduates enrolled in late 1964.

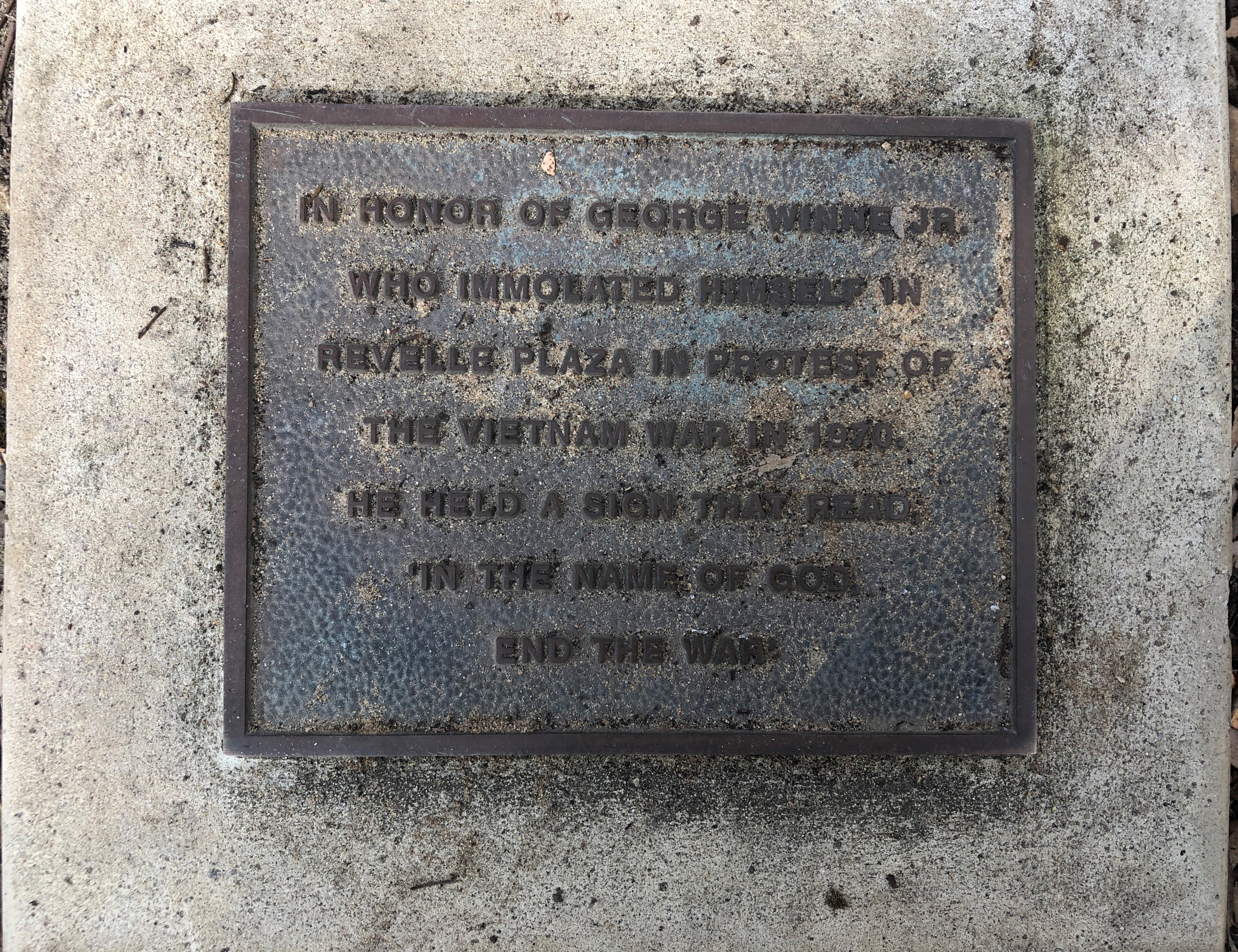
Plaque memorializing the 1970 self-immolation of George Winne Jr.

The First College continued to grow to accommodate increasing undergraduate and graduate enrollment at the university. In early 1965, the Regents of the University of California voted to rename the college in Roger Revelle's honor. Revelle had recently resigned his posts as UCSD Dean of Research and SIO Director to become director of the Center for Population Studies at Harvard University. Revelle College remains the only undergraduate college at UCSD named for a living honoree.

By the start of the 1965-1966 school year, Revelle College had grown to loosely resemble the modern campus, surrounding a central plaza. The completion of the sixth academic building, Building F (now York Hall), marked the end of its growth and the beginning of the establishment of John Muir College. In addition to a library in Building E (Galbraith Hall), the college was equipped to house 440 undergraduates in the newly constructed Fleet residence halls. An 800-seat cafeteria, the Plaza Cafe, was constructed to replace the canteen in the basement of Building C (Mayer Hall). Blake and Argo Halls were added in 1968.

In May 1970, a student protesting the Vietnam War self-immolated in Revelle Plaza holding a sign reading "In God's Name, End the War."

== Campus ==
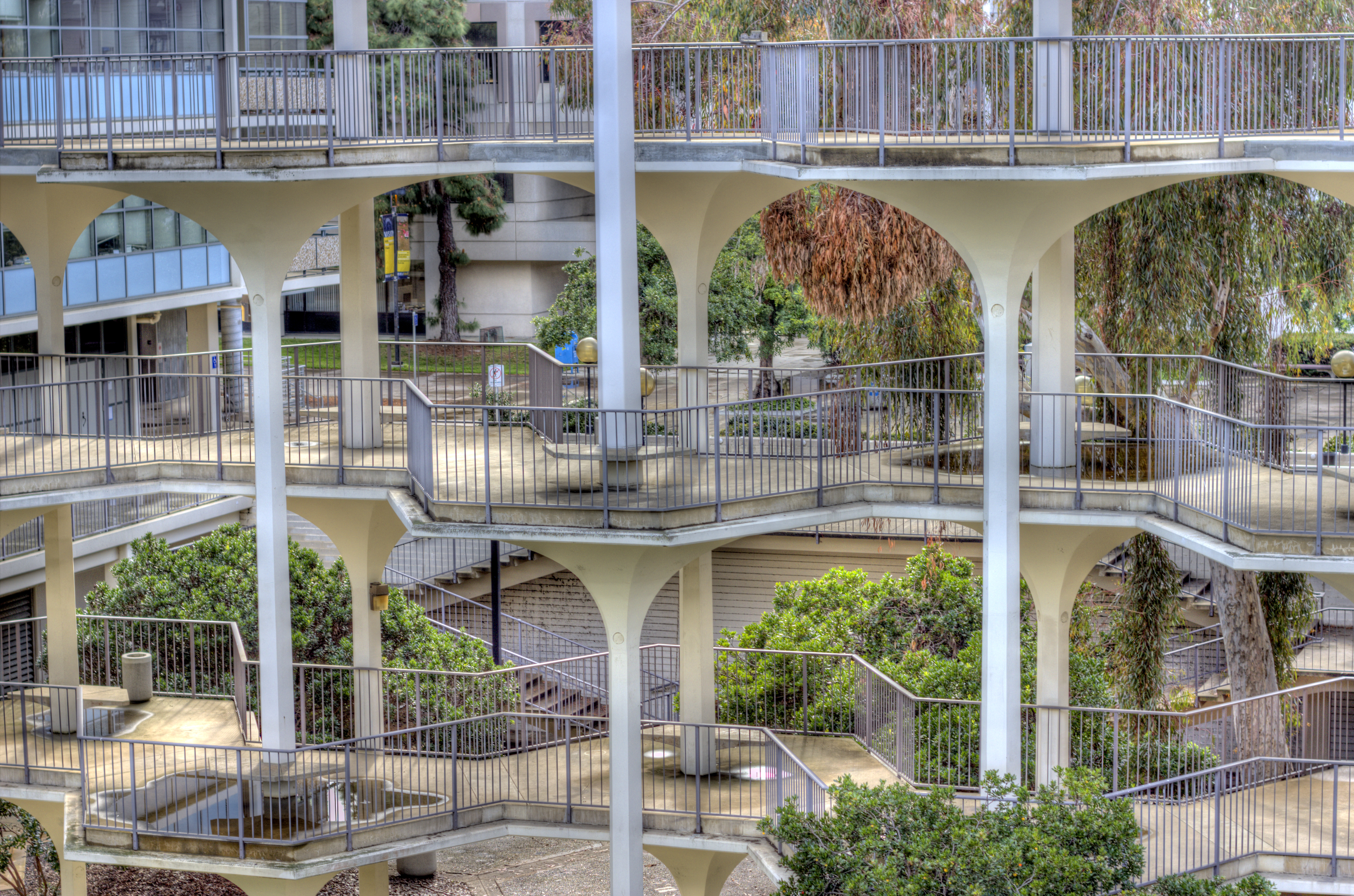
The distinctive breezeway connecting Mayer and Bonner Halls

La Jolla Project, a Stuart Collection piece

The Revelle College grounds encompass the southwest corner of the UC San Diego campus. Revelle is bounded to the west by North Torrey Pines Road, to the north by Muir College's athletic facilities and the Old Student Center, to the east by Gilman Drive and the School of Medicine, and to the south by Scholars Drive South and the Theater District. The college's buildings are laid around a central plaza, with the residential buildings west of the plaza and the academic buildings surrounding the remaining three sides. The southern section of Revelle College is occupied by two large parking lots and grassy hills, and the administration building sits in a grove in the southeast corner.

Revelle Plaza is the centerpiece of Revelle College, and has served as an important space for campus activities and socialization since its creation. During the mid-to-late sixties, Revelle Plaza was the location of many protests. The May 1970 Peace Memorial in its southeast corner commemorates the anti-war self-immolation of Revelle student George Winne Jr. The adjacent fountain was donated by Pacific Southwest Airlines in 1965.

The residential section of the Revelle College campus is located to the west of the plaza. Blake and Argo Halls are between the plaza and the courtyard containing the Anchor. North of this courtyard lies the Revelle Commons complex. In addition to four conference rooms, this complex houses Roger's Market and the Revelle dining commons, 64 Degrees. 64 Degrees serves burgers, Chinese-inspired plates, salads, sandwiches, and American cuisine. In 2015, a full-service restaurant called 64 North was opened to complement 64 Degrees and provide the southern part of campus with an upscale dining option.

There are two major lecture halls in Revelle College, with one located in Galbraith Hall and another in York Hall. The other academic buildings in Revelle are the Natural Sciences Building, Pacific Hall, Mayer Hall, Bonner Hall, and Urey Hall. Collectively, these eight buildings house the Division of Biological Sciences, the Department of Chemistry and Biochemistry, the Humanities Program, the Department of Physics, and the Department of Theatre and Dance. York, Mayer, and Bonner Halls are noted for the unique hexagonal breezeways that connect the buildings.

Revelle College has two Stuart Collection pieces, La Jolla Project by Richard Fleischner and What Hath God Wrought? by Mark Bradford. The former, referred to by the campus community as Stonehenge, gives its nickname to the surrounding Stonehenge Lawn. Other public works of art around Revelle College include El Mac's "Enduring Spell" mural in the Argo courtyard, murals on the side of the Ché Café, a giant red chair by Galbraith Hall, the Stuart Collection works Red Shoe, La Jolla Vista View, and The Wind Garden in the nearby Theatre District, a surrealist mural by Howard Warshaw on the east interior wall of 64 Degrees, and a 56 ft × 22 ft surfer graphic on the east exterior wall of 64 Degrees.

== Academics ==
The Revelle general education curriculum has been one of the most stringent on campus since the college's inception. Provost Daniel Wulbert described the curriculum as having "something there for almost everyone to dislike." Students are expected to complete courses in calculus, science, language, social science, and the fine arts, as well as a five-quarter writing sequence focusing on the literature, history, and philosophy of Western civilization. The curriculum crosses traditional academic disciplinary boundaries in order to encourage the development of "Renaissance men and women."

The five-quarter Humanities sequence forms the cornerstone of Revelle's academic requirements. The sequence requires students to examine and respond to humanistic philosophy and literature. The first two courses, usually taken by first-year students, focus on intensive writing instruction while covering literature and history from the Hebrew Bible, ancient Greece, ancient Rome, the Bible, and the Middle Ages. The following three courses cover the remainder of Western civilization, from Renaissance literature to modern socialist and nationalist movements. Since 2007, Revelle students have also had the option of taking Humanities 3 in Italy through the Revelle in Rome program.

== Residential life ==
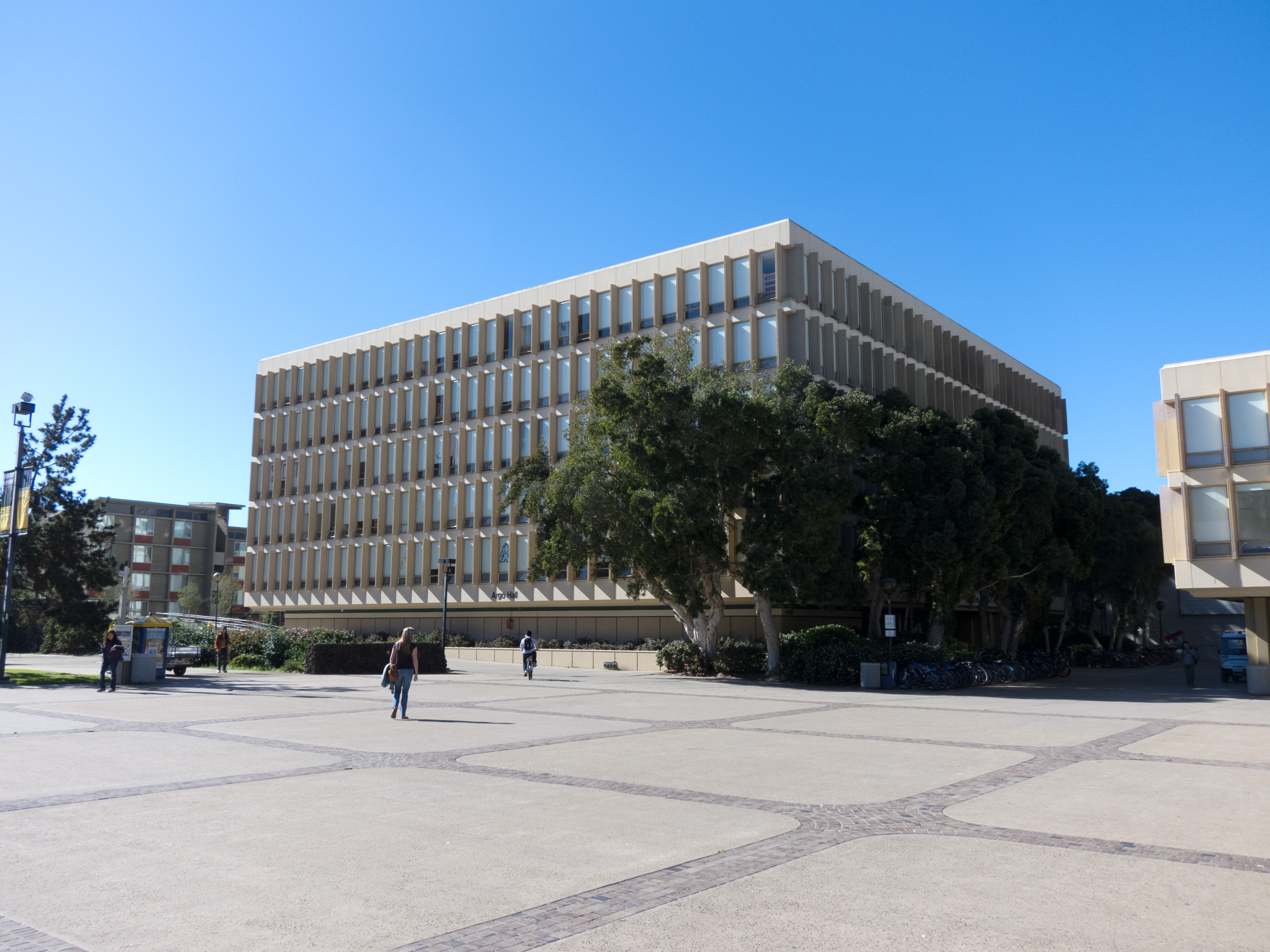
Argo Hall prior to its 2014 remodel

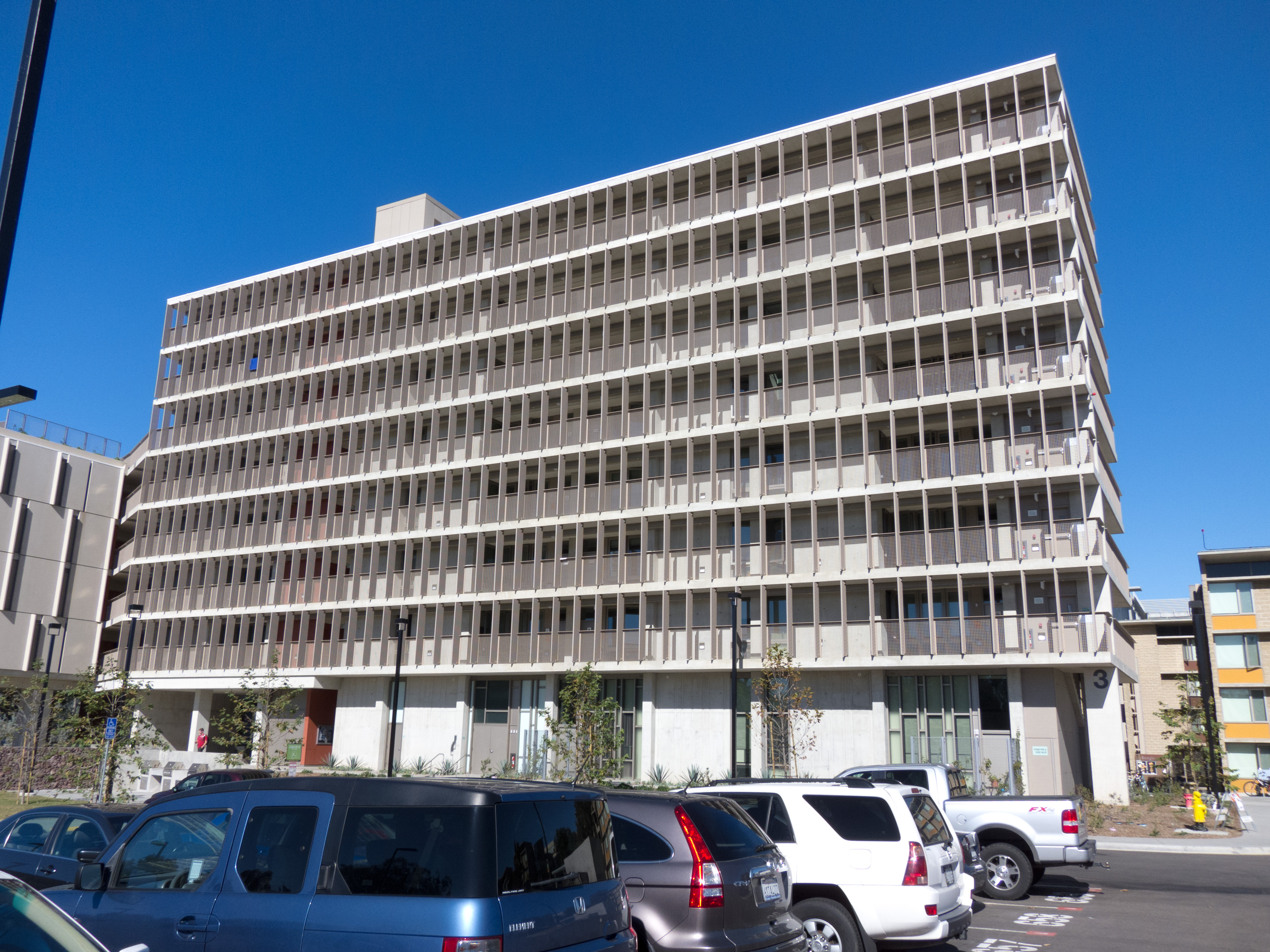
The South Tower of the Keeling Apartments

The Revelle Residence Life office organizes over 500 events each year for students in the residence halls and apartments. Students also participate in organizations and leadership programs funded by Revelle College Council. Revelle's residence halls for first-year students are all named after famous exploring ships:

- Argo
- Atlantis
- Beagle
- Blake
- Challenger
- Discovery
- Galathea
- Meteor

The largest residence hall, Argo Hall, is a six-story building that houses 350 students. Each floor has its own study lounge and kitchen, and the base of the building houses conference rooms, two social lounges, a postal center, and piano practice rooms. Argo Hall was most recently renovated in 2015. Blake Hall is a four-story building with 180 residents, as well as two patios and a large study lounge and kitchen on the uppermost floor. The six remaining residence halls comprise the Fleet residences, each of which houses 110 students above a study lounge. Approximately 40% of the students living in Fleet residence halls are from colleges other than Revelle.

Revelle College offers apartment housing for continuing undergraduates in the Charles David Keeling Apartments. The Keeling Apartments, completed in 2009, are the first LEED platinum-certified residential buildings in the University of California system. The complex is composed of three connected towers that collectively house 510 students. The three buildings—North Tower, West Bar, and South Tower—are divided into eight communities named after the Hawaiian islands of Hawaiʻi, Molokaʻi, Kahoʻolawe, Maui, Lānaʻi, Oʻahu, Niʻihau and Kauaʻi.

== Traditions ==
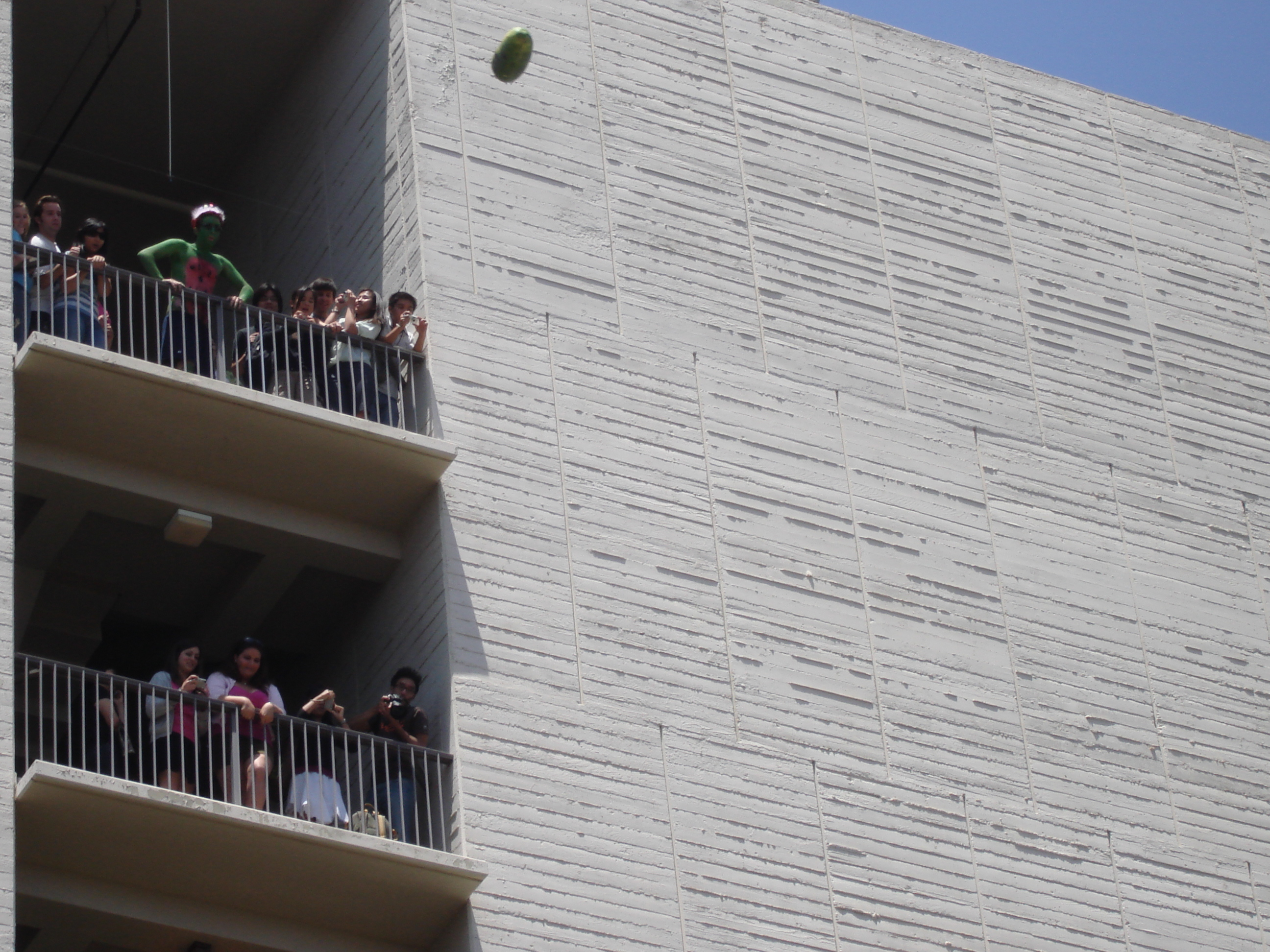
The June 2007 Watermelon Drop

The most well-known Revelle College tradition, the annual Watermelon Drop, takes place every June prior to finals week. The tradition began in 1965, when a physics professor asked his students to calculate the terminal velocity of a watermelon dropped from the seventh floor of Urey Hall. Prior to the event, Revelle College hosts a pageant to name a Watermelon Queen, who drops the watermelon from the same building each year. The Watermelon Queen need not be female. Rarely, a Watermelon Queen and Watermelon King have both been elected.

Other traditions at Revelle include painting the Revelle Anchor, a centrally located anchor that serves as a bulletin board and artistic outlet. UCSD students can spray-paint the anchor every night. Revelle College students also celebrate Roger Revelle's birthday at the end of winter quarter with a barbecue lunch. In the spring, Revelle College Council organizes the Revellution concert, which features local stars and rising independent artists.
