= Lisa Davies (disambiguation) =

Lisa Davies is an American former model.

Lisa Davies may also refer to:

- Lisa Davies (basketball), Women's Basketball Academic All-America of the Year
- Lisa Davies (curler), on 2012-13 Ontario Curling Tour
- Lisa Davies (presenter), on One News (New Zealand)
- Lisa Davies, character in The Tomorrow People

== See also ==
- Lisa Davis (disambiguation)
