= Comparative Studies in Society and History =

- Discipline: History
- Language: English
- Edited by: Paul Christopher Johnson and Geneviève Zubrzycki

Publication details
- History: 1958-present
- Publisher: Cambridge University Press (United Kingdom)
- Frequency: Quarterly

Standard abbreviations
- ISO 4: Comp. Stud. Soc. Hist.

Indexing
- ISSN: 0010-4175 (print); 1475-2999 (web)
- LCCN: 2001-227391
- JSTOR: 00104175
- OCLC no.: 48536082

Links
- Journal homepage; Online access; Online archive

Comparative Studies in Society and History is a peer-reviewed academic journal published quarterly by Cambridge University Press on behalf of the Society for Comparative Study of Society and History. It was established in 1958 by Sylvia L. Thrupp. When she retired as editor-in-chief, she entrusted the journal's editorship and managing editorship to Raymond Grew and his wife Daphne Merriam Grew.

== List of past editors-in-chief ==
- Sylvia L. Thrupp, 1958–1973
- Raymond Grew, 1973–1997
- Thomas R. Trautmann, 1997–2006
- Andrew Shryock, 2006–2016
