= Raymond Grew =

American historian (1930–2020)

- Born: October 28, 1930; San Jose, California, U.S.
- Died: September 13, 2020 (aged 89); Eugene, Oregon, U.S.
- Spouse: Daphne Merriam (married 1952-2013)
- Children: 3

Raymond Grew (October 28, 1930 – September 13, 2020) was an American social historian of France and Italy and a Professor of History Emeritus at the University of Michigan.

Grew graduated from Harvard University in 1951 and received a Ph.D. from Harvard in 1957. During this period, on August 16, 1952, he married Daphne Merriam in Cambridge, Massachusetts.

Grew died in Eugene, Oregon on September 13, 2020, at the age of 89.

== Major publications ==
- Raymond Grew (September 1962). "How Success Spoiled the Risorgimento". The Journal of Modern History. 34 (3).
- Patrick J. Harrigan; Raymond Grew (June 1985). "The Catholic Contribution to Universal Schooling in France, 1850-1906". The Journal of Modern History. 57 (2).
- Raymond Grew (1991). School, State and Society: The Growth of Elementary Schooling in Nineteenth-Century France A Quantitative Analysis. The University of Michigan Press.
- Raymond Grew (1999). Food and Global History. Boulder: Westview Press.
- Raymond Grew (2000). "Culture and Society". In John A. Davis (ed.). Italy in the Nineteenth Century. Oxford: Oxford University Press.
- Raymond Grew (2001). The Construction of Minorities. Ann Arbor: University of Michigan Press.
