= Urey Hall =

Academic building at the University of California, San Diego

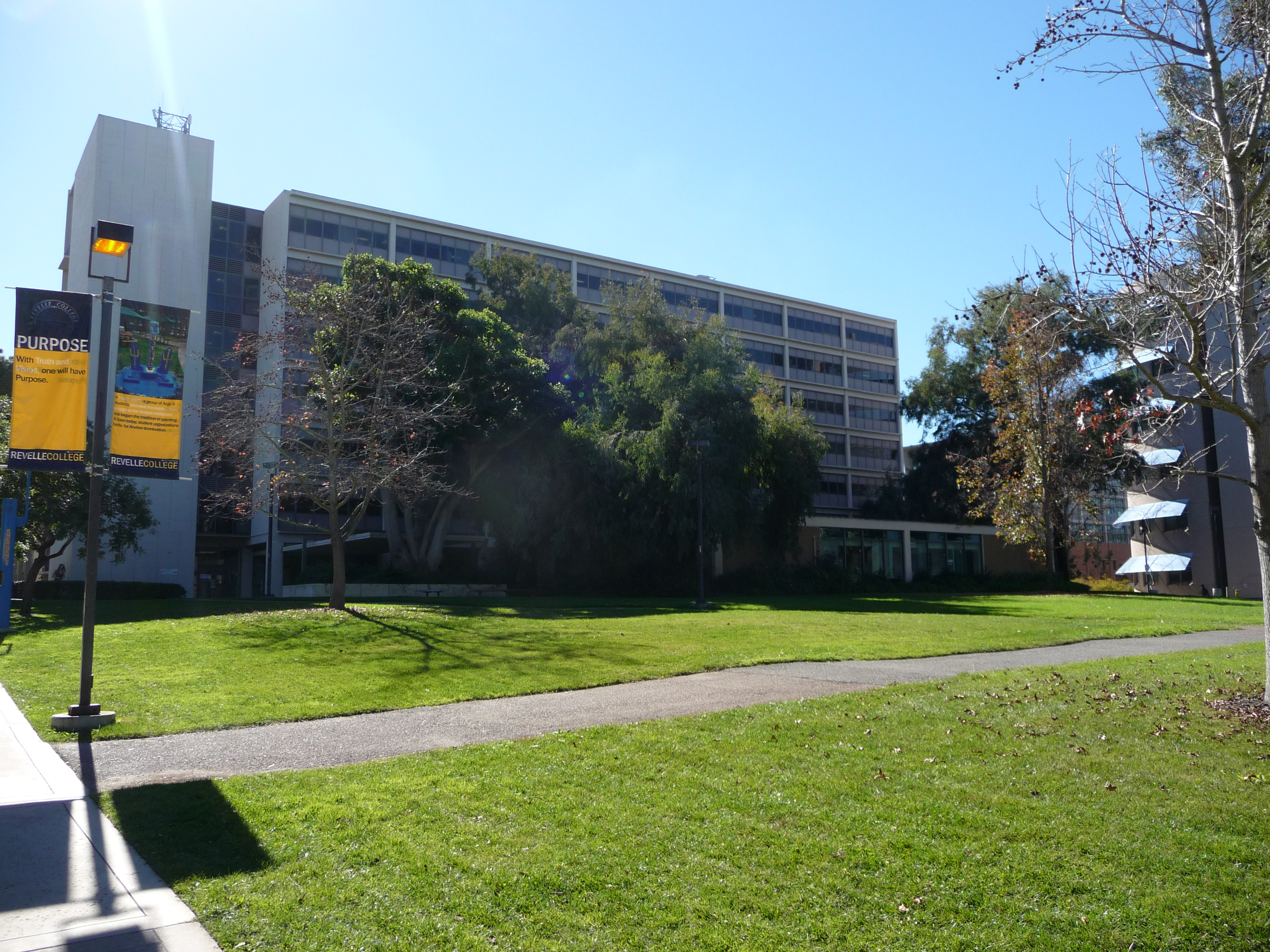
- Urey Hall at UC San Diego
- Interactive map of the Urey Hall area
- Former names: Building A

General information
- Location: Revelle College; University of California, San Diego, La Jolla, California, United States
- Coordinates: 32.8757°N 117.2415°W
- Opened: Early 1963
- Owner: University of California, San Diego

Technical details
- Floor count: 8

Design and construction
- Architecture firm: Risley and Gould

Urey Hall is one of the oldest buildings at the University of California, San Diego. It is located in Revelle College, the first undergraduate college at the university. Urey Hall is named after Nobel laureate Harold Urey, one of the founders of UC San Diego's chemistry department, and his wife Frieda Urey, both of whom were major contributors to the early development of the university. It is mainly used for physical science offices, teaching, and research.

== Facilities ==
Urey Hall is 8 stories tall with around 106,000 square feet of assignable space. UC San Diego's Chemistry stockroom is located in Urey Hall. The Molecular Mass Spectrometry Facility is also in Urey Hall. The building is home to several offices and research labs, especially those for the Department of Chemistry and Biochemistry. Some physics department facilities are also in Urey Hall.

== History ==
UC San Diego was established in 1960, but for the first couple years most of the university's operations took place at the preexisting Scripps Institution of Oceanography campus. In the 1963–1964 school year, faculty and students were finally able to move into the first completed buildings on the new university campus at Revelle College. Urey Hall was the first and tallest of these buildings. Urey Hall, along with Bonner Hall and Mayer Hall, were all designed by architecture firm Risley and Gould. At some points, Urey Hall has been named Building A.

At the time, it housed classrooms, offices, labs, a computer center, and the Science and Engineering Library. The building cost $4 million. It is said that Harold Urey didn't want the building to be associated with his name, as he thought it was ugly. Like many of the first buildings at UC San Diego, it was designed in the Brutalist style.

Starting in 1965 as a science experiment, the Watermelon Drop from the 7th floor of Urey Hall has been an annual tradition for Revelle College. It is the oldest student tradition at UC San Diego.

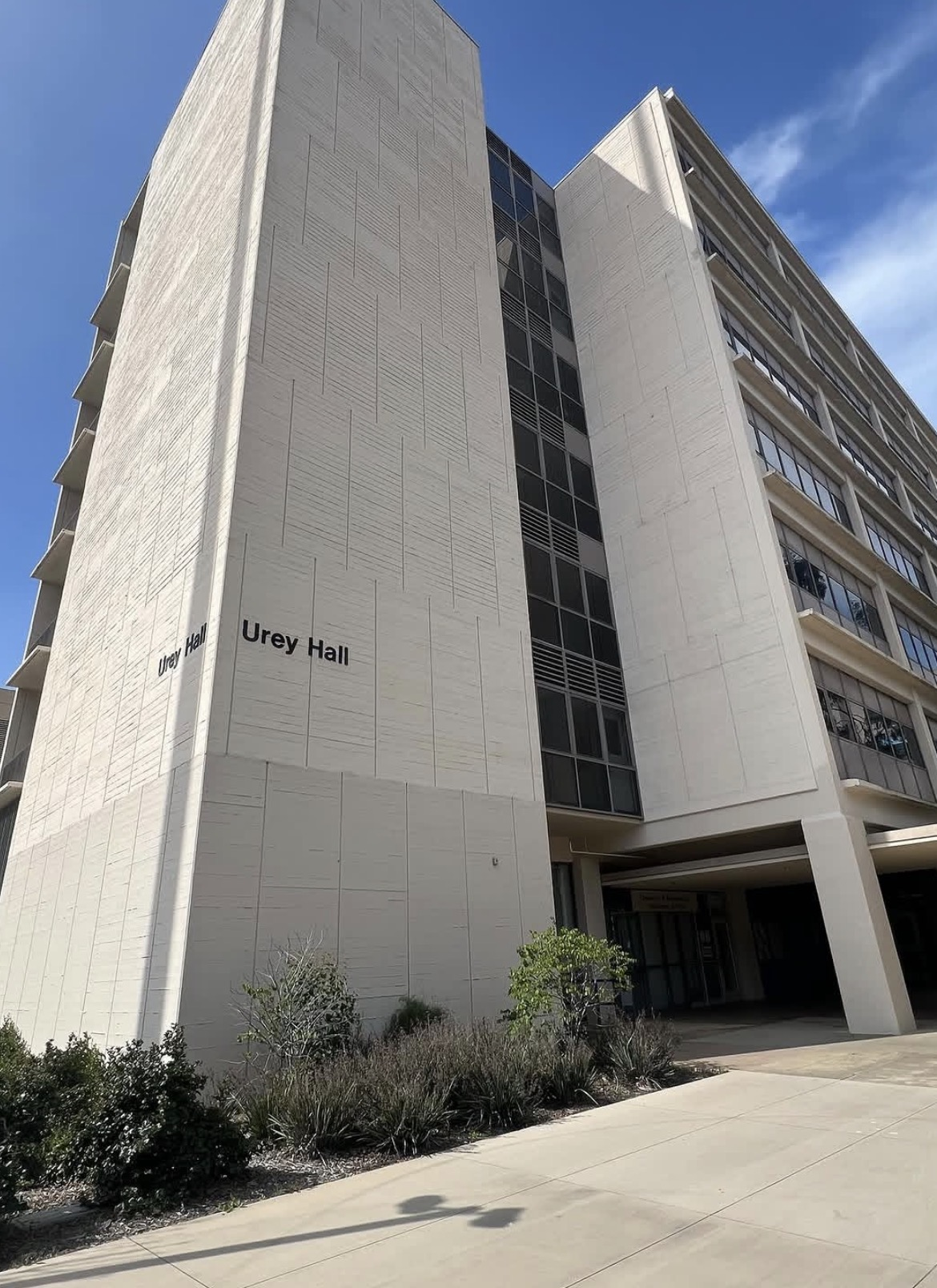
Urey Hall from ground level

In 1970, in response to the Vietnam War and the recent Kent State shooting, several antiwar groups protested by occupying parts of Urey Hall. Since Urey Hall was an important science center, some professors based there has contracts with the United States Department of Defense and were seen by some as complicit in the war. Per student account, no damage was done to the building or its offices.

In 1979, a ceremony was held to dedicate the building to Freida and Harold Urey.

Numerous renovations have occurred at Urey Hall over the years. In 2007, a helicopter was used to replace exhaust fans, for example. Numerous laboratories have also undergone renovations and additions.

In 2014, William E. Moerner won the Nobel Prize in Chemistry. During his time at UC San Diego, he conducted research in Urey Hall, which contributed to his eventual Nobel Prize.
