= Elizabeth Van Wie Davis =

American academic

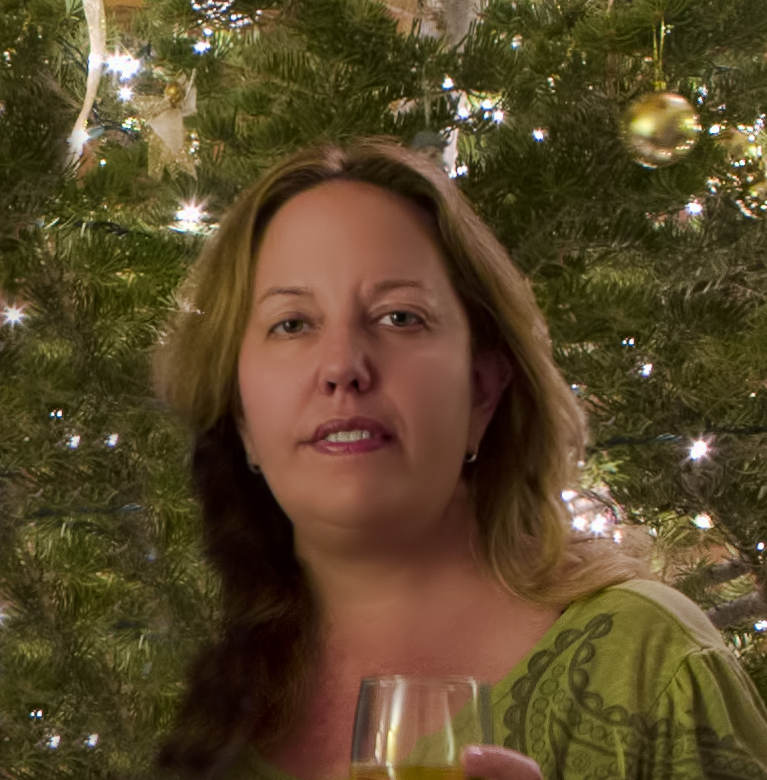
- Born: 1958 (age 67–68)
- Known for: Islam, Oil and Geopolitics: Central Asia after September 11

Elizabeth Van Wie Davis (born 1958) is an American academic specializing in international affairs.

== Education ==
Davis received her BA in Liberal Arts from Shimer College. She obtained her Ph.D. in Foreign Affairs from the University of Virginia in 1985. Her dissertation was a study of East Asian maritime law, titled Oceans Policy: A New Search for Cooperation.

== Career ==
Davis has worked at Mary Baldwin College, Illinois State University, Johns Hopkins University's SAIS Center for Chinese and American Studies in Nanjing, China, and the Asia-Pacific Center for Security Studies, a U.S. Department of Defense academic institute.

After serving as the Director of the Liberal Arts and International Studies Department at the Colorado School of Mines, in 2014, she accepted the position of Vice Dean for Research at Nazarbayev University, which she held for one year. Afterwards, she returned to the Colorado School of Mines as a Professor.

Dr. Davis took a break from academia after 17 years to work for the US government on Asia issues, focusing on preventive diplomacy, including briefing U.S. senators and congressmen, top U.S. military officers, and foreign government leaders on China and Asia-related subjects.

== Bibliography ==
- Ruling, Resources and Religion in China: Managing the Multiethnic State in the 21st Century. (2012) ISBN 1137033835
- Islam, Oil and Geopolitics: Central Asia after September 11 (co-edited with Rouben Azizian). (2006) ISBN 0742541290
- Chinese Perspectives on Sino-American Relations 1950-2000 (edited, Chinese Studies Series, 12). (2000) ISBN 0773478078
- China and the Law of the Sea Convention: Follow the Sea. (1995) ISBN 0773490590
