= Eliza Jeffries Davis =

English historian (1875 – 1943)

Eliza Jeffries Davis FSA (1875–1943) was an English historian specialising in the history of London. She was partly responsible for the establishment of the Institute of Historical Research.

== Early life ==
Davis was born into a wealthy Worcester farming family in 1875. She was educated at Cheltenham College and gained her BA in 1897 from the University of London. Between 1898 and 1904 she taught at Bedford High School and Stepney Pupil Teachers' School. In 1905 she worked as she was elected as a Fellow of the Library Association for her work as a librarian at Moorfields Training College, where she also lectured in English and became Vice-Principal in 1908. During this time she made her first historical publication with her sister Joyce Jeffries Davis, who had studied modern history at St Hilda’s College, Oxford.

In 1913 she completed an MA in History with a thesis on Lollardry in London.

== Academic career ==
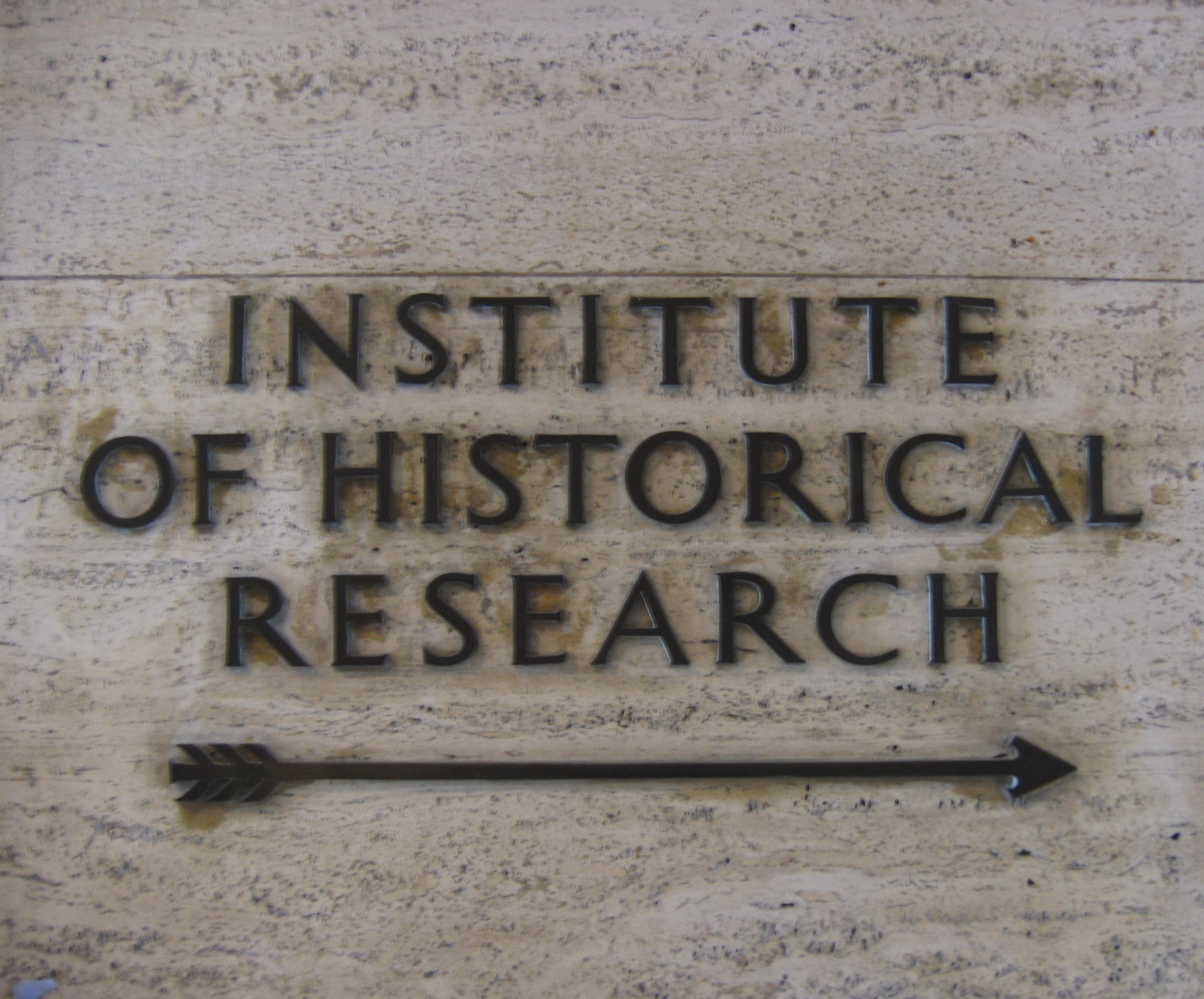
Davis helped to set up the University of London's Institute of Historical Research in 1921.

Appointed as a research assistant in the History Department of University College, London in 1914, Davis became Lecturer in the Sources of English History there in 1919.

From 1921 to 1940 she served as the first University Reader in London History at the University of London. She was a Fellow there, and her students included the Northern Irish historian T.W. Moody. Known as EJD to her close colleagues, she continued to publish articles on the history of London and was involved in several historical societies including the Historical Association, where she was editor of the journal History from 1922 to 1934.

Working closely with Albert Pollard, she played an instrumental role in the establishment of the Institute of Historical Research in 1921 (jokingly called 'Miss Davis's Institute' by a colleague). In its early years she established a library collection as Honorary Librarian, served on its committee, and delivered some of its first seminars. She also served as Acting Secretary and Librarian in 1939 when the incumbent, Charles Guy Parsloe, was seconded to the Ministry of Information during World War II.

She was elected Fellow of the Royal Society of Antiquaries in 1929.
