= Computer Science and Engineering Building (UC San Diego) =

Academic building at the University of California, San Diego

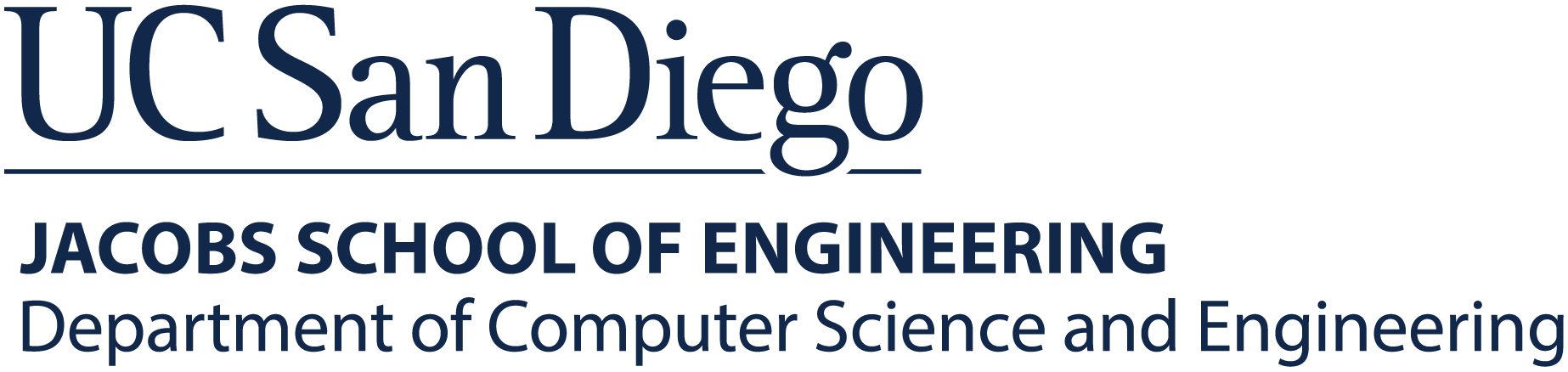

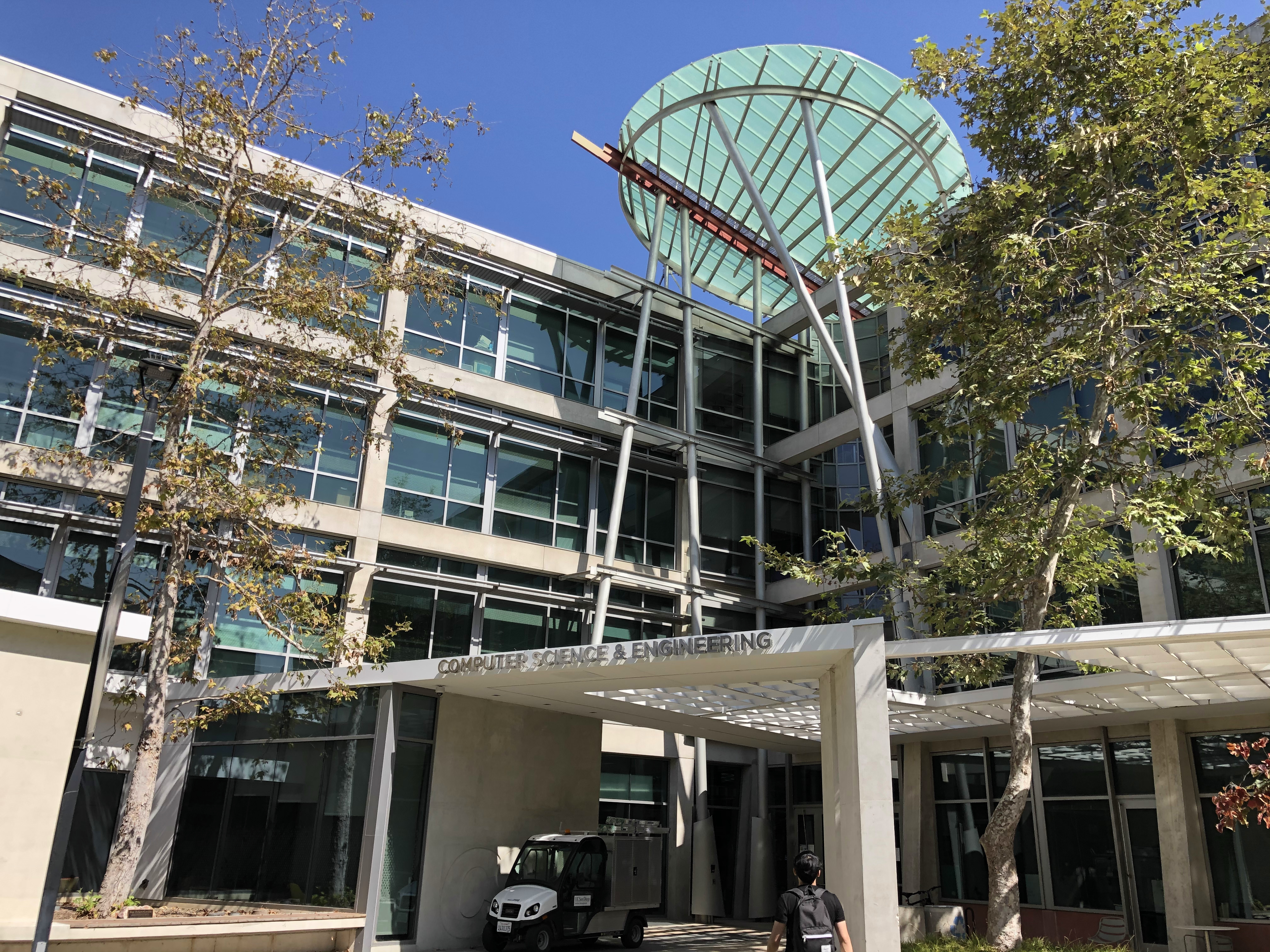
- Main entrance to the Computer Science and Engineering Building
- Interactive map of the Computer Science and Engineering Building area
- Alternative names: EBU-3B (Note: Building abbreviation used in some maps and course scheduling tools)

General information
- Location: Earl Warren College; University of California, San Diego, La Jolla, California, United States
- Coordinates: 32.88195°N 117.23349°W
- Opened: September 30, 2005
- Owner: University of California, San Diego; Jacobs School of Engineering

Technical details
- Floor count: 5 (4 above ground and 1 basement)

Design and construction
- Architecture firm: Bohlin Cywinski Jackson

The Computer Science and Engineering (CSE) Building hosts most of the academic facilities and faculty offices associated with the Department of Computer Science and Engineering at the University of California, San Diego. Like many other academic departments within the Jacobs School of Engineering, the CSE building is situated on Warren Mall within Earl Warren College, one of the eight residential colleges at UC San Diego.

In addition to CSE departmental facilities, the Earl Warren College Administration Complex is also based in the CSE Building.

== Design ==
The CSE Building is 5 stories tall, with 4 floors above ground and 1 basement. It was built to have a contemporary and warm atmosphere.

In the courtyard just outside the CSE Building, the statue Bear is situated. It is a 370,000 pound natural granite sculpture, and is part of UC San Diego's Stuart Collection.

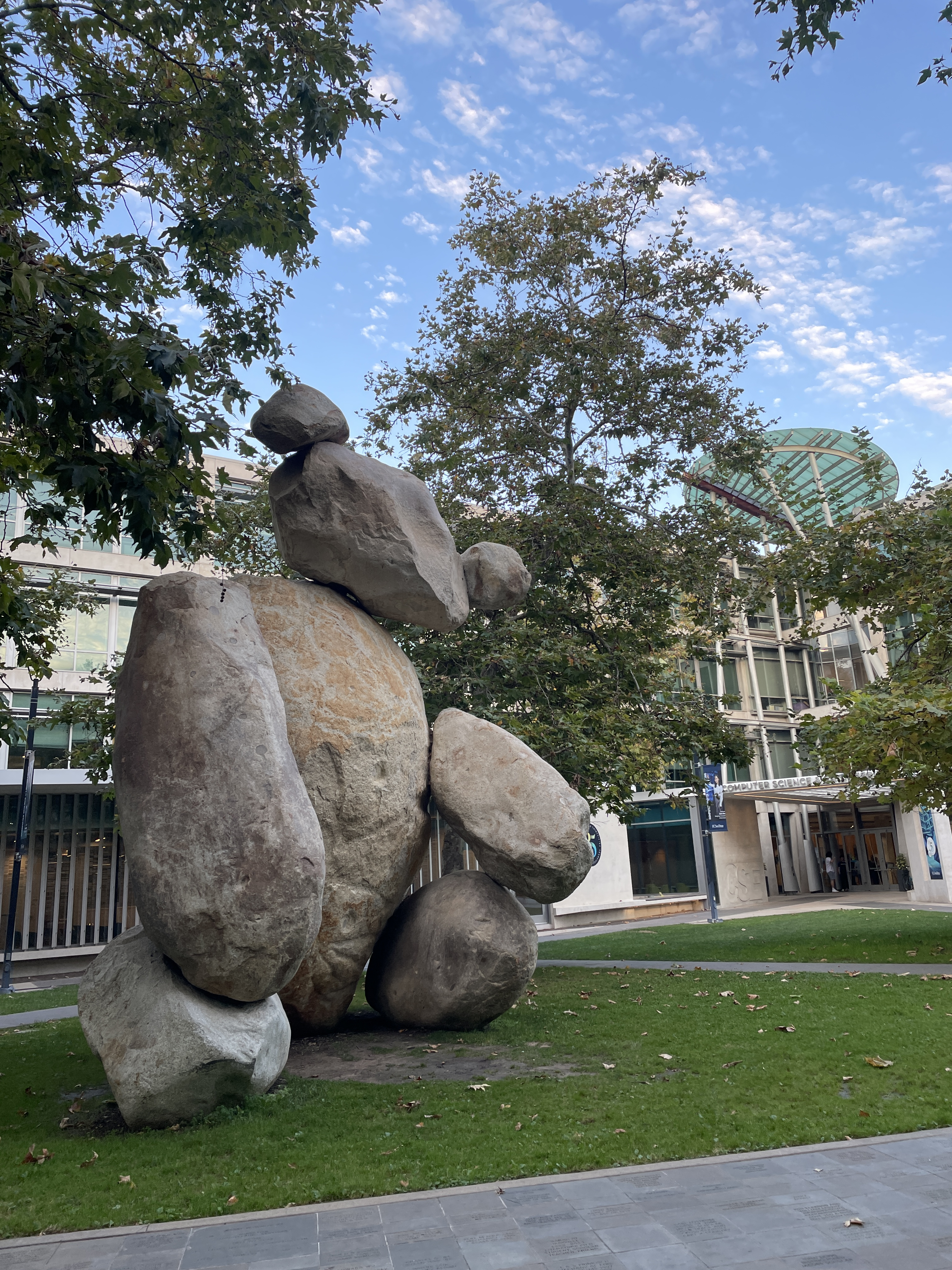
Bear, with the CSE building in the background.

== Facilities ==
The CSE Building includes computer labs, research facilities, meeting and conference rooms, lounges, a common area with study rooms, and plenty of office space. It has elevators and bathrooms on every floor. It also has a student run co-op that provides food and drinks called ChezBob.

== History ==
In 2002, in order to create a sense of community within the CSE department, the CSE Building was designed. The building was opened in September 2005, with costs totaling around $41 million, with funding provided by the state. It was designed by Bohlin Cywinski Jackson and the general contractor was Rudolph and Sletten.

In the years following the construction of the CSE Building, UC San Diego's computer science program saw an explosion in interest and enrollment (both in students and faculty). This led to a shortage in rooms and space. Undergraduate students complained about being put into basement computer labs, for example, which isolated them from researchers, graduate students, and faculty on the upper floors. In fall 2015, the department had over 2000 undergraduate students, and at the time was the largest computer science department in the University of California system.

In 2015, a 7,000 foot remodeling of the building began, which planned to add the Design Innovation Center and more lab space. The renovations also helped integrate the basement to the upper floors, which addressed some of the undergraduate concerns. A majority of the funding came from the Inspiring Imaginations campaign, which raised around $25 million.

Throughout 2015 and 2016, other renovations were also planned. For example, a Master's Commons area was designed on the second floor, and additions would be made to the first floor and basement as well. About 4,500 square feet of new meeting-room space was planned. Along with interior renovations, exterior renovations were also planned. These renovations were completed in 2017.

In October 2025, a new server room was added to the basement of the CSE Building, expected to help the CSE department handle the growing demands of AI Computing. As of 2026, future planned renovations include making the lobby and first floor more welcoming and relocating office staff throughout offices on the first floor, which would open up upper floors for the growing needs of faculty and students.
