= Jacobs School of Engineering =

Engineering school at UC San Diego, U.S.

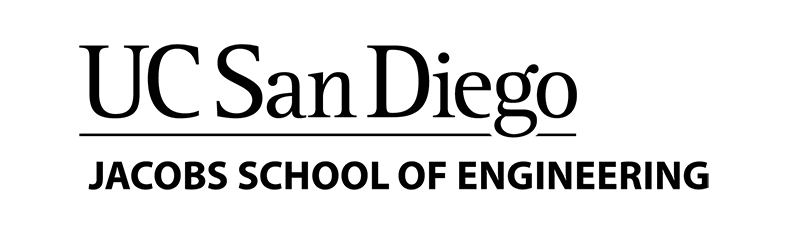
- Other names: Irwin and Joan Jacobs School of Engineering
- Former name: Division of Engineering
- Type: Public
- Established: 1992; 34 years ago
- Parent institution: University of California San Diego
- Dean: Albert P. Pisano
- Faculty: 248
- Undergraduates: 5,857
- Postgraduates: 2,951
- Location: La Jolla, San Diego, California, U.S. 32.8815°N 117.235°W
- Website: jacobsschool.ucsd.edu

The Jacobs School of Engineering is the engineering school of the University of California, San Diego.

== History ==
Engineering programs began at UCSD during the 1964 academic year with a broad applied science department in the areas of aerospace engineering, solid mechanics, bioengineering, and materials science. The first chair of the Department of Aeronautical (later Aerospace) and Mechanical Engineering Sciences (AMES), Sol Penner, recruited numerous experts in their fields from the California Institute of Technology. The first four faculty members recruited including Penner were Hugh Bradner, Forman A. Williams and Sinai Rand, who were followed by Paul A. Libby and others. Penner would later recollect that "Roger Revelle's dream of building a State University with emphasis on distinguished graduate work had immediate appeal for me because it was consonant with what [he] had become familiar at the California Institute of Technology." These recruits included the second and third chairs of the department, John W. Miles and Eric Reissner. During Miles' tenure, the department would be renamed to the Department of Applied Mechanics and Engineering Sciences, distinguishing it from the second engineering department. Founded in 1965 by Henry G. Booker as the Department of Applied Electrophysics, it would be renamed the Department of Applied Physics and Information Science. Both departments quickly achieved international acclaim for the high-quality research they supported. Additionally, undergraduate engineering instruction began in 1968 with a BA degree in information and computer science.

Research achievements in the 1970s included faculty member Hannes Alfvén's receipt of the 1970 Nobel Prize in Physics and Kenneth Bowles's development of UCSD Pascal. In 1982, UCSD combined the engineering departments into the Division of Engineering, led by the first dean, Lea Rudee. The university's Division of Engineering was reorganized into the School of Engineering in 1992, which the school considers its formal founding year. This time, Robert Conn, an expert in plasma physics and semiconductors was chosen to lead the new School. In 1997, when Qualcomm founder and former UCSD engineering professor Irwin Jacobs and his wife Joan Jacobs provided a $15 million endowment for the School, the School went through a final name change leading to the current name in their honor. Six years later, Irwin and Joan Jacobs added to the endowment with a $110 million gift for scholarships, fellowships, and faculty support.

== Campus ==
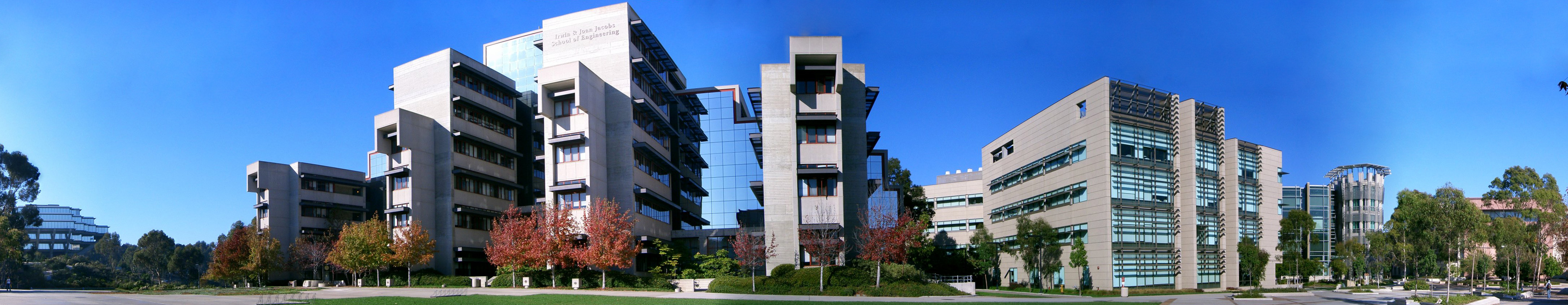
Panorama of Warren Mall showing from left to right: Geisel Library, Jacobs Hall, Powell-Focht Bioengineering Hall, the Computer Science and Engineering Building, and EBU 2 (through trees)

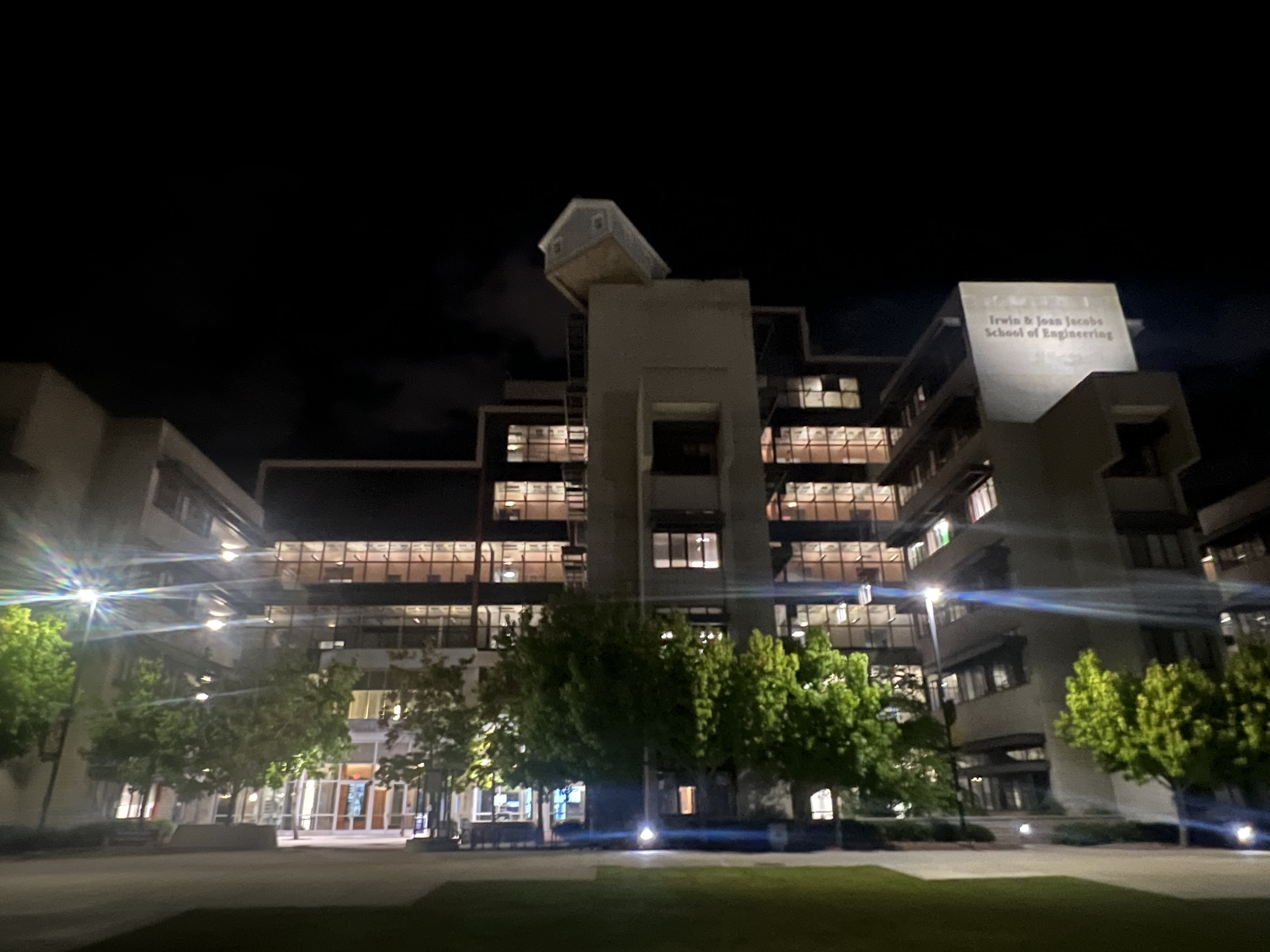
Jacobs Hall at night

The School of Engineering occupies ten buildings on 20 acres in and around Earl Warren College on the UC San Diego campus. These buildings are Jacobs Hall (Engineering Building Unit 1), Powell-Focht Bioengineering Hall, Atkinson Hall (Calit2), Computer Science and Engineering Building, Engineering Building Unit 2, Structural and Materials Engineering Building, Charles Lee Powell Structural Systems Laboratory, High Bay Physics Building, Science and Engineering Research Facility, and Center for Memory and Recording Research. The primary thoroughfare, Warren Mall, runs from Geisel Library's Snake Path at its western end to EBU 2 at its eastern terminus. Two new collaborative and learning spaces, the Design and Innovation Building and the Franklin Antonio Hall, were opened in November 2021 and September 2022 respectively.

=== Public art ===
Fallen Star overlooks Warren Mall.

Warren Mall features four recognizable works of public art belonging to the Stuart Collection. The oldest of these, Bruce Nauman's Vices and Virtues, was completed in 1988 as a series of neon signs superimposing the seven deadly sins and seven virtues over the Powell Structural Systems Laboratory. Alexis Smith's Snake Path was built to link Warren Mall to Geisel Library in 1992. Tim Hawkinson's 2005 work Bear frames the academic courtyard north of Warren Mall, and in 2012 Do Ho Suh's Fallen Star was mounted slightly askew on top of Jacobs Hall.

== Academics and research ==
The Jacobs School of Engineering is currently home to six distinct engineering departments, offering eighteen undergraduate majors, sixteen master's degrees, and twelve Ph.D. programs. Undergraduate admission to each of these departments is capped, meaning that applicants who are not directly accepted to the major as freshmen or new transfers must apply for acceptance.

=== Shu Chien-Gene Lay Department of Bioengineering ===
The Department of Bioengineering was founded in 1994, however its degree programs began in 1966 under the leadership of Y.C. Fung as part of the Aerospace and Mechanical Engineering Sciences Department. At the time, it was the first biomedical engineering program in the nation. In Fall 2025, the department housed 38 faculty, 513 undergraduates, and 518 graduate students in 5 MS/MEng and 2 PhD programs. Undergraduates can choose from four majors within the department, namely bioengineering, biotechnology, bioinformatics, and biosystems. All majors are ABET-accredited, except bioinformatics. Programs for students pursuing graduate degrees include a five-year BS/MS, MS and MEng degrees, PhD degrees, and a joint MD/PhD with the School of Medicine. In 2022, the department became the first "main campus" departments in the UC system to named from an endowed gift. CEO of BioLegend Dr. Gene Lay provided a $25M gift to the department to support new infrastructure and research. The department was renamed the Shu Chien-Gene Lay Department of Bioengineering, in honor of Dr. Lay and his longstanding relationship with emeritus faculty member Dr. Shu Chien.

=== Computer Science and Engineering ===
The Department of Computer Science and Engineering is the largest engineering department in the UC system. It houses 67 faculty, 1,933 undergraduates, and 873 graduate students. The department was spun off in 1987 from the Department of Electrical Engineering and Computer Sciences. Undergraduate students in the department may obtain a BS or BA in computer science, a BS in computer engineering, or a BS in bioinformatics. The data science program at UCSD is jointly operated by the CSE, Mathematics, and Cognitive Science departments. Graduate students may obtain an MS, MAS, PhD, or combined BS/MS degree.

=== Electrical and Computer Engineering ===
The Department of Electrical and Computer Engineering was founded in 1987 as part of the former Department of Electrical Engineering and Computer Sciences' split. The department has 52 faculty members, 1,132 undergraduates, and 673 graduate students. Undergraduates may choose a BS program in electrical engineering, engineering physics, or computer engineering, or they can pursue a BA in "electrical engineering and society." Graduate students pursuing a master's or PhD can pursue a specialization in applied ocean sciences, applied physics/electronic devices and materials, communication theory and systems/magnetic recording, computer engineering, electronic circuits and systems, intelligent systems, robotics, and control, medical devices and systems, nanoscale devices and systems, photonics, or signal and image processing.

=== Mechanical and Aerospace Engineering ===
The Department of Mechanical and Aerospace Engineering was founded in 1964 as AMES, the first engineering department at UC San Diego. It was renamed to MAE in 1999. The department has 44 faculty members, 1,092 undergraduates, and 547 graduate students. Undergraduate students pursue BS degrees in aerospace engineering, environmental engineering, and mechanical engineering. Graduate students may obtain MS, MAS, and PhD degrees in the areas of applied and solid mechanics, material sciences, fluid mechanics, energy, thermal sciences, engineering physics, dynamic systems and controls, environmental engineering, biomechanics, and design.

=== Aiiso Yufeng Li Family Department of Chemical and Nano Engineering ===
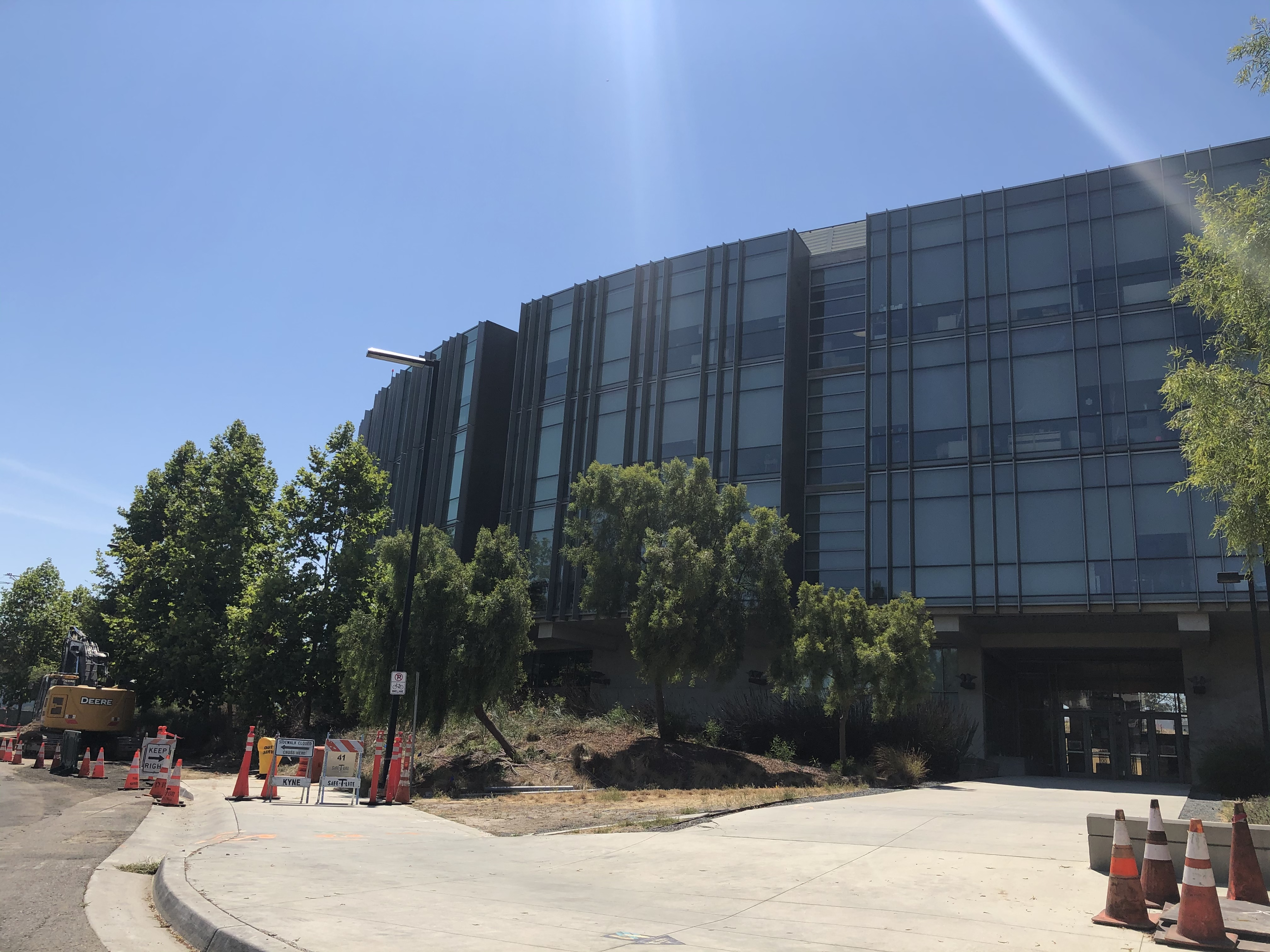
The SME Building, the home of the NanoEngineering department of Jacobs School

The Aiiso Yufeng Li Family Department of Chemical and Nano Engineering, founded in 2007, is the youngest engineering department in the Jacobs School. It is the first nanoengineering department in the United States to offer both undergraduate and graduate degree programs. As of 2019, it has 30 faculty members, 722 undergraduates, and 200 graduate students. In fall of 2008, NanoEngineering took administrative control of chemical engineering. The undergraduate nanoengineering program was awarded ABET accreditation in 2010, the first of its kind in the nation to receive such accreditation. Undergraduates can choose an engineering focus in bioengineering, chemical engineering, electrical engineering, mechanical engineering, or materials science. Graduate students can obtain MS and PhD degrees in either nanoengineering or chemical engineering.

=== Structural Engineering ===
The Department of Structural Engineering split from the former Department of Applied Mechanics and Engineering Sciences in 1999. However, its independence from the department predates this split, as the Structural Systems Research group was separately administered beginning in 1993. Presently, the department has 24 faculty, 517 undergraduates, and 201 graduate students housed in the Structural and Materials Engineering building. Undergraduate students are limited to pursuing a degree in structural engineering. Graduate students may obtain an MS in Structural Engineering or Structural Health Monitoring, as well as a PhD in structural engineering with various specializations.

=== Research centers ===
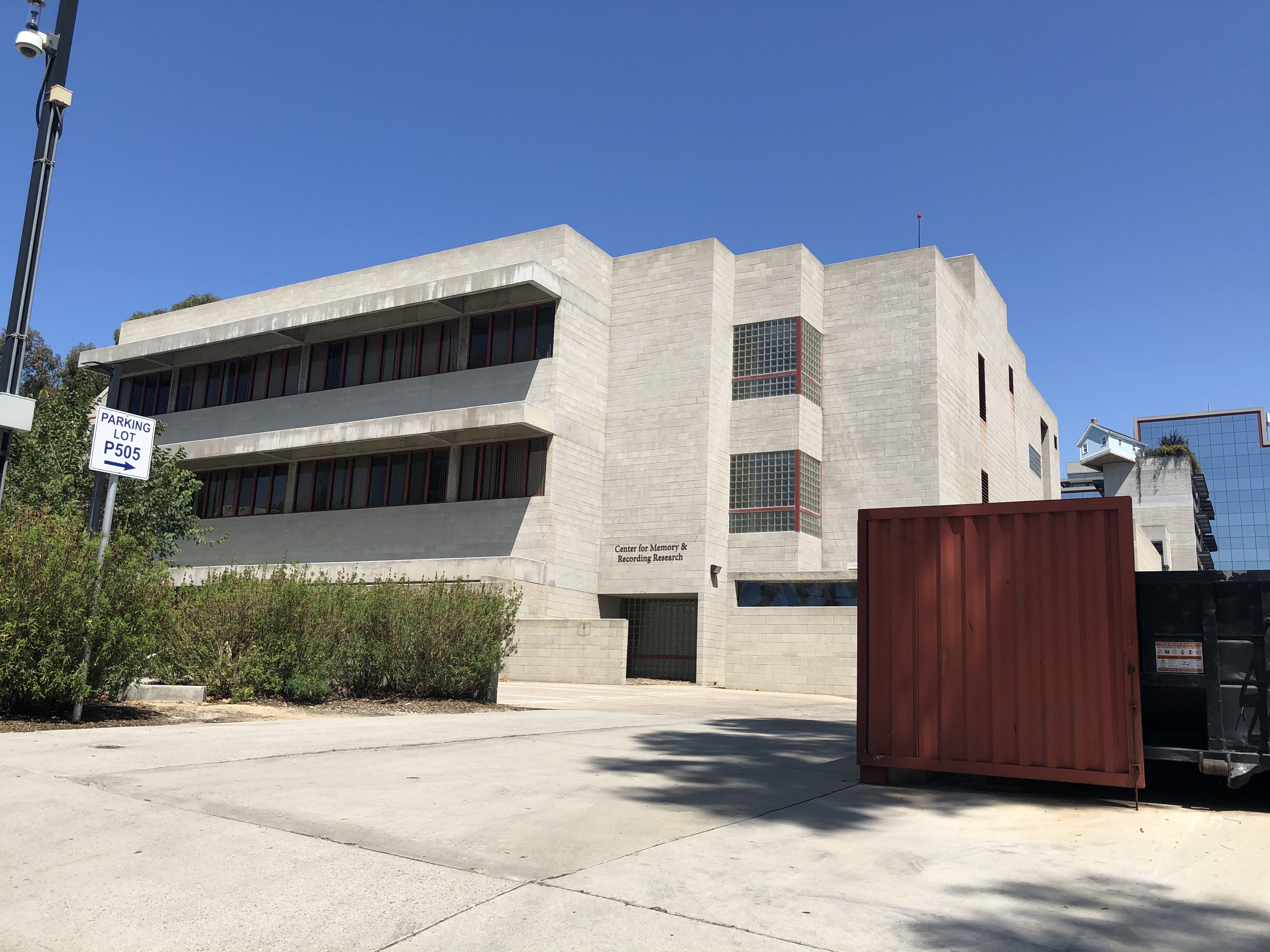
The Center for Memory and Recording Research, a facility at the campus

The Jacobs School is also affiliated with several academic centers and institutes. These include:

- Institute for Materials Discovery and Design
- Center for Extreme Events Research
- Center for Wearable Sensors
- Center for Algorithmic and Systems Biology
- Center For Energy Research
- Center for Microbiome Innovation
- Sustainable Power and Energy Center
- Center for Memory and Recording Research
- Center for Networked Systems
- Center for Wireless Communications
- Charles Lee Powell Structural Research Laboratories
- Cymer Center for Control Systems and Dynamics
- Gordon Engineering Leadership Center
- IDEA Engineering Student Center
- Information Theory and Applications Center
- Institute of Engineering in Medicine
- Moxie Center for Student Entrepreneurship
- San Diego Supercomputer Center
- Qualcomm Institute (UC San Diego Division of California Institute for Telecommunications and Information Technology)
- Whitaker Center for Biomedical Engineering
- Institute for the Global Entrepreneur

== Reputation ==
The Jacobs School of Engineering overall ranks 9th in the United States, and 5th in the nation among public universities according to the U.S. News & World Report Best Graduate Schools rankings. The Jacobs School of Engineering maintains up to date rankings information on the rankings page on their website.

Graduate program rankings from the U.S. News & World Report Best Graduate Schools rankings published in March 2020:

- Aerospace / aeronautical / astronautical engineering ranks #18
- Bioengineering #4
- Chemical engineering ranks #56
- Civil engineering ranks #21 (Structural engineering Dept)
- Computer engineering: #12
- Electrical / electronic / communications engineering ranks #14
- Materials engineering ranks #31
- Mechanical engineering ranks #17
- Computer Science graduate programs (ranked most recently by US News in 2018)
- Computer systems #11
- Computer science (overall) #16
- Computer science theory #14
- Programming language #13

The Jacobs School of Engineering is also the 10th best in the world for engineering/technology and computer sciences, according to an academic ranking of the top 100 world universities published online in February 2008 by the Institute of Higher Education, Shanghai Jiao Tong University.

== Leadership ==
Albert P. Pisano (born 1954) is Dean of the Jacobs School of Engineering at the University of California San Diego (UC San Diego), a position he has held since September 2013. Pisano served on the mechanical engineering faculty of the University of California at Berkeley College of Engineering (UC Berkeley) from 1983 to 2013. Pisano was elected to the National Academy of Engineering in 2001 “for contributions to the design, fabrication, commercialization, and educational aspects of microelectromechanical systems (MEMS).”

== See also ==
- University of California San Diego
- Engineering colleges in California
