= Fallen Star =

Art installation in San Diego, California, U.S.

Coordinates: 32°52′42.76″N 117°14′23.08″W

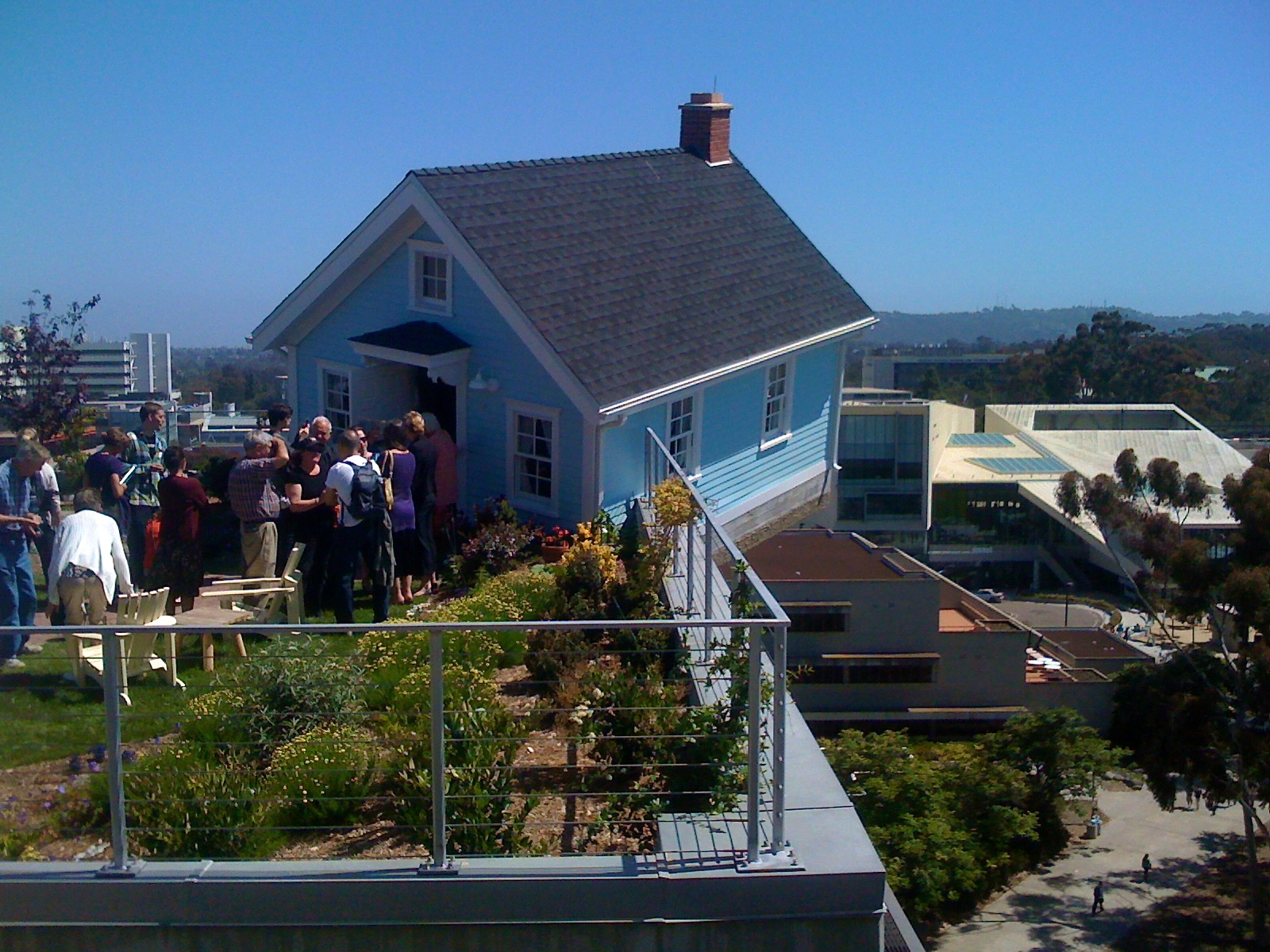
- Artist: Do Ho Suh
- Year: 2012
- Type: sculpture
- Location: Stuart Collection, University of California, San Diego, La Jolla

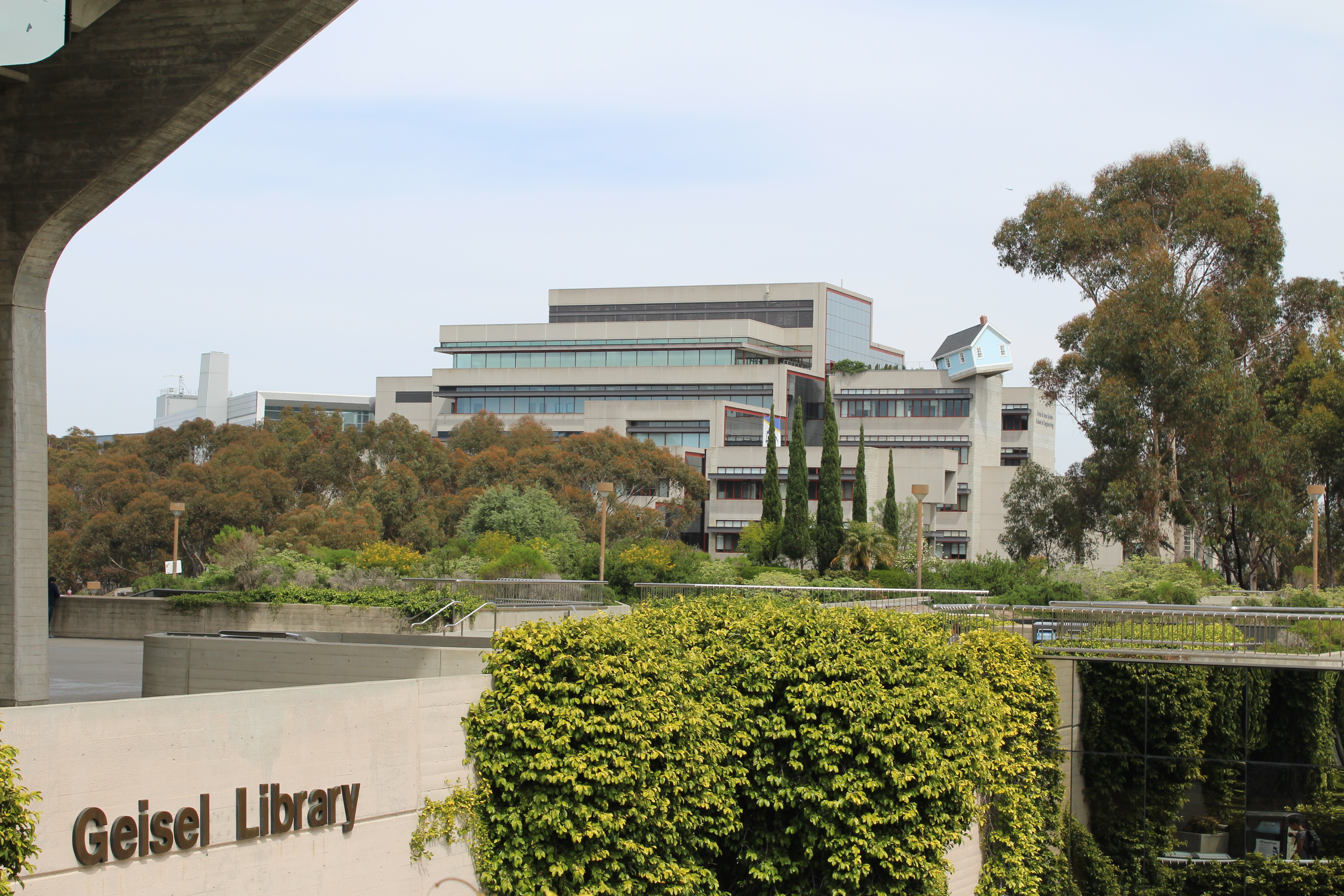
Fallen Star as viewed from Geisel Library

Fallen Star is an art installation by South Korean artist Do Ho Suh on the grounds of the University of California, San Diego. It is a cottage perched at an angle off the edge of the main Jacobs School of Engineering building (Jacobs Hall).

The structure was installed at UC San Diego in July 2012 and has become one of the icons of the campus' Stuart Collection of public art. It is visible from Geisel Library and Warren Mall. The life-size installation weighs nearly 70,000 pounds and provides views of Geisel Library, Bruce Nauman's Vices and Virtues, the surrounding region and the campus' eucalyptus groves. The attraction can be accessed by appointment on Wednesdays and Thursdays from 11:30AM until 1:30PM by visiting the seventh floor of Jacobs Hall (EBU-I). A small landscaped garden with East Coast plants surrounds a brick path leading to the front door. Inside, the 15 ft × 18 ft house slopes at a 5° angle and is fully furnished. It has been given the fake address 72 Blue Heron Way.

Fallen Star forces visitors to juxtapose the comforts of home with the unsettling impersonal nature of a large academic institution. In 2016, it was the subject of a 50-minute documentary produced by the artist and directed by Vera Brunner-Sung and Valerie Stadler, titled Fallen Star: Finding Home.
