= Kathryn Shevelow =

American historian

- Born: US
- Occupation: Professor
- Known for: a specialist in eighteenth-century British literature and culture

Kathryn Shevelow is professor emerita at the University of California, San Diego, United States. She is a specialist in eighteenth-century British literature and culture. In 1999, she won the Earl Warren College Outstanding Teaching Award, and in 2005 she received UCSD's Academic Senate Distinguished Teaching Award. She grew up in southwestern Ohio and earned her doctorate from UCSD.

In 2008, Shevelow authored a history of animal protection, titled For the Love of Animals.

== Works ==
- Women and Print Culture: The Construction of Femininity in the Early Periodical (Routledge, 1990)
- Charlotte: Being a True Account of an Actress’s Flamboyant Adventures in Eighteenth-Century London’s Wild and Wicked Theatrical World (Henry Holt, 2005)
- For the Love of Animals: The Rise of the Animals Protection Movement (Henry Holt, 2008)
