= Jessica Chen =

American business communication advisor

- Citizenship: United States
- Education: University of California, San Diego
- Occupations: Communication advisor, journalist, speaker, author
- Notable work: “Smart, Not Loud”
- Website: jessicachenpage.com

Jessica Chen is an American business communication advisor, speaker, author, and journalist. Chen is the founder of Soulcast Media and the author of Smart, Not Loud: How to Get Noticed at Work for All the Right Reasons.

== Career ==
Chen studied international relations at Earl Warren College, University of California, San Diego. She began her career in journalism as a news reporter at Time Warner Cable from 2008 to 2015. From 2015 to 2017 she was a reporter at ABC 10News in San Diego where she won a 2017 Emmy Award from the National Academy of Television Arts & Sciences Pacific Southwest Chapter for her work in broadcast journalism. Chen also reported for NBC 4 News, Fox 5 and the Shanghai Daily.

In 2018, she founded Soulcast Media, a business communication training company where she conducts leadership training and speaking engagements with Fortune 100 companies.

Chen delivered the TedX Talk “For the Quiet Minority at Work,” in 2022, where she talked about tackling being a minority in a workplace and the communication friction experienced, including communication strategies to build visibility.

In July 2024, she published Smart, Not Loud: How to Get Noticed at Work for All the Right Reasons with Penguin Random House, a book about workplace communication, which was named a Next Big Idea Must Read. The book introduced the concepts of quiet culture and loud culture. She argues many people who grew up with Eastern values often find themselves feeling stuck when working in a Western environment. The book presents her approach to being noticed at work through career-brand building, self-advocacy, and building credibility through strategic communication skills. She introduced the concept of creating a “Yay Folder,” as a way to compile workplace wins.

She joined Columbia University's School of Engineering faculty in 2025 as an instructor in professional development and communication skills.

In January 2026, Chen was named the host of iHeartMedia's business podcast, Leading by Example: Executives Making an Impact where she interviews executives and entrepreneurs to uncover how their experiences shape the way they lead their organizations.
