= Tim Hawkinson =

American artist (born 1960)

- Born: 1960 (age 65–66); San Francisco
- Movement: Contemporary Art
- Spouse: Patty Wickman
- Awards: Guggenheim Fellowship

Tim Hawkinson (born 1960) is an American artist who mostly works as a sculptor.

== Education ==
Hawkinson was born in San Francisco, California in 1960. He received a BFA from San Jose State University in 1984, and a MFA from the University of California, Los Angeles in 1989.

== Work ==
Hawkinson′s work is mostly sculptural, ranging in scale from minute to huge. His themes include his own body (although some of his work could be called self portraiture), music, and the passing of time, as well as his artistic engagement with material, technique, and process. Some of his pieces are mechanized (the mechanism usually fully on view), or involve sound.

Hawkinson is renowned for creating complex sculptural systems through surprisingly simple means. His installation “Überorgan”—a stadium-size, fully automated bagpipe—was pieced together from bits of electrical hardware and several miles of inflated plastic sheeting. Hawkinson’s fascination with music and notation can also be seen in “Pentecost,” a work in which the artist tuned cardboard tubes and assembled them in the shape of a giant tree. On this tree the artist placed twelve life-size robotic replicas of himself, and programmed them to beat out hymns at humorously irregular intervals. The source of inspiration for many of Hawkinson’s pieces has been the re-imagining of his own body and what it means to make a self-portrait of this new or fictionalized body. In 1997 the artist created an exacting, two-inch tall skeleton of a bird from his own fingernail parings, and later made a feather and egg from his own hair. Believable even at a close distance, these works reveal Hawkinson’s attention to detail as well as his obsession with life, death, and the passage of time.

In 2015, Hawkinson received a Guggenheim Fellowship for fine arts.

== Exhibitions ==
Hawkinson has exhibited at the Venice Biennale (1999), the Massachusetts Museum of Contemporary Art, (2000), the Power Plant in Toronto, Canada (2000), the Whitney Biennial (2002), and the 2003 Corcoran Biennial in Washington, D.C.

A 2009 exhibition of new works included sculptures crafted from eggshells and a life-sized motorcycle constructed out of feathers. It was on view from May 8 through July 4, 2009 at The Pace Gallery, New York. Wonzimer Gallery in Los Angeles exhibited Hawkinson in the 2020 show "The Shape of Life."

== Permanent collections ==
His 2005 sculpture Bear is a part of the Stuart Collection of public art on the campus of the University of California San Diego.

== Personal life ==
Hawkinson lives in Los Angeles with his wife, artist Patty Wickman.
