= Stuart Collection =

Sculpture collection in San Diego, California

Coordinates: 32.8784°N 117.239720°W

Map of Stuart Collection works on the UC San Diego Central campus (hover over markers for details)

The Stuart Collection is a collection of public art on the campus of the University of California, San Diego. Founded in 1981, the Stuart Collection's goal is to spread commissioned sculpture throughout the campus, including both traditional sculptures and site-specific works integrating with features of the campus such as landscaping and buildings. It is supported by the UC San Diego Department of Visual Arts, the National Endowment for the Arts, and many private organizations and individuals.

The collection was conceived by and named after its initial benefactor, James Stuart DeSilva. The collection was administered by Director Mary L. Beebe until 2021, when she was succeeded by Jessica Berlanga Taylor, the current director. It contains 22 works by 21 internationally recognized artists. The first work added to the collection was Niki de Saint Phalle's Sun God; the most recent addition is Ann Hamilton's KAHNOP • TO TELL A STORY

== Installations ==
#	Year	Name	Artist	Location	Image
1	1983	Sun God	Niki de Saint Phalle	Sun God Lawn, East of Muir and Sixth College	
2	1983	Two Running Violet V Forms	Robert Irwin	Eucalyptus grove behind Faculty Club	
3	1984	La Jolla Project	Richard Fleischner	Revelle College near Theatre District	
4	1986	Trees	Terry Allen	Eucalyptus grove near Geisel Library	
5	1986	Something Pacific	Nam June Paik	Communication/Media Center building	
6	1987	UNDA	Ian Hamilton Finlay	Marshall College north playing field	
7	1988	Vices and Virtues	Bruce Nauman	Powell Structural Systems Laboratory	
8	1988	La Jolla Vista View	William Wegman	La Jolla Playhouse Theatre District	
9	1991	Terrace	Jackie Ferrara	Cellular and Molecular Medicine Facility	
10	1991	Untitled	Michael Asher	Town Square, south of Price Center	
11	1992	Green Table	Jenny Holzer	Muir College quad	
12	1992	Snake Path	Alexis Smith	East of Geisel Library	
13	1996	Red Shoe	Elizabeth Murray	Eucalyptus grove near Torrey Pines Road	
14	1998	Standing	Kiki Smith	School of Medicine campus	
15	2001	READ/WRITE/THINK/DREAM	John Baldessari	Geisel Library	
16	2005	Bear	Tim Hawkinson	Jacobs School of Engineering courtyard	
17	2008	Another	Barbara Kruger	Price Center East	
18	2012	Fallen Star	Do Ho Suh	Jacobs School of Engineering	
19	2017	The Wind Garden	John Luther Adams	La Jolla Playhouse Theatre District	
20	2018	What Hath God Wrought?	Mark Bradford	Revelle College	
21	Created in 1987, Installed in 2021	Same Old Paradise	Alexis Smith	North Torrey Pines Living and Learning Neighborhood (Sixth College) inside of the Jeannie Auditiorium	
22	2023	KAHNOP • TO TELL A STORY	Ann Hamilton (artist)	Rupertus Lane, next to the UC San Diego Central Campus station, and beside the Epstein Family Amphitheater	
