= Price Center =

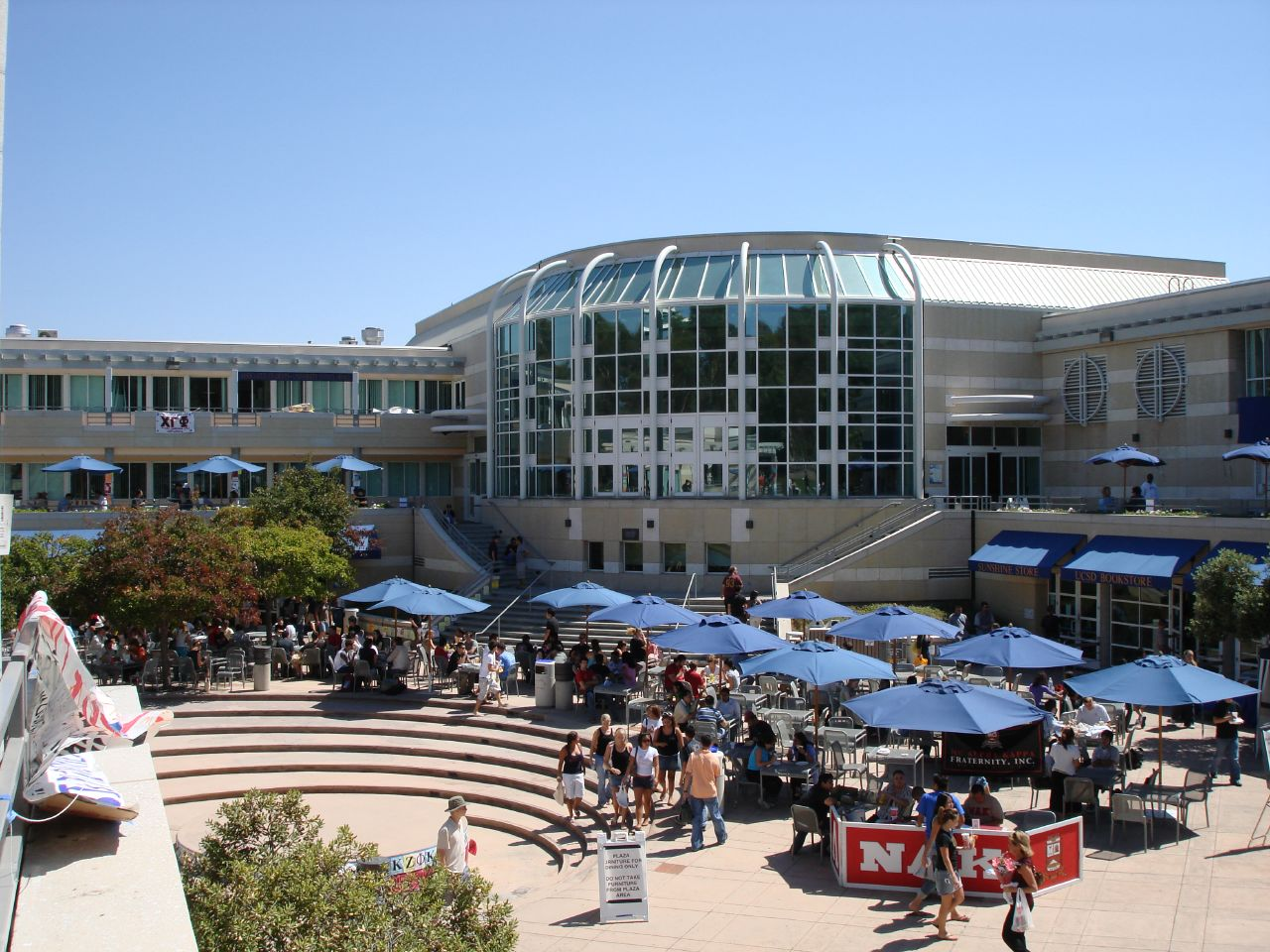
- Price Center West exterior

General information
- Type: Student activity center
- Location: La Jolla, San Diego, California
- Coordinates: 32.880°N 117.237°W
- Opened: 1989
- Renovated: 2003, 2008
- Cost: $19.4 million
- Renovation cost: $66 million
- Owner: University of California San Diego

Technical details
- Floor count: 4
- Floor area: 430,252 sq ft

Design and construction
- Architecture firm: Kaplan McLaughlin Diaz

Renovating team
- Architect: Mehrdad Yazdani
- Renovating firm: Cannon Design

Other information
- Parking: Gilman Parking Structure

Website
- http://universitycenters.ucsd.edu/

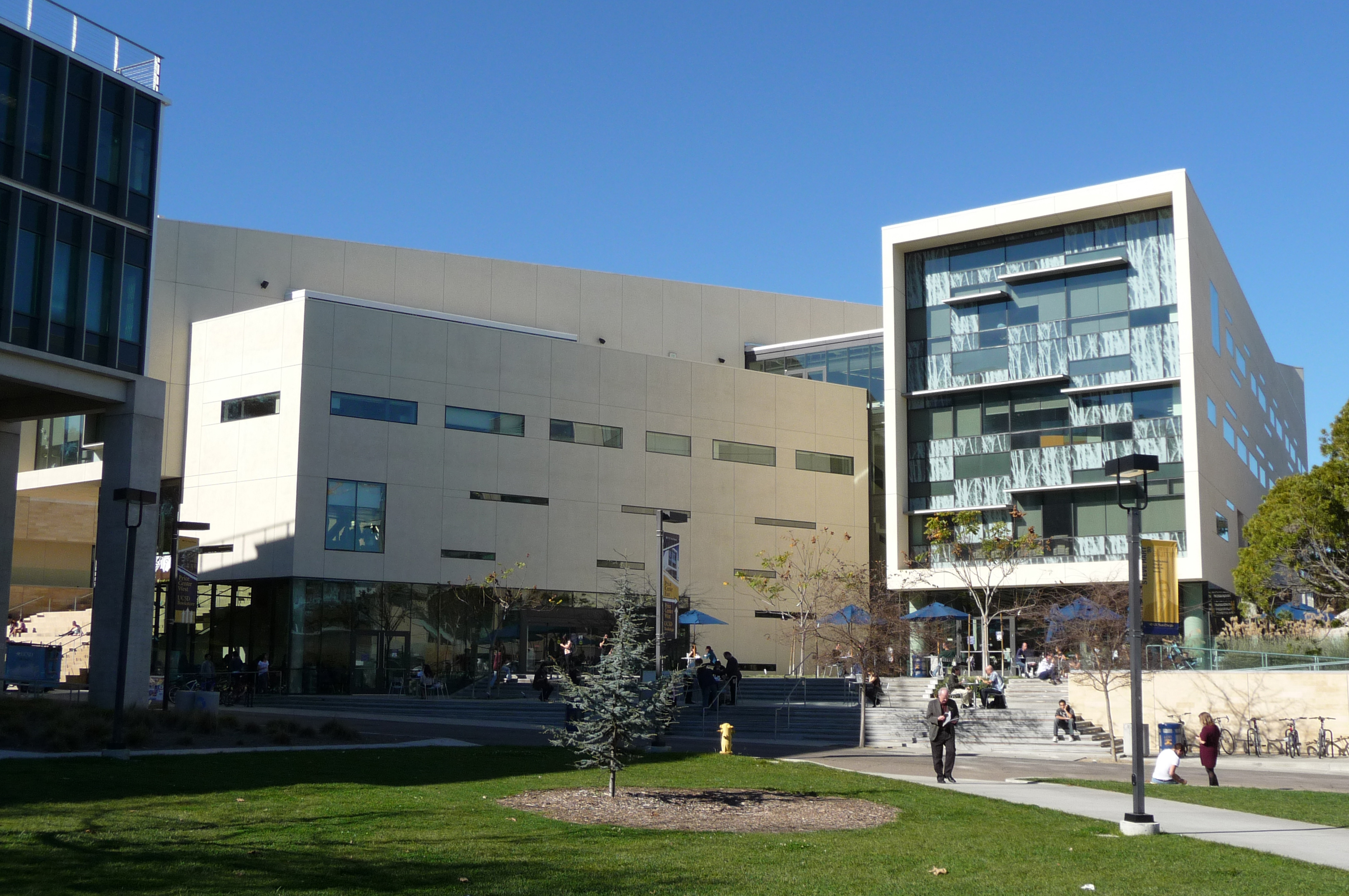
Price Center East's south entrance

Price Center is a student center located in the center of the University of California, San Diego, campus, just south of Geisel Library. As one of the largest student centers in the country, Price Center serves more than 30,000 visitors a day. Price Center offers a variety of services, places, and spaces geared to the needs of students including fast food restaurants, the campus bookstore, a movie theater, and offices for various student organizations.

It is named after retail mogul Sol Price.

== History ==
In the early 1980s, UC San Diego found that its existing Student Center in Muir College was unequipped to handle the more than 12,000 students that were enrolled at the university. As a result, UC San Diego suffered from reduced student involvement and a sense of apathy across campus. Additionally, the lack of on-campus social space contributed to the fact that nearly 60% of UC San Diego students at the time commuted to school. In November 1983, a survey of 2,000 UCSD students indicated a pressing need for a new student union. That same school year, students passed a referendum that raised their student fees from $12.50 per quarter to $37.50 per quarter, for the purpose of constructing a University Center that would house fast food restaurants, a movie theater, and offices for student organizations. The proposed University Center, sited southeast of the existing Central Library, was originally estimated to cost $9 million to construct, but the Kaplan McLaughlin Diaz design approved by the UC Regents would be an $18.6 million facility with an added pub, ballroom, and bookstore.

Construction on the center was initially met with some opposition, as student members of the Committee for Responsible Spending argued that the fee increase was passed due to unethical actions by the Student Center Board. However, construction workers broke ground in the summer of 1986, with completion scheduled for late 1988. In 1987, retail mogul Sol Price donated $2 million to the construction of the center, an act which was then one of the largest donations in university history and resulted in it being named for him. The ribbon-cutting ceremony on April 21, 1989 was interrupted by protestors who called the $19.6 million structure the "High Price Center", but the game room and circular plaza were met with enthusiasm. While the old Student Center remained open, Price Center went on to become the main hub of campus.

=== East expansion ===
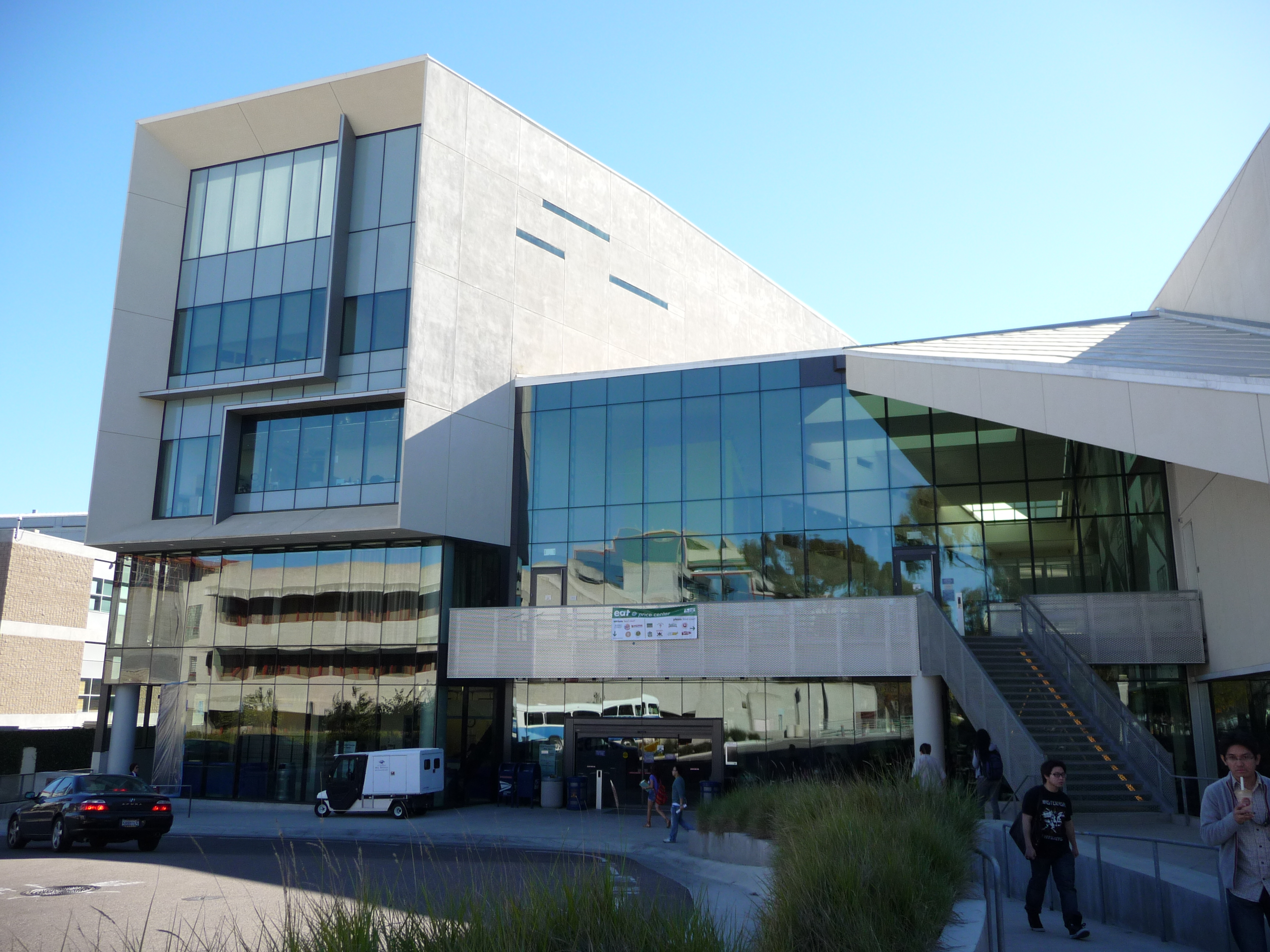
North entrance of Price Center East

By 2002, it was becoming increasingly clear that even Price Center and the Student Center combined would be unable to support UC San Diego's projected enrollment, which was expected to surpass 30,000 students by 2010. A student-initiated task force recommended several renovations to the Student Center, and an expansion of Price Center. The expansion was to be anchored by a 24-hour study lounge surrounded by late-night fast food restaurants, as well as a grocery store, post office, and retail services. In the spring of 2003, students approved a fee increase of $39/quarter to fund the new facility. One of the stipulations of the fee increase was that it would not take place until the facility was constructed and opened. The student fee gathered roughly $46 million for the expansion, with the remainder coming from various campus accounts.

A 2005 report on overall campus satisfaction determined that the Price Center expansion would be best served by focusing on three areas: "building a sense of community on campus, improving the intellectual and social connection between faculty and students and creating a stronger identity for the school by increasing publicity of its accomplishments." The architect for the expansion, Mehrdad Yazdani, was faced with the challenge of integrating the expansion into the existing facility, while redesigning the surrounding area to create an "urban center". The design for Price Center East featured a central four-story atrium which connected to the exterior of the university through a series of plazas and staircases. The adjacent Town Square and shuttle loop, too, were redesigned to create a downtown for UC San Diego students.

The university celebrated the opening of the Price Center East on May 18, 2008. The grand staircase connecting Town Square and the second story opened shortly afterwards.

== Art installations ==
Price Center features one Stuart Collection piece and two other major university art installations. Former UC San Diego faculty member Barbara Kruger's Another is a 74-foot long mural installed upon the completion of the Price Center East expansion in 2008. It is on the western wall of the central atrium. The mural features two clocks that are punctuated with terrazzo-like phrases that begin with the word "ANOTHER". Two LED displays serve as news tickers, scrolling rapidly with current events from an AP stream. The mural integrates with the building through blocks on the atrium floor featuring quotes from well-known artists and scientists.

The south entrances to the building, on the Triton Steps, are flanked by alumnus and sculptor Manuelita Brown's Triton, a 750-pound bronze sculpture that honors the university's mascot, King Triton. It was unveiled on October 13, 2008 by Chancellor Marye Ann Fox. The sculpture had been planned ten years earlier by the graduating classes of 1998 and 1999, as part of an effort to increase campus pride.

On February 11, 2015, Chancellor Pradeep Khosla unveiled the Black Legacy Mural, a 17-by-40-foot mural depicting various African-American leaders smiling behind two African-American children, the grandchildren of artist Andrea Rushing. The mural, located behind Dlush on the first floor of Price Center East, is supplemented by a set of 23 tabletops which highlight the various individuals depicted.

== Arson incident ==
On December 3, 2013, surveillance tapes showed two young women setting two fires on the first and second floors of Price Center. On February 7, 2014, UCSD student Holly Nguyen was arrested on suspicion of setting the fires, and UCSD student Maya Land was arrested shortly thereafter. The two students, who received eight separate charges, were believed to be connected to the Earth Liberation Front, an eco-terrorism group. This was because the fires occurred the same day that the University Centers Advisory Board voted to replace Espresso Roma with Starbucks Coffee, angering campus fair trade activists. Both suspects eventually pleaded guilty to felony reckless endangerment.

== Amenities ==
=== Food and beverage ===
- Price Center West (Plaza food court)
- Price Center East (Atrium food court)

=== Services ===
First floor

- Price Center Theater
- UC San Diego Box Office
- UC San Diego Bookstore and Perks coffee shop
- UC San Diego Postal Center
- Sustainability Resource Center
- The Zone wellness center
- Triton Lounge (computer lab)
- One Button (recording studio)
- Group study rooms
- Commuter kitchen
- Commuter lockers

Second floor

- Outback Adventures surf shop
- Kaplan test prep center
- West ballrooms
- East ballroom
- Dance studio
- Art studio
- Cross-Cultural Center
- Inter-Tribal Resource Center
- Student organization offices
- Meeting rooms
- Study lounges

Third floor

- University Centers administration offices
- The One Stop (student organization resource center)
- Center for Student Involvement
- Center for Communication and Leadership Development
- Student organization offices
- Graphic studio
- Meeting rooms
- Alumni affairs offices
- Event Services offices

Fourth floor

- Meeting rooms
- Senate chambers
- Student leadership offices
- Governance chambers

== Awards ==
Price Center and the Price Center East expansion have won numerous architectural awards, including:

- 2005 - American Institute of Architects (AIA) San Diego: Unbuilt Category Honor Award
- 2005 - Chicago Athenaeum Museum of Architecture and Design: American Architecture Award
- 2009 - American Institute of Architects (AIA) San Diego: Honor Award
- 2011 - Association of College Unions International (ACUI): Facility Design Award
