= Albert P. Pisano =

Mechanical engineering researcher and university administrator

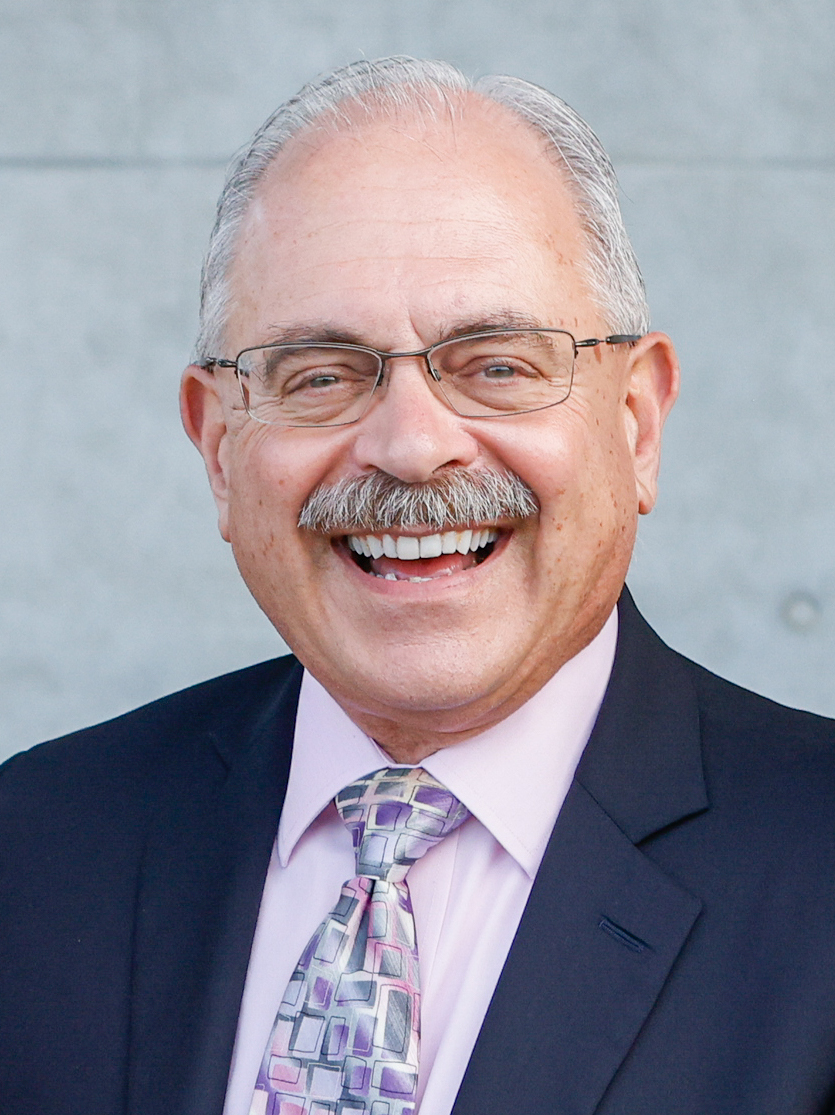

Dean of UC San Diego Jacobs School of Engineering
- Incumbent
- Assumed office September 2013
- Preceded by: Frieder Seible

Personal details
- Education: Columbia University (BS, PhD)
- Occupation: Academic; Administrator
- Website: Albert P. Pisano

Academic work
- Doctoral students: Don L. DeVoe

Albert P. Pisano (born 1954) is an American academic. He serves as dean of the Jacobs School of Engineering at the University of California San Diego (UC San Diego), a position he has held since September 2013. Pisano publishes a monthly Dean's column that introduces the monthly news email from the UC San Diego Jacobs School of Engineering. The January 2022 dean's column, "Math matters to all of us" triggered significant conversation on Pisano's LinkedIn feed.

== Early life ==
Pisano received a BS in mechanical engineering from the School of Engineering and Applied Science at Columbia University in May 1976. He was awarded a Ph.D. in mechanical engineering from Columbia University in May 1981. His Ph.D. Dissertation topic was "The Analytic Development and Experimental Verification of a Model of a High-Speed, Cam-Follower System".

== Career ==
Pisano served on the mechanical engineering faculty of the University of California at Berkeley College of Engineering (UC Berkeley) from 1983 to 2013.

From July 1997 to September 1999, Pisano served as a DARPA (Defense Advanced Research Projects Agency) Program Manager for Microelectromechanical Systems.

== Research ==
Pisano's research largely focused on the invention, design, fabrication, modeling and optimization of microelectromechanical systems (MEMS): harsh environment sensors; micro thermal heat management devices for tiny integrated circuits; micro power generation/harvesting devices; micro resonators for RF communication; micro fluidic systems for nano manufacturing; micro inertial instruments; nanolattice metamaterials; and nanoimprinted sensors and electronics.

== Recognition ==
He was elected to the National Academy of Engineering in 2001 “for contributions to the design, fabrication, commercialization, and educational aspects of microelectromechanical systems (MEMS). He received the Egleston Medal from Columbia University School of Engineering and Applied Science in 2009 for distinguished engineering achievement. He received the IEEE-HKN Asad M. Madni Outstanding Technical Achievement and Excellence Award in 2022. He was recognized "for outstanding technical achievements and seminal contributions that promote engineering to broader communities for the benefit of society."
