= Don DeVoe (academic) =

Engineering faculty in microfluidics

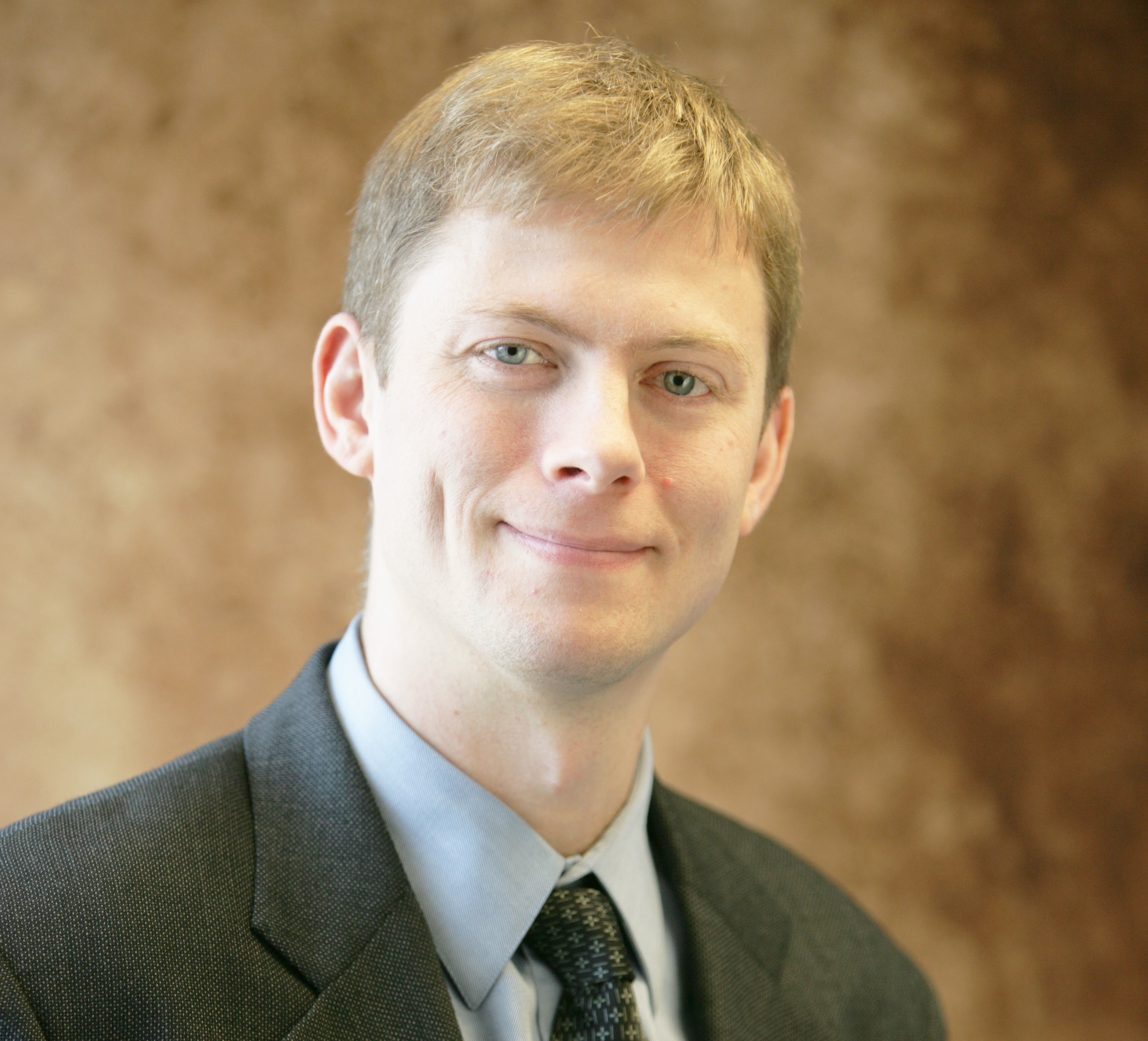
- Born: Donald Lad DeVoe
- Education: University of Maryland, College Park (BS, MS); University of California, Berkeley (PhD)
- Known for: Piezoelectric microsystems, thermoplastic microfluidics, microfluidic-enabled liposome synthesis
- Awards: NSF Presidential Early Career Award for Scientists and Engineers
- Scientific career
- Thesis: Thin film zinc oxide microsensors and microactuators (1997)
- Doctoral advisor: Albert P. Pisano

Donald Lad DeVoe is an engineer recognized for his contributions to the fields of microelectromechanical systems (MEMS) and microfluidics. He is a professor of mechanical engineering at the University of Maryland, College Park, where he serves as associate chair of research and administration in the Department of Mechanical Engineering. He is a Fischell Institute Fellow within the Robert E. Fischell Institute for Biomedical Devices, and holds affiliate faculty appointments in the Fischell Department of Bioengineering and Department of Chemical and Biomolecular Engineering at the University of Maryland.

== Education and career ==
DeVoe received his B.S. and M.S. degrees in mechanical engineering from the University of Maryland, College Park, in 1991 and 1993, respectively. He received his Ph.D. in mechanical engineering from the University of California, Berkeley in 1997 under the guidance of Albert Pisano. He joined the faculty in the Department of Mechanical Engineering at the University of Maryland as an assistant professor in 1997, and received tenure in 2002. He was promoted to full professor in 2008, and has served the department as associate chair of research and administration since 2013. DeVoe co-founded the Center for Micro Engineering at the University of Maryland in 1998, and served as director of the center from 2001 to 2014. In 2000 he co-founded Calibrant Biosystems Inc., a biotechnology company focused on cancer biomarker discovery, and served the company as president until 2007. He was as an associate editor (2006-2012) and senior editor (2012-2023) for the IEEE/ASME Journal of Microelectromechanical Systems (J. MEMS), and has served as a board member (2016-2022) and treasurer (2020-2022) for the Chemical and Biological Microsystems Society.

== Research ==
DeVoe's research lies at the intersection of mechanical engineering, chemical engineering, and bioengineering, with an emphasis on the application of microfabrication and nanofabrication techniques to the development of novel bioanalytical technologies. His research interests include microfluidic platform development for applications in cancer immunology, nanomedicine synthesis, and aerovirology.

== Awards ==
DeVoe was recognized with the Presidential Early Career Award for Scientists and Engineers from the National Science Foundation in 1999 for advances in microsystems technology development and education. He was named a Kavli Fellow of the National Academy of Sciences in 2008, and was awarded the title of Wilson H. Elkins Professor by the University System of Maryland in 2020. He is a recipient of the 2023 University of Maryland Distinguished Scholar-Teacher Award, and the 2013 University System of Maryland Regents Award for Research. He is a Fellow of the Royal Society of Chemistry, and a Fellow of the American Institute for Medical and Biological Engineering
