= Patty Wickman =

American painter

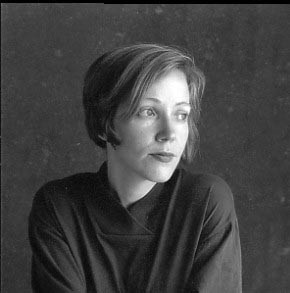
- Photo by Frank Jackson, circa 1996
- Born: 1959 (age 66–67); Pasadena, CA
- Education: Arizona State University, Tempe (BFA), University of Colorado, Boulder (MFA)
- Known for: Painting and Drawing
- Website: https://pattywickman.com/

Patty Wickman (born 1959) is an American contemporary artist who paints representational images that investigate the role of spirituality in contemporary life. She is a professor emeritus of Painting and Drawing at the University of California, Los Angeles, where she taught from 1985 to 2024. Lives and works in Los Angeles, California.

== Biography ==
Patty Wickman was born in Pasadena, California in 1959. She received her Bachelors of Fine Art (BFA) from Arizona State University, Tempe in 1981 and her Master of Fine Art (MFA) from the University of Colorado, Boulder in 1983.

From a young age, Wickman was interested in human anatomy. Her brother was a doctor, and she was interested in becoming a medical illustrator. She instead decided to pursue fine art, mainly focusing on the human figure. Although she felt that figurative art was irrelevant to the art movement during this time, she expressed her desire to capture the spiritual aspect of existence through the figure.

Patty Wickman is a practicing Catholic, and has stated that the academic and commercial art world has been less accepting of religious artists.

== Work ==
Wickman paints representational images that investigate the role of spirituality in contemporary life. Intellectually complex and rigorous, her metaphorical images are layered with symbolism and allegorical implications. Wickman's work ranges from still lifes to domestic suburban scenes. Some of her paintings include figures and imply non-linear narratives. Her painting process involves the research of biblical literature and literary devices, art historical sources, and contemporary cultural references. She uses observation, found images, and staged photographs as visual references. At times her paintings leave preliminary drawings or underpaintings exposed. Some areas of the paintings are fully rendered and densely built up, while other passages are more loosely described. In a recurring Lenten practice, Wickman has made daily paintings of ordinary subjects and experiences. This meditative process is a spiritual act for Wickman during a time of religious contemplation. Wickman's work explores the intersection of the natural and the supernatural, the epic and the everyday, and collapses the distance between vision and visionary.

Patty Wickman’s paintings have been exhibited throughout the United States and internationally. She has lectured and instructed in various institutions in California, Arizona, Wisconsin, Illinois, Colorado, Arizona, New Mexico, Minnesota, and Idaho.

== Exhibitions ==
Wickman's work has been shown at museums, galleries, and non-profit spaces including Lora Schlesinger Gallery, Santa Monica, CA; Cal State LA Fine Arts Gallery, Los Angeles; Cathedral of Our Lady of the Angels, Los Angeles; New York Center for Art and Media Studies, New York; San Jose Museum of Art, San Jose, CA; Academy of Fine Art, Brescia, Italy; Cornell DeWitt Gallery, New York; W139, Amsterdam; Dan Bernier Gallery, Santa Monica; ACME Gallery, Los Angeles; Frye Art Museum, Seattle; Rosamund Felsen Gallery, Santa Monica; Los Angeles Contemporary Exhibitions, Los Angeles; Hunter Museum of Art, Tennessee; Denver Art Museum, Denver, CO; Peter Miller Gallery, Chicago; and Wonzimer Gallery, Los Angeles.
