= Earl Warren College =

Fourth college at UC San Diego

- University of California, San Diego
- Coordinates: 32.882464°N 117.233446°W
- Motto: "Toward a life in balance"
- Established: 1974 (Fourth)
- Namesake: Earl Warren
- Former names: Fourth College
- Status: Undergraduate, liberal arts
- Colors: Warren Maroon
- Provost: Marisa Abrajano
- Deans: Dean of Student Affairs James C. Smith Dean of Academic Advising Jacob Lacy Director of Warren Writing Jeff Gagnon
- Undergraduates: 4,624 (14.7% of UCSD campus population as of 2024)
- Core course: Warren Writing (WCWP) Ethics & Society
- Major events: Festival: Warren Live! Semi-formal Winter Warrenland
- Website: warren.ucsd.edu

Earl Warren College is one of eight undergraduate residential colleges at the University of California, San Diego.

Warren College has one of the largest student populations at UC San Diego, with over 4,500 undergraduate students, comprising about one seventh of the student population. It is named for former California governor and chief justice Earl Warren. Warren College was founded in 1974 in as Fourth College, and later moved to its present location, located near the canyon, with nearby Hopkins Parking Structure to the west on the other side of the canyon. Voigt Drive runs through the Warren College campus and connects to Hopkins Drive on the other side of the canyon, to the west. Since fall 2020, Warren College is the only college not located on Ridge Walk, which overlooks the coastline, when Sixth College moved for second time from its former location in Pepper Canyon (now partially demolished and the site of transfer student housing) to its new home in the North Torrey Pines Living and Learning Neighborhood (NTPLLN) on Ridge Walk built on former Muir Parkings Lots (P207 and P208) directly north of Muir College.

== Residence halls and apartments ==
Residence halls in Warren College

Each of the residence halls within Warren College is named after justices that sat on the U.S. Supreme Court along with Chief Justice Warren. Residence halls are located near the ecological reserve, a canyon filled with eucalyptus trees and hiking trails.

Residence Halls:

- Stewart
- Frankfurter
- Harlan

Apartments (for both first and second year students):

- Black
- Brennan
- Douglas
- Goldberg

Graduate student apartments are also available on the Warren College Campus.

== Academic and Other Facilities ==
Warren College hosts a variety of academic buildings, lecture halls, departmental buildings (which include classrooms, labs, offices, etc.), and other facilities, particularly for engineering and some STEM-focused departments.

The Canyon Vista Marketplace and dining hall, operated by UC San Diego's Housing Dining Hospitality (HDH), serves the Warren College area and is likely named as such due to its own location overlooking the canyon as well as the fact that Warren's location as a whole is near the canyon. Canyon Vista consists of a dining-operated market, as well as food service stations including a grill called Fusion Grill, Three-Sixty, Fresh, and a coffee bar named Earl's Coffeehouse, and according to the HDH website, mobile ordering app, as well as signage and promotional materials located in the dining hall, is the only dining hall on the UC San Diego campus that is certified for and serves halal food, such as halal chicken, on campus.

The former logo of Warren College, with old fonts

The Warren College campus is also home to an enormous rock sculpture in the shape of a bear, officially named Bear by Tim Hawkinson, which was completed in 2005 and is more commonly and unofficially known as "Bearl," which is wordplay combining he words "Bear" and "Earl," located on the engineering quad, and is part of the Stuart Collection. Warren is also home to another Stuart Collection art piece, Fallen Star (completed 2012), a slanted house on top of a building, designed by Do Ho Suh, a Korean immigrant describing the immigrant experience which is oftentimes disorienting, located on the roof of the Engineering Building also known as Jacobs Hall and is accessible from the 8th and top floor, facing in the direction of Warren Mall.

== Student life and involvement ==
Warren College has various student committees, including Warren College Student Council (WCSC), Warren College Events Board (E-Board), Warren Transfer and Commuter Commission (WTCC), Commission on Warren Spirit (COWS), Frosh Small Group, Provost's Student Advisory Council (PSAC), Warren College Honors Council, Warren Initiative for Student Health (WISH), and Warren Association of Volunteer Enthusiasts (WAVE).

== Academic Programs and Requirements ==
=== Programs of Concentration ===
All courses are organized into three disciplines, (1) math/physical sciences, (2) social sciences, and (3) the humanities. Warren College allows students to pursue a major of their choice in any discipline while requiring the completion of two Programs of Concentration (PofCs) in the other two disciplines. Each Program of Concentration is composed of six courses, of 4-units, (e.g., a history major could take six classes in political science and six classes in biology as well).

=== Engineering students ===
Student looking towards an engineering, B.S. degree, however, are required to complete two area studies (A/S), each comprising three courses of 4 units, at least two of which must be upper-division courses. Similar to PofCs, area studies must be non-contiguous to the student's major and to each other.

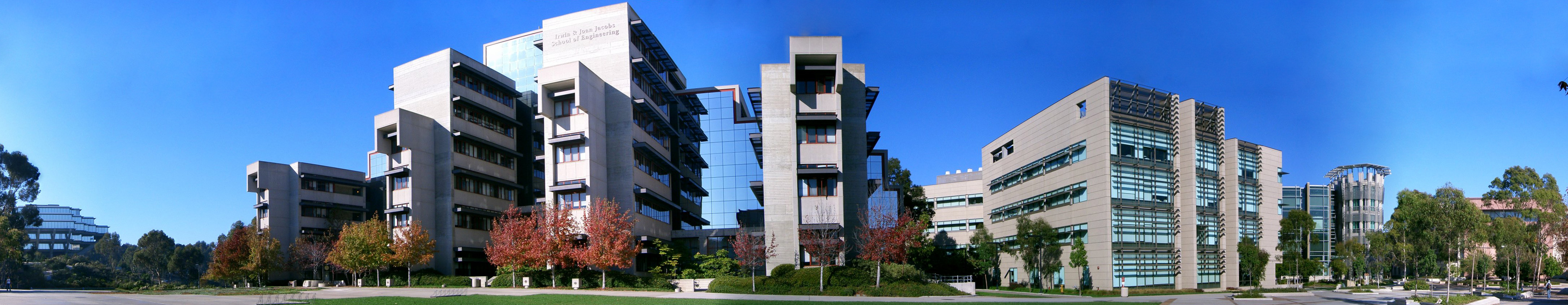
Panorama of Warren Mall, containing the major engineering buildings at UC San Diego.

Warren College is home to a large number of engineering students because its general education requirements are more flexible for students pursuing an undergraduate degree in engineering. Additionally, many engineering departments have facilities located in or near Warren College. However, regardless, as students can choose to major in any program or department, provided they are eligible (e.g. a non-capped major or qualifies for a capped major), regardless of their college of registration, despite students' college choice rankings and preferences on their applications, it is not guaranteed that engineering students will be automatically assigned to Warren.

In 2006, the college has added a new building dedicated to the study of Information Technology, called Calit2, known as Qualcomm Institute (QI) at its UC San Diego branch.

=== Writing program ===
Warren Collège's writing program, conspicuity known as Warren College Writing Program (WCWP) (or unofficially, simply "Warren Writing" or "Warren Writing Program" for short), consists of a two-quarter sequence for students who entered as a first-year and a one-quarter course for transfer students (who, in most cases, have already taken their English language requirements at their previous institutions as a UC application requirement), based on the model of argumentation developed by British philosopher Stephen Toulmin.
