= SGF =

SGF may mean:

- Save Goa Front, a 2007–2008 regional political party in Goa, India
- Smart Game Format, a computer file format
- Société générale de financement, Québeca, Canada
- South Glens Falls, a village in upstate New York
- Sovereign Grace Fellowship of Canada, for Baptist churches
- Springfield–Branson National Airport, Springfield, Missouri, US, IATA code
- Sun God Festival, a yearly music festival hosted at the University of California San Diego
- The Spaceguard Foundation, to protect Earth from collisions with astronomical objects
- Summer Game Fest, video game event
