= Tyrolean Terrace Colony =

Historic hotel in La Jolla, California

Coordinates: 32°50′56″N 117°16′14″W

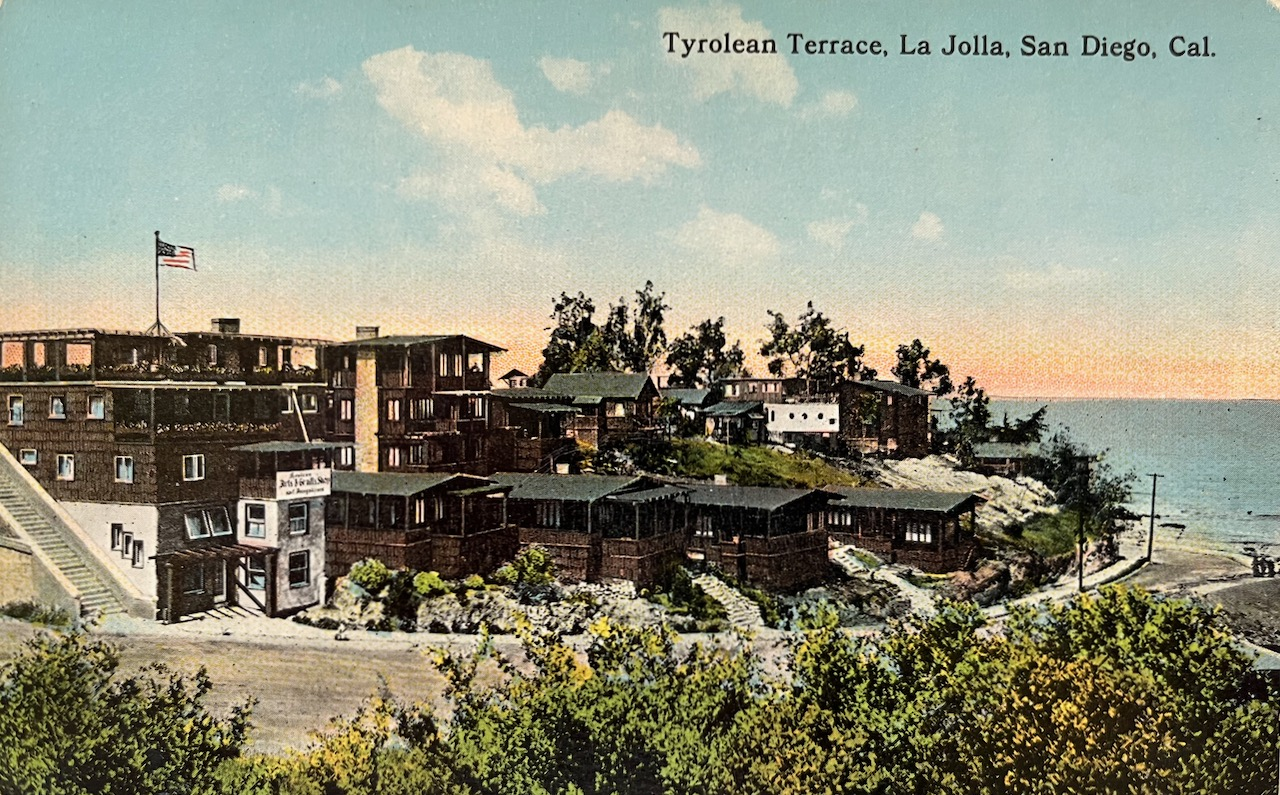
Tyrolean Terrace, La Jolla, CA, ca. 1915

The Tyrolean Terrace Colony (1911–1912) was an Arts & Crafts-style hotel bungalow court in La Jolla, a community of San Diego, California, adjacent to the former Green Dragon Colony. It catered to early automobile traffic along Coast Blvd., a scenic drive that led to La Jolla Park and other sites along the shore.

The property, but not the buildings, was listed as a San Diego Historical Landmark in 1975 (HRBS 102).

The Village Stairway to Goldfish Point and Caves, leading from Prospect St. to Coast Blvd., is located on the former site of the Colony.

== History ==
The Tyrolean Terrace Colony consisted of eight small chalets with names that evoked Switzerland, such as “Lucerne,” “Matterhorn,” and “Geneva.” Fully furnished, they were modern structures for their day, with plumbing, gas, and electricity.

The colony was developed in 1911 by John W. and Frances E. Schroeder who had managed Anna Held's Green Dragon Colony. It was designed by Phillips G. Dexter (1884–1950). The development capitalized on a boom in early automobile tourism in Southern California. In 1908, La Jolla's Coast Boulevard, a scenic road overlooking La Jolla Cove, was graded and paved to allow automobiles to access the coast.

The cottages were staged irregularly on a steep slope and connected by rock- and flower-bordered paths and flights of steps. Each chalet had a veranda overlooking the water. Large concrete steps, now the Village Stairway to Goldfish Point and Caves, were constructed in 1912 to connect Prospect St. with Coast Blvd.

The Tyrolean Arts & Crafts Shop, located at the top of the hill facing Prospect St., operated as a gift shop and tearoom. It sold handcrafted jewelry, copper art crafts, pottery, and textiles. In 1923, it became the Tyrolean Tea Shop and, later, hosted a series of other restaurants.

The Schroeders ran the colony until 1926 when they sold the property. The chalets served as residential and rental properties between 1926 and 1975. During World War II, they hosted many servicemen operating out of Camp Callan. Among the former tenants were architects Thomas L. Shepherd and Sim Bruce Richards.

In 1968, entrepreneur Bob Sinclair opened Pannikin Coffee & Tea in the former Tyrolean Arts & Crafts Shop.

== Architecture ==
The Tyrolean Terrace Colony was designed by Phillips G. Dexter (1884–1950) who also created a unique Japanese-style residence in La Jolla. Little is known about his career.

The colony, built in the Swiss-chalet style, referenced the Arts & Crafts bungalows of the San Francisco Bay Area. Architect Bernard Maybeck, among others, developed many Swiss chalet-style homes around 1900. Build of old-growth redwood, the chalet style incorporated verandas and balconies that “seemed tailor-made for Berkeley hillsides.” Pasadena architects Charles and Henry Greene adapted the chalet style to the California bungalow.

The Tyrolean Terrace Colony's location on a steep hillside overlooking La Jolla's sea caves must have made the Swiss chalet seem like an appropriate style. The reference to Switzerland, at that time the site of many sanatoriums, also may have signaled the health-giving effects of the Southern California climate.

Architect Eugene Ray argued that The Tyrolean Terrace Colony—a hotel with detached bungalows—influenced the development of the motor hotel. He also noted that the chalet's terraces were features later adopted by architect Rudolph Schindler for his El Pueblo Ribera Apartments (1923) in La Jolla.

== Historic preservation ==
The Tyrolean Terrace Colony, like other historic sites in La Jolla, was the focus of heated debates over historic preservation and personal property rights. Commercial development was opposed by a local preservation group, Citizens Opposed to Violations of the Environment (C.O.V.E), headed by architect Tony Ciani, that simultaneously fought to save the Red Rest and Red Roost Cottages.

In 1975, the site (but not its buildings) was listed as a San Diego Historical Landmark (HRBS 102) but this did not prevent the chalets from being demolished that same year and replaced with Coast Walk Shopping Center. The new development, modest in scale, was praised by many residents who felt that it was in keeping with the architectural character of the former site.

In 2019, a new development was built on the site of the former chalets: three luxury townhouses in the Arts & Crafts-style designed by Alcorn & Benton Architects.

== See also ==
- Google Arts & Culture: La Jolla's Coastal Legacy
