= Sun God Festival =

Annual concert event at the University of California, San Diego

- 2025 Sun God Festival wordmark
- Frequency: annually
- Location: RIMAC Field at UC San Diego
- Years active: 1983 – Present
- Founders: AS Concerts & Events, UC San Diego
- Most recent: May 3, 2025; 18 months ago
- Next event: TBA
- Budget: $1,022,200 (2024-25)
- Website: sgf.ucsd.edu

The Sun God Festival is an annual campus festival at the University of California, San Diego. Its name references Sun God, an on-campus statue by French artist Niki de Saint Phalle. The festival takes place every spring quarter. The main stage is traditionally opened by the winner of the Battle of the Bands, a competition that UC San Diego student musicians perform in leading up to the festival.

The festival is produced by the AS Concerts & Events office and paid for by the student body activity fee. It has featured a vast variety of entertainment elements since its inception, including a cross-campus fair, lounge areas, and multiple stages which have featured art performances, live comedy, student talent, DJ sets, and a mix of underground and commercially successful musical performers.

== History ==
The first Sun God Festival coincided with the one-year anniversary of Sun God's arrival in 1984. The festival's original location was adjacent to the statue, but it has since grown and moved numerous times, from Price Center to the now-demolished Mile High Field, eventually finding a more permanent home at its current location on RIMAC field.

During spring quarter of 2016, the Associated Students of UC San Diego ran a fee referendum to increase the student activity fee, which is the primary source of funding for the event. The new funding was meant to replace the festival's guest ticket revenue, which was lost when guests presented increased liabilities to student safety at the event. The student body overwhelmingly supported this fee increase in order to preserve the festival's tradition, passing the referendum by a margin of nearly 40 percent.

In 2018, Associated Students replaced the headlining act, Blackbear, with Roy Woods, when blackbear cancelled on account of a series of pancreatic attacks. In 2020, the Sun God Festival was among the many public events cancelled due to the COVID-19 pandemic, over concerns that the virus could spread quickly at large gatherings such as concerts.

In 2025, the EDM artist Wooli was originally set to be the headliner for Sun God Festival. Several days before the event was set to take place, the artist dropped out of the event and any mention of him attending was removed from the Sun God Festival website. AS Concerts & Events confirmed on Instagram that he would not be headlining for "unforeseen circumstances", but students strongly speculated it was due to the student population being visibly upset and very vocal at the disappointment of the choice of headliner.

Many members of campus, including police, administrators, student planners, and university staff work throughout the year to support the event, as it presents unique challenges due to its scale and culture. In recent years, the festival has often been used as a platform to promote safety initiatives, such as bystander intervention peer workshops, alcohol and drug education, and sexual assault awareness.

== Controversies ==
=== Alcohol and Drug Abuse Hospitalizations ===
Due to the number of students who were being hospitalized from alcohol and drug abuse at the festival, including a "handful" of attendees experiencing "near death" hospitalizations in 2013, students and administrators opted to eliminate guest tickets and increase safety measures, such as the implementation of on-site medical care to reduce the amount of hospitalizations. These changes saw a decrease in hospitalizations from 48 to 8 from 2013 to 2014.

In 2014, a student who attended Sun God Festival was found dead in his dormitory after the event. The autopsy revealed that the death was caused by an overdose of the drug 5-APB. This death caused further security measures to be implemented, such as pat-downs for attendees.

In 2015, alcohol usage at the festival increased by 45 percent. The increased security measures and loss of guest ticket revenues have also been a severe detriment to the event budget, which affected future lineups. Additionally, since 2019, students living on-campus are not allowed to house guests during the weekend of Sun God Festival, and non-affiliates are not allowed in residential areas.

=== 2024 Festival Cancellation ===
In 2024, the Sun God Festival was set to take place on Saturday, May 4, 2024, but was ultimately announced to be cancelled two days prior with the reason cited as security concerns caused by the 2024 pro-Palestinian protests on campus. However, numerous Associated Students members at the time expressed concerns with the cited reason, claiming the cancellation was made in retaliation by the university and a deliberate attempt to pit students against one another.

=== AS Concerts & Events Backlash ===
In 2022, Associated Students Concerts & Events received significant amounts of backlash over the choice of headliners not being representative of student interests. In 2023, AS Concerts & Events responded to the concerns by creating a video responding to falsified comments. After backlash, the video was deleted from their social media a day later.

== Lineup ==
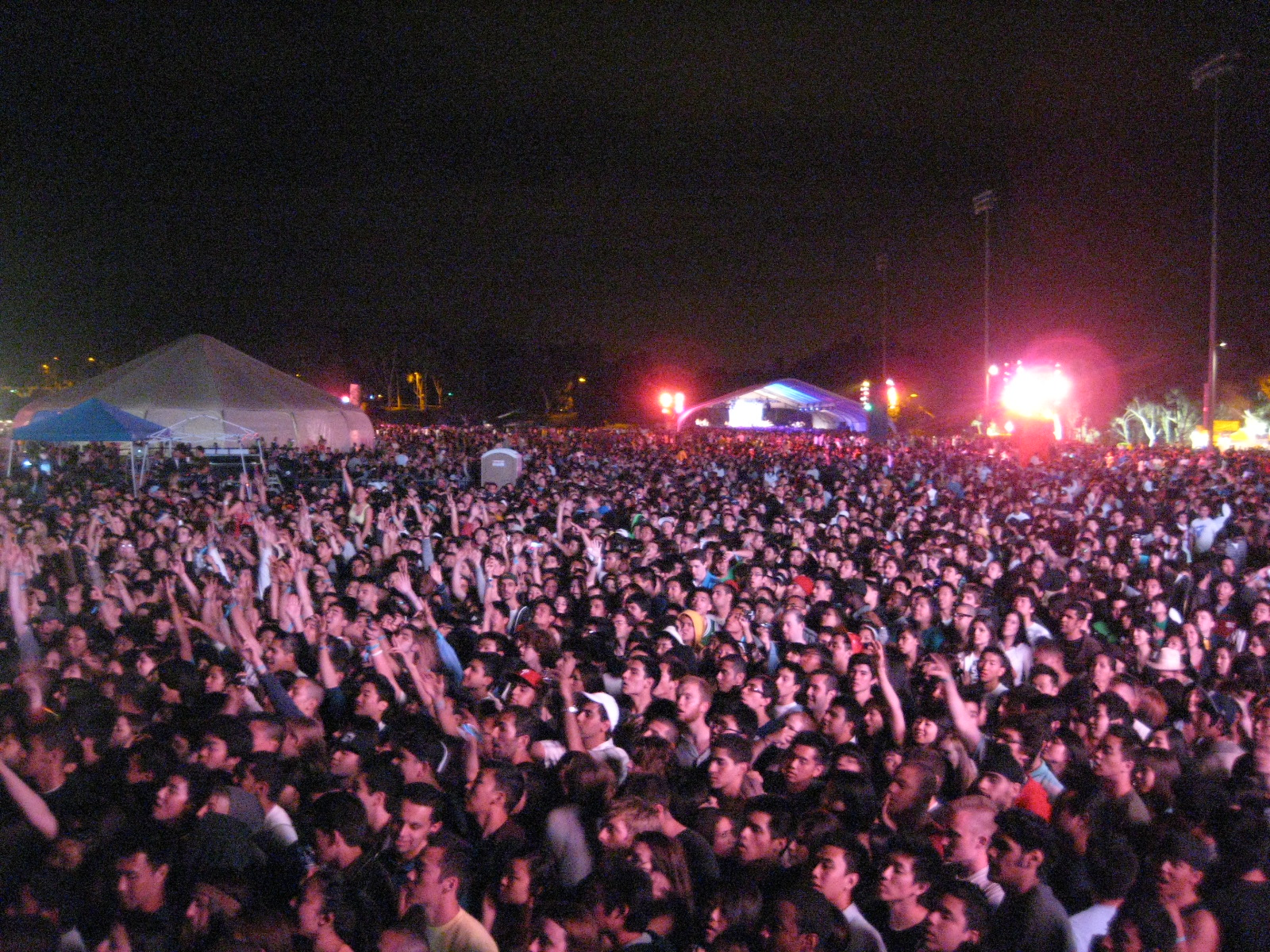
2009 Sun God Festival - view from Main Stage

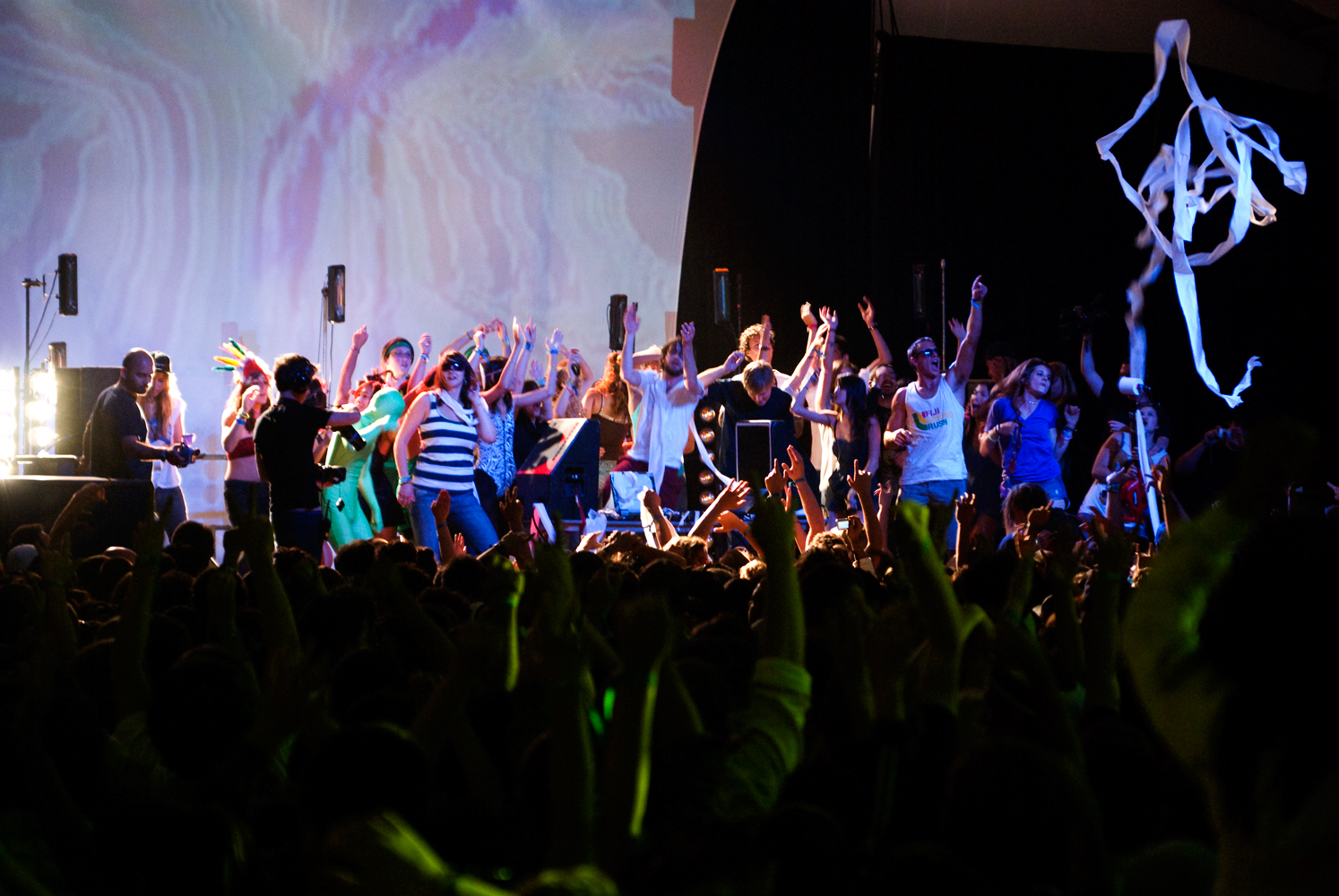
2009 Sun God Festival - Girl Talk headlining the Dance Tent

=== Festival Lineups ===
- 1983 – Sparks
- 1985 – Los Lobos
- 1990 – The Call
- 1991 – The Beat Farmers, Untouchables
- 1992 – Blur, Senseless Things, Food for Fleet, Flatten Manhattan
- 1993 – Blues Traveler, Gin Blossoms, Blacksmith Union
- 1994 – They Might Be Giants, No Doubt, Frente!, Brian Dewan
- 1995 – The Pharcyde, 311, B-Side Players, DJ Greyboy, Oversoul
- 1996 – Rocket from the Crypt, Souls of Mischief, Buck-O-Nine
- 1997 – De La Soul, Save Ferris, Clyde's Ride, Switchfoot, DJ DIEM
- 1998 – Social Distortion, the Roots, d.f. Rost
- 1999 – Cypress Hill, Reel Big Fish, Black Eyed Peas
- 2000 – Dishwalla, Rahzel, the Aquabats, F.o.N.
- 2001 – Naughty by Nature, Face to Face, Xzibit
- 2002 – Cake, No Use for a Name
- 2003 – Mos Def, Bad Religion, Kinky, White Starr, Maxeen
- 2004 – Busta Rhymes, Goldfinger, the Dandy Warhols, Stellastarr, Moving Units, the Bronx
- 2005 – Ludacris, Phantom Planet, Damian Marley with Stephen Marley, Pretty Girls Make Graves, the Walkmen, Rufio
- 2006 – My Chemical Romance, Cypress Hill, Talib Kweli, No Use for a Name, Bedouin Soundclash, Ozma, Boy Sets Fire, the Fully Down, Versus the Mirror
- 2007 – T.I., Ozomatli, Third Eye Blind, Ben Kweller, Fifty on Their Heels, High Tide, Busdriver, Self Against City, Meho Plaza
- 2008 – Coheed and Cambria, Sean Kingston, Matt Costa, Say Anything, Living Legends, Richard Vission, the Aquabats, Little Brother, Sleepercar, Lady Dottie & the Diamonds, the Muslims, DJ Artistic, the Drowning Men, the Modlins, Bill Magee Blues Band, Radio Racer, Neon Trees, the Frantic Romantic, Masterpiece
- 2009 – N.E.R.D., Iron & Wine, Girl Talk, Motion City Soundtrack, Sara Bareilles, Augustana, the Cool Kids, Grand Ole Party, Rootbeer, DJ Nu-Mark, Nosaj Thing, Anavan; Nooners: Iglu & Hartly, Rob Crow, Dear and the Headlights, Lady Dottie & the Diamonds, the Shys, the Pheromones, Crash Kings, Wizard Wolves
- 2010 – Drake, Michelle Branch, Z-Trip, Relient K, Thrice, B.o.B, Crash Kings, the Parson Red Heads, Designer Drugs, Skeet Skeet, Robbed by Robots
- 2011 – Wiz Khalifa, Jimmy Eat World, Mike Posner, Crystal Castles, JFK of MSTRKRFT, Best Coast, Big Sean, LA Riots, Kill the Noise, Ocelot
- 2012 – Silversun Pickups, Paul van Dyk, Chiddy Bang, Ra Ra Riot, Macklemore & Ryan Lewis, Tommy Trash, Dia Frampton, Murs, Tokimonsta, Clockwork, Oliver, Yacek
- 2013 – Kendrick Lamar, Porter Robinson, Portugal. The Man, Andrew McMahon, Danny Brown, Adrian Lux, Youngblood Hawke, RAC, DJ Geo-D, IndO
- 2014 – Diplo, Young the Giant, Juicy J, New Politics, the Colourist, Joey Badass, Ty Dolla Sign, Audien, Torro Torro, 2ToneDisco, Jhameel
- 2015 – Snoop Dogg, Strfkr, Jhené Aiko, OK Go, Mike Czech, DJ Demon
- 2016 – Miguel, Nico & Vinz, Louis the Child, Great Good Fine Ok, Paradise
- 2017 – Schoolboy Q, DJ Mustard, Bad Suns, Khalid, Manila Killa, Mild High Club, Kinjaz, 220 Second to None, Choreo Cookies, Mark Johns
- 2018 – Roy Woods, MadeinTYO, Sir Sly, Cuco, Robotaki, Ashe, Temporex, Sorah Yang, the GOOD Project, Choreo Cookies, Femme Fatale, 220 Second to None, Stay for the Fireworks. Original headliner Blackbear canceled due to medical emergency
- 2019 – Vince Staples, Joji, Hayley Kiyoko, Whipped Cream, Hunny
- 2022 – Iann Dior, Keshi, Umi, Peach Tree Rascals, Berhana
- 2023 – Smino, Knock2, Dayglow, Khai Dreams, Boys World, Podcast But Outside
- 2025 – Disco Lines (replaced Wooli), Duckwrth, Slayyyter, Sun Room, The Arkangels
- 2026 – Dominic Fike, Mike Sherm, Mico, Juelz, Reverie

=== Cancelled Events ===
- 2020 – Festival cancelled due to COVID-19
- 2021 – Festival cancelled due to COVID-19, replaced by Sunny Days Virtual Festival: Gryffin, Omar Apollo, Eric Nam, Chloe x Halle, Aubrey Plaza, Hasan Minhaj
- 2024 – Festival cancelled in response to the 2024 university pro-Palestinian demonstrations, originally: JPEGMafia, Fousheé, William Black, Grentperez, Frex
