= Green Dragon Colony site =

Historic art colony

Coordinates: 32°50′58″N 117°16′6″W

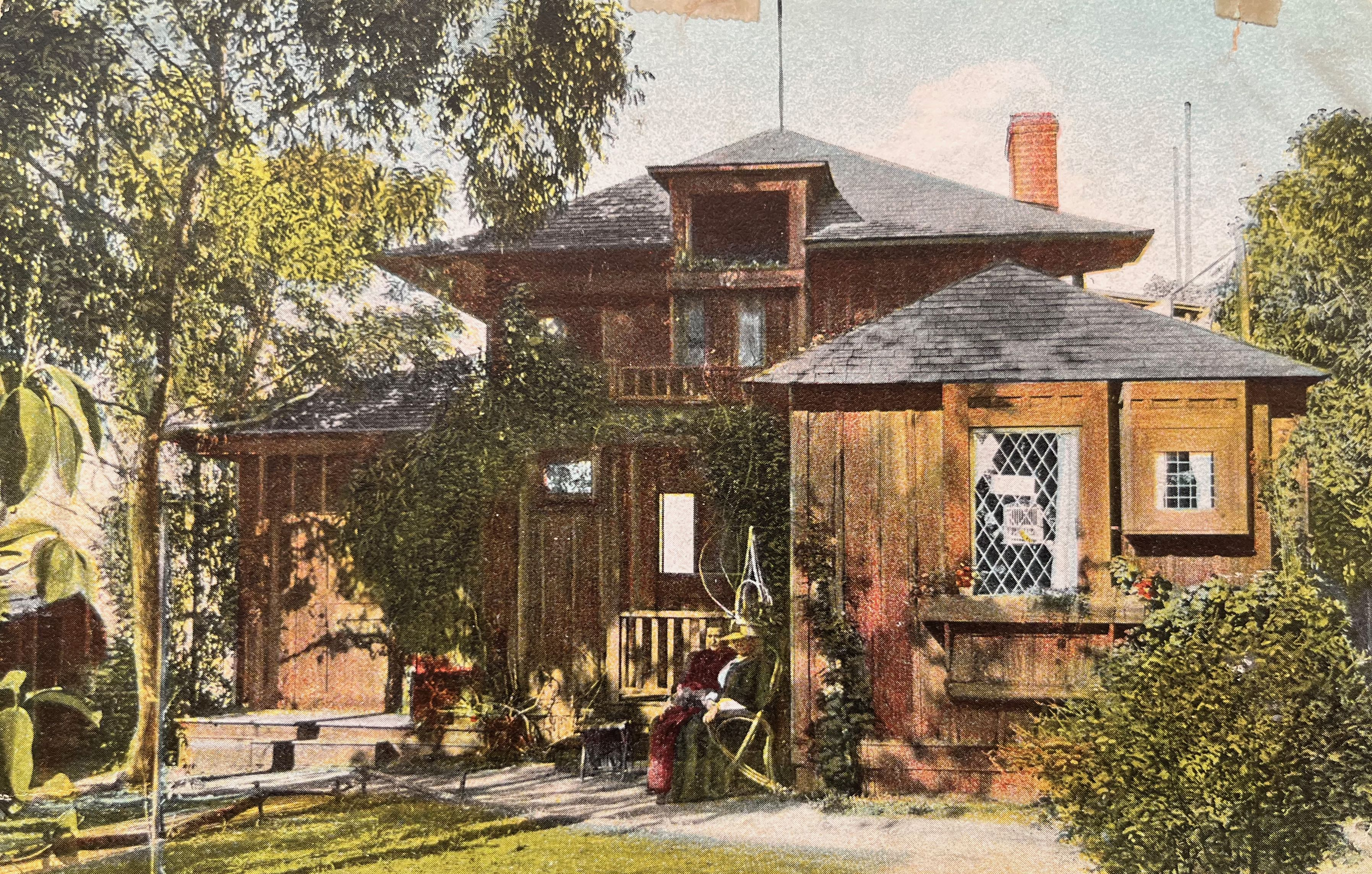
Postcard, 1911, showing Anna Held's home, The Green Dragon

The Green Dragon Colony was a group of unique rental cottages that attracted musicians and artists to the seaside community of La Jolla in San Diego, California, between 1895 and 1912. Established by German immigrant Anna Held Heinrich, the colony became a well-known tourist destination in Southern California.

The site of the Green Dragon Colony was listed as a San Diego Historical Landmark in 1973 (HRBS 84).

== Location ==
The Green Dragon Colony, 1258-1274 Prospect St., was located above La Jolla Cove with views of the Pacific Ocean, La Jolla Bay, and distant cliffs extending north along the shore. A scenic outlook, open to the public, is located west of Eddie V's restaurant.

== History ==
In the mid-1880s, the anticipated arrival of the Southern Pacific and Santa Fe Railroads led to a real estate boom along the Southern California Coast. La Jolla, a remote area best known for its natural scenery, was targeted by developers for the construction of tourist facilities and residential housing.

With the arrival of the San Diego, Pacific Beach, and La Jolla Railroad in 1894, La Jolla became a popular tourist destination that attracted visitors from the East, particularly during the winter months. Approximately one hundred homes were built between 1887 and 1900, most of them with names rather than street numbers. The population increased from zero in 1887 to 350 in 1900.

=== 1894-1912 ===
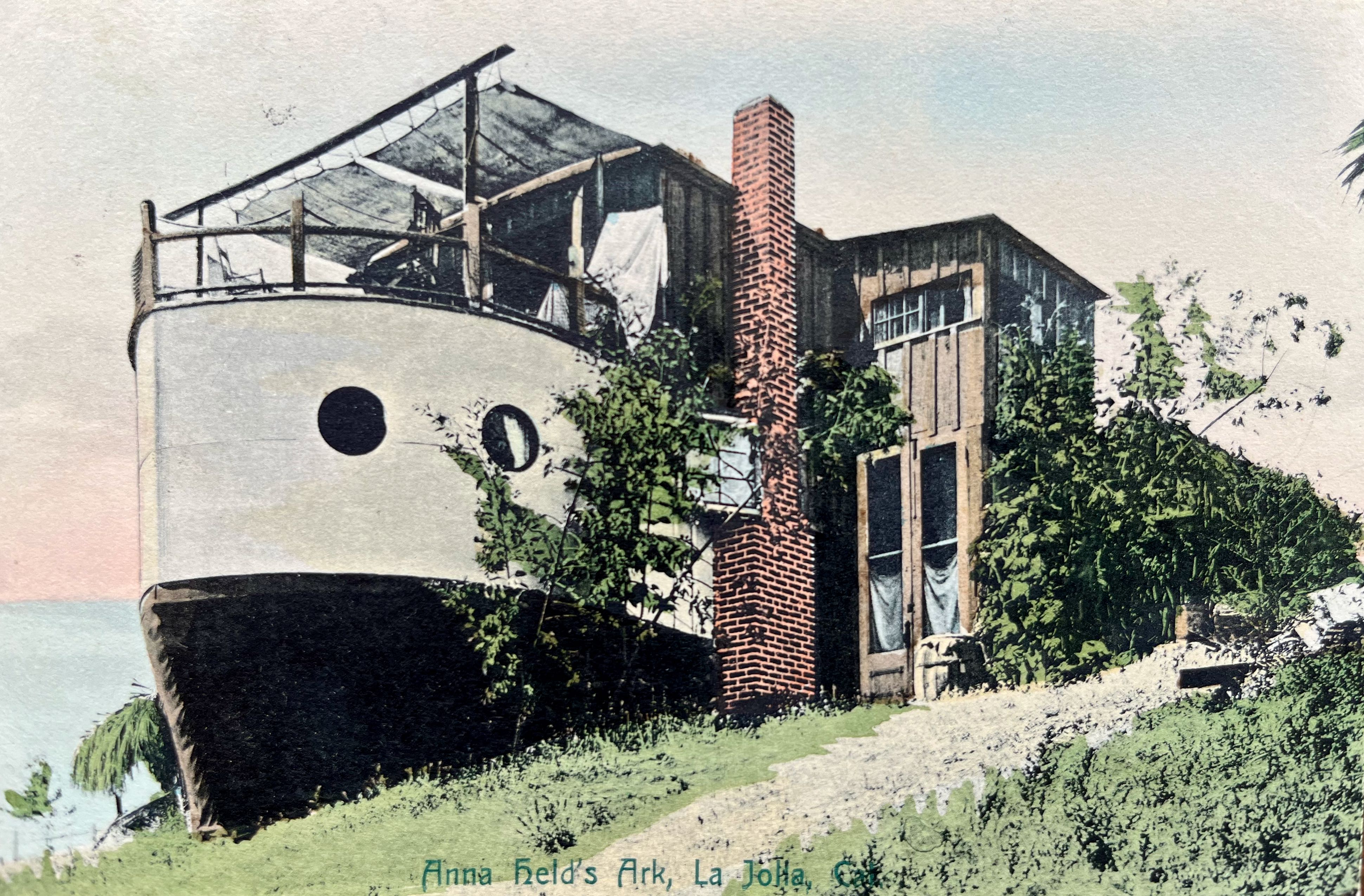
Postcard, 1912, showing "The Ark," a unique cottage in the Green Dragon Colony

The Green Dragon Colony started with a tiny, Arts and Crafts-inspired cottage, The Green Dragon (1894), built for Anna Held (1849–1941). A German immigrant, Held worked as a governess for the family of Ulysses S. Grant Jr. The cottage, designed by Irving J. Gill, showed signatures of the architect's trademark style.

Held befriended many of the leading theatrical and musical talents of the day, including British actress Ellen Terry, actress Helena Modjeska, composers Ignacy Jan Paderewski and Charles Wakefield Cadman, and music critic William L. Hubbard.

The Green Dragon was both a weekend get-away and a rental property. It was named after a novel by Beatrice Harraden, a best-selling British novelist who stayed there in 1894. After the addition of a music room, it became the site of free concerts featuring local musicians and touring artists. Held invited the whole village, from Portuguese fishermen and their wives to the wealthy Scripps sisters.

By the summer of 1899, Held had added three more structures to her parcel of land: The Den, the Studio, and a tent house with a wooden floor. Eucalyptus trees were hung with Japanese lanterns to welcome evening guests.

Around 1902, Held resigned from her position as governess and devoted her time to building rental cottages. She bought two additional lots and within a few years had twelve cottages with quaint names like The Gables and Open Door. There was a boat-shaped structure known as the Ark and a Palm House covered with branches.

The Green Dragon Colony soon became a popular tourist destination, thanks to a 1901 article in the San Francisco Chronicle that described Anna Held as one of the chief attractions: “She is thoroughly Bohemian in her tastes and manner of living.”

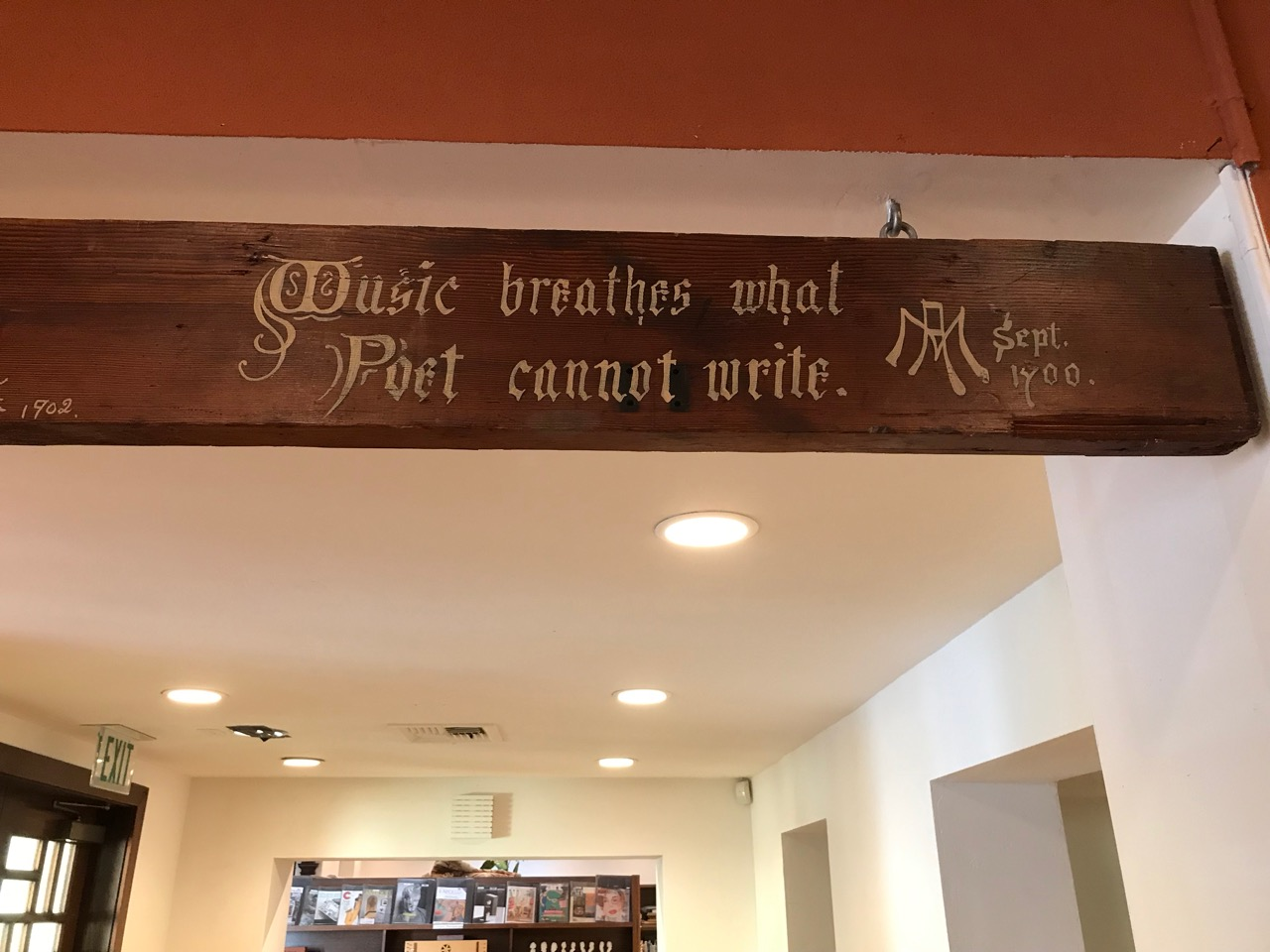
Detail, wooden beam from the Green Dragon Colony, La Jolla, now in the Athenaeum Music & Arts Library

Anna invited her guests to treat her woodwork like a guest book and leave autographs, verses, or musical notations on the doors and beams. In 1900, one guest inscribed the phrase, “Music breathes what the Poet cannot write,” on a beam that now hangs from the ceiling of the Athenaeum Music & Arts Library.

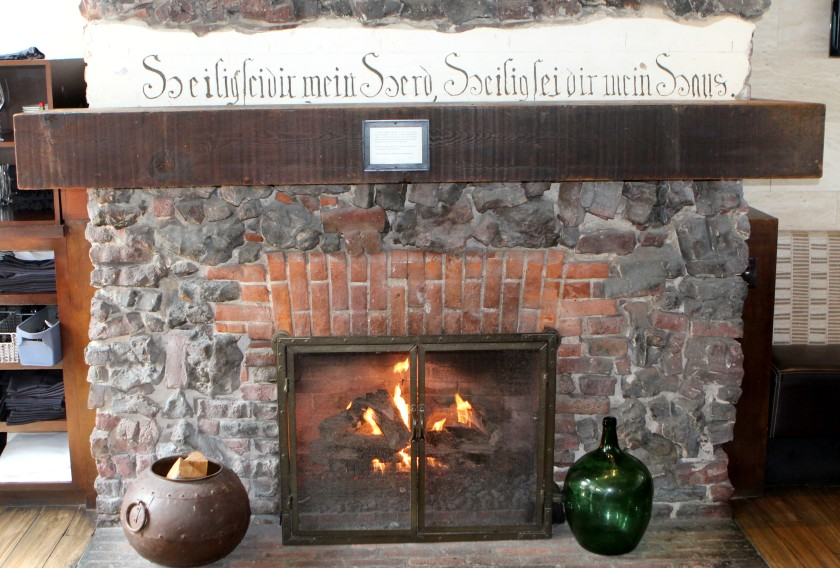
Fireplace originally in Wahnfried, one of the cottages in the Green Dragon Colony, Eddie V's restaurant, 2019

At the age of fifty-five, Held married the celebrated baritone Max Heinrich. Together, they built another cottage named Wahnfried (1904), after Richard Wagner's villa in Bayreuth, Germany. The structure had a deep stone fireplace with an inscription over the mantle, “Heilig sei dies Herd, Helig sei dies Haus” (Sacred to this hearth, Sacred be this house). The fireplace, together with the inscription, has been incorporated into Eddie V's restaurant.

In 1912, Anna Held Heinrich sold the Green Dragon Colony for $30,000, having purchased it for $165. Wahnfried became a tearoom frequented by a younger generation that wanted a taste of bohemian life. It later became a restaurant.

=== 1920-present ===
La Jolla changed dramatically in the decades after 1900. No longer a rustic seaside village, it was developing into a year-round tourist destination with hotels—the Cabrillo Hotel (1908) and the Colonial Hotel (1911)—and restaurants. Dozens of seasonal cottages were built as vacation rentals.

In 1926, the Green Dragon property was purchased by Josephine Seaman who maintained the property for two decades.

In 1944, it was purchased by Jack M. and Alice Mosher, retirees who intended to restore the colony. Between 1947 and 1957, their son, architect Robert “Bob” Mosher (1920–1995), AIA, converted the Green Dragon Colony into collection of small shops and art galleries.

In 1948, Bob Mosher and Roy Drew established an architectural firm, Mosher and Drew, that designed residential and commercial buildings in San Diego. Their office was located in one of the Colony's early redwood residences. A modernist, Mosher is best known for his designs for the San Diego-Coronado Bridge, John Muir College at University of California, San Diego, and San Diego State University's Aztec Center.

In the 1970s, the cottage known as Wahnfried became part of The Chart House Seafood Restaurants. The cottage was demolished in 1991, but the surviving fireplace was incorporated into Eddie V's restaurant in 2011.

== Historic Preservation ==
The 1960s were a decade of dramatic change in La Jolla as a "land boom" led to rapidly increasing real estate prices. Small cottages began to be demolished and replaced by high rises and modern commercial buildings.

The site of the Green Dragon Colony, but not its buildings, was listed as a San Diego Historical Landmark in 1973 (HRBS 84). The only other designated site in La Jolla was the La Jolla Woman's Club. In 1986, four of the remaining cottages were designated as historic by the City of San Diego Historical Site Board. Architect Robert Mosher appealed that decision, intending to raze the cottages and build a hotel. In 1990, Mosher filed permit applications to demolish the structures, having been unsuccessful in persuading the City of San Diego to take responsibility for the site.

The last four cottages were demolished in 1991, before a restraining order could prevent further destruction. Superior Court Judge Barbara T. Gamer failed to account for the California Coastal Commission's requirements for a 10-day waiting period on any demolition until an appeal could be filed. The destruction provoked the wrath of preservationists who scrambled to salvage what remained of the buildings. Architect and preservationist Toni Ciani described the process as “unconscionable.”

In 1991, California Governor Pete Wilson signed a bill that tightened controls on historical properties. He cited the Green Dragon Colony as an example of why tougher laws were needed.

== See also ==
- Google Arts & Culture: La Jolla's Coastal Legacy
