= Robert Mosher =

American architect (1920–2015)

Robert Mosher (September 27, 1920 – July 26, 2015) was an American architect who operated primarily in Southern California. Mosher was a pioneer of the post-war modernist architecture movement in San Diego. He is best known for designing the San Diego–Coronado Bridge and the University of California, San Diego's John Muir College.

== Early life ==
Born in Greeley, Colorado, Mosher moved to Los Angeles as a young child. Mosher's interest in architecture and design began early: at age nine he built a workbench in his family's garage. According to Mosher's wife, Joany, Mosher was first introduced to architecture through a neighbor involved in Pasadena real estate development.

With a sustained interest in architecture and design, Mosher went on to attend the Art Center School in Los Angeles in 1939, the University of Southern California School of Architecture from 1939–40, and eventually earned his Bachelor of Architecture from the University of Washington, Seattle in 1944.

After earning his degree in 1944, Mosher moved to La Jolla and apprenticed with the firm Myron Hunt & H. C. Chambers. It was there where he met his future business partner, Roy Drew. After completing his state architecture exams and working for eight months at the firm of Harwell Hamilton Harris in Los Angeles, Mosher returned to San Diego to found his own firm in 1946. Mosher's father purchased a collection of buildings in La Jolla known as the Green Dragon Colony, a former artist's colony, to serve as the firm's headquarters. Roy Drew joined as a partner in 1948.

The San Diego region, like much of Southern California, underwent dramatic growth in the immediate postwar years, in turn, providing fuel for the growth of Mosher and Drew's firm. "We got more work and just chugged away at it," Mosher recalled about the period, in a 1988 interview. Mosher's career was advanced when his design for a home for Herbert and Minerva Kunzel of Point Loma, received media exposure by way of Sunset magazine. This article in turn came to the attention of the editor of House Beautiful, Elizabeth Gordon. Gordon, impressed with Mosher's understanding of architectural theory, invited him to New York City for a two-year stint as architectural editor for the magazine. Mosher accepted the offer. During the period at House Beautiful, Mosher interviewed his hero, Frank Lloyd Wright for a special 1955 issue of the magazine. In preparation for the issue, Mosher shadowed Wright around his studio, Taliesin, in Spring Green, Wisconsin over the course of two separate weeks.

== Later career ==
After the stint in New York City, Mosher returned to his practice in San Diego. Mosher's design of the Golden Door Spa in Escondido, opening in 1958, illustrated his aptitude for historical architecture, as well as his usual modernism. The Spa's design was heavily informed by 16th and 17th century ryokan, traditional Japanese inns.

In the mid-1960s, Mosher was hired by the newly created University of California, San Diego to be executive architect for the first building of the university's second college, later named after naturalist John Muir. Shortly thereafter, he was designated to lead a team of architects to design the remainder of the college's buildings.

Mosher designed many other prominent structures within the San Diego area including: the San Diego-Coronado Bridge, San Diego State University's Aztec Center, and 225 Broadway.
