= Sun God (statue) =

Sculpture by Niki de Saint Phalle in San Diego, California, U.S.

Coordinates: 32°52′42.76″N 117°14′23.08″W

- Artist: Niki de Saint Phalle
- Year: 1983
- Type: Fiberglass with cement base
- Dimensions: 8.8 m (29 ft)
- Location: Stuart Collection, University of California San Diego, La Jolla

Sun God is a monumental statue by French-American sculptor Niki de Saint Phalle, located on the campus of the University of California, San Diego. The figurative sculpture is a 14-foot (4.3 m) multicolored bird-like creature, perched atop a 15-foot (4.6 m) tall arch-shaped, vine-covered concrete pedestal.

Erected in February 1983 as the first of the Stuart Collection of public art projects, the polyester and fiberglass Sun God has become a notable feature of the UC San Diego campus, with many traditions surrounding the statue. It is located on a grassy area between the Faculty Club and Mandeville Auditorium, East of John Muir College and Sixth College.

Since the 1980s, the UC San Diego Associated Students Concerts & Events division has sponsored an annual event, the Sun God Festival, with the statue as its official mascot. Over the years, numerous students have accessorized the statue with items such as sunglasses; a cap and gown; an ID card; a large, water-spraying phallus; and even a nest with eggs painted in the statue's trademark bright colors.
