= John Muir College =

Second college at UC San Diego

- UC San Diego
- Coordinates: 32.879021°N 117.24242°W
- Motto: Celebrating the Independent Spirit
- Established: 1967
- Former names: Second College
- Status: Undergraduate, liberal arts
- Colors: Muir Green
- Provost: Dr. K. Wayne Yang
- College Leadership: Dean of Students Dr. Jason Thibodeaux Asst. Dean of Students Dr. Claudia Peña Dean of Academic Advising Dr. Douglas Easterly Director of Residential Life Dr. Sonia Rosado Director of the Muir College Writing Program Dr. Carrie Wastal
- Residents: 4,227 (17.0% of UCSD campus population)
- Core course: Muir College Writing Program (MCWP)
- Major events: Festival: Muirstock

John Muir College (Muir or Muir College), is one of the eight undergraduate colleges at the University of California San Diego (UC San Diego). The college is named after John Muir, the environmentalist and founder of the Sierra Club. It has a humanitarian emphasis focused on the "spirit of self-sufficiency and individual choice." The college opened in 1967, at the height of the American environmental movement triggered in part by Rachel Carson's book Silent Spring. John Muir College describes itself as the "Heart of UC San Diego" and boasts a strong and distinct character after fifty years of existence.

== Housing ==
In addition to gender-segregated residence halls and apartments, John Muir College has housing exclusively for lesbian, gay, bisexual, transgender, queer, intersex and asexual (LGBTQIA+) students.

== Requirements ==
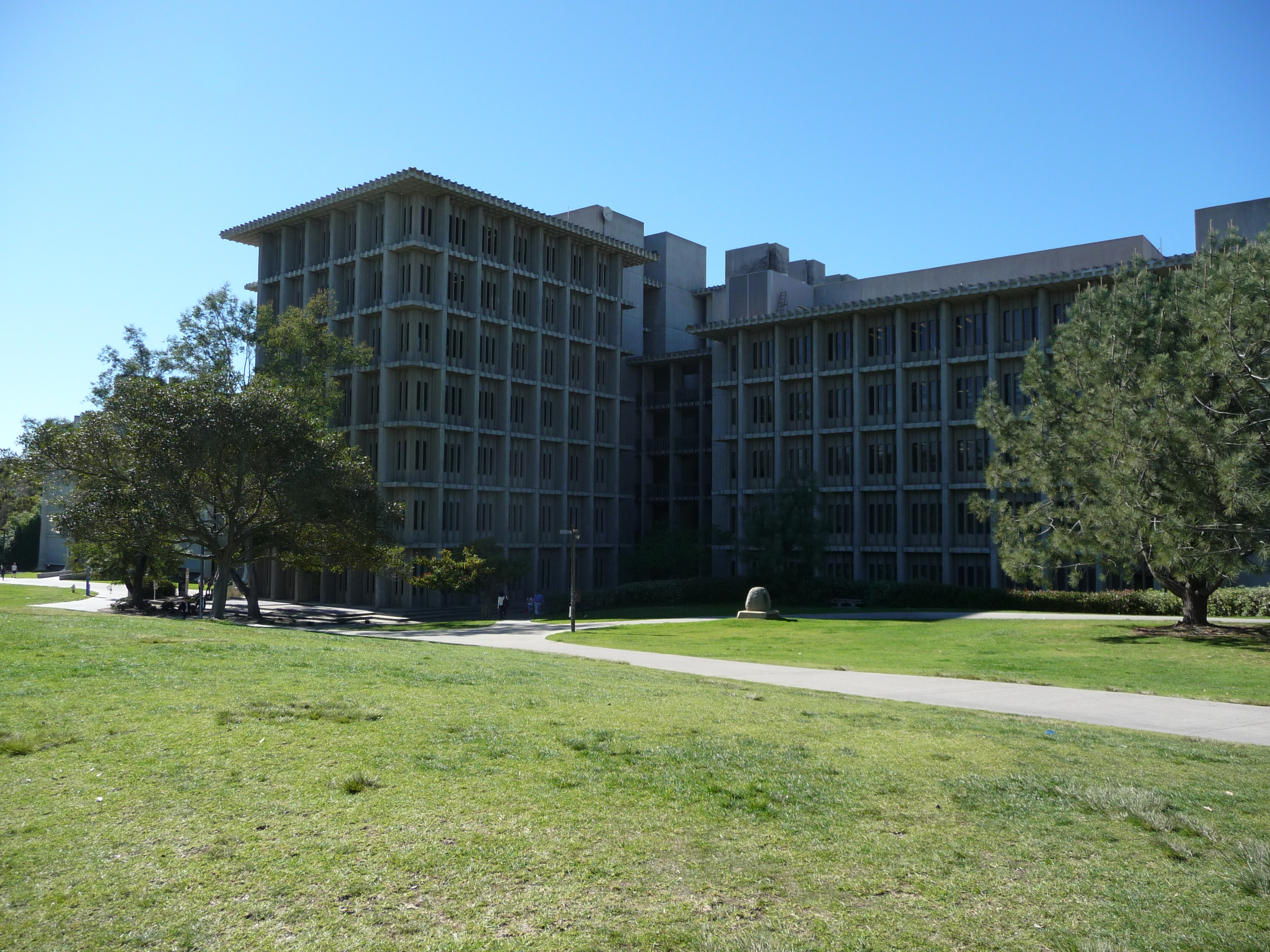
Applied Physics & Mathematics building

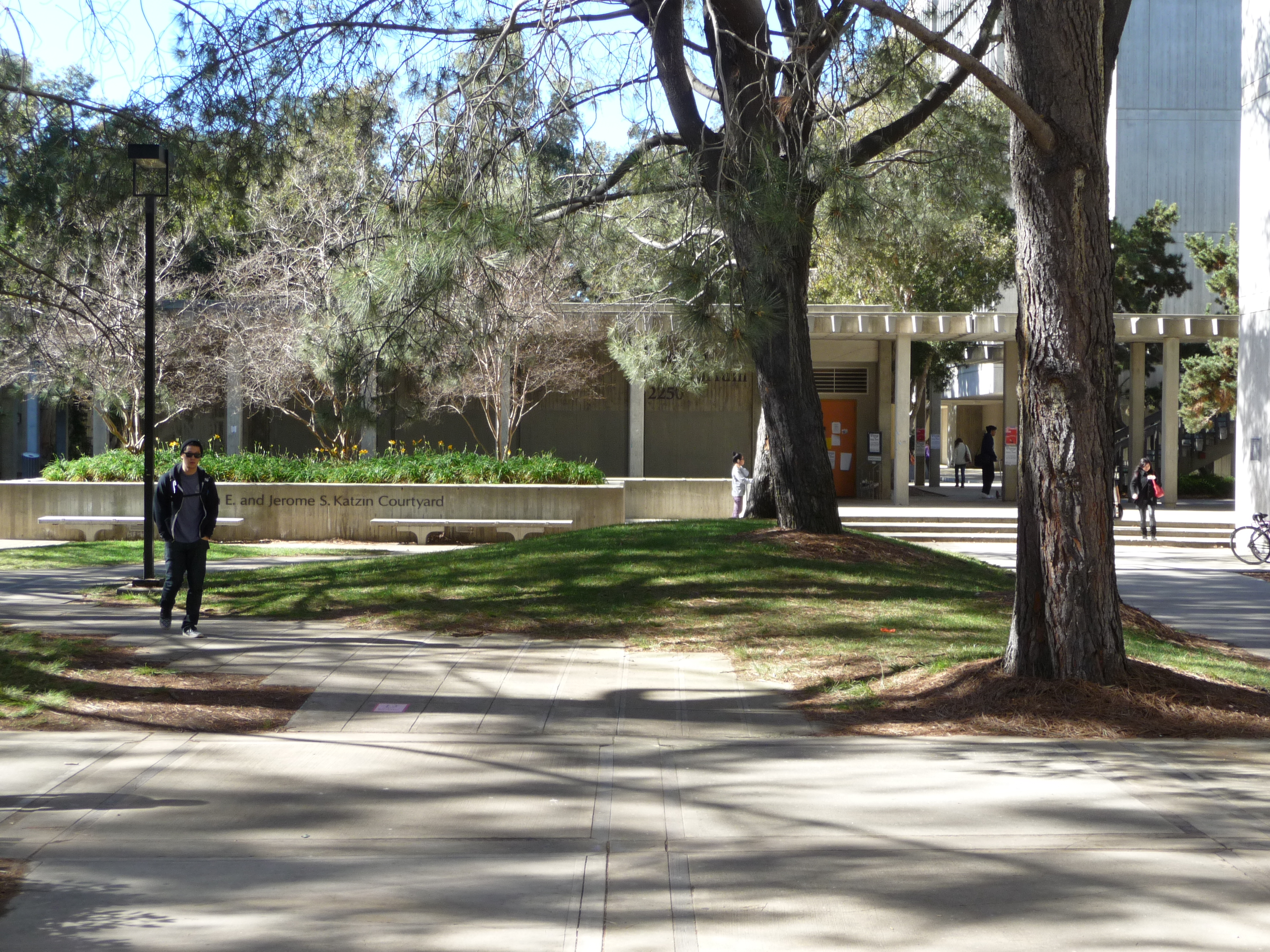
Jerome Katzin Courtyard

John Muir College's general education requirements are more loosely structured than those of the other colleges, with an emphasis on "sequences" and individual study. Each student must complete a year-long sequence in social sciences, a sequence in natural science or math, and must choose two year-long sequences in two different areas chosen from fine arts, a foreign language or humanities. In addition, each student must complete two quarters of the "Muir College Writing Program" (MCWP).

Due to JMC's flexible general education requirements, it is very popular among incoming students and receives the most applications each year. Consequently, it employs the most stringent admissions process among the university's eight colleges. The flexibility of the college often encourages a large number of students to pursue multiple bachelor's degrees. Muir College's writing program incorporates college level writing over a two-quarter period, with general critical writing during the first quarter and a themed rhetorical analysis program during the second. Also unique to Muir College is the Muir Special Project major, which allows qualified students to earn a Bachelor of Arts degree by pursuing an individually designed program of interdisciplinary study.

== Landmarks ==
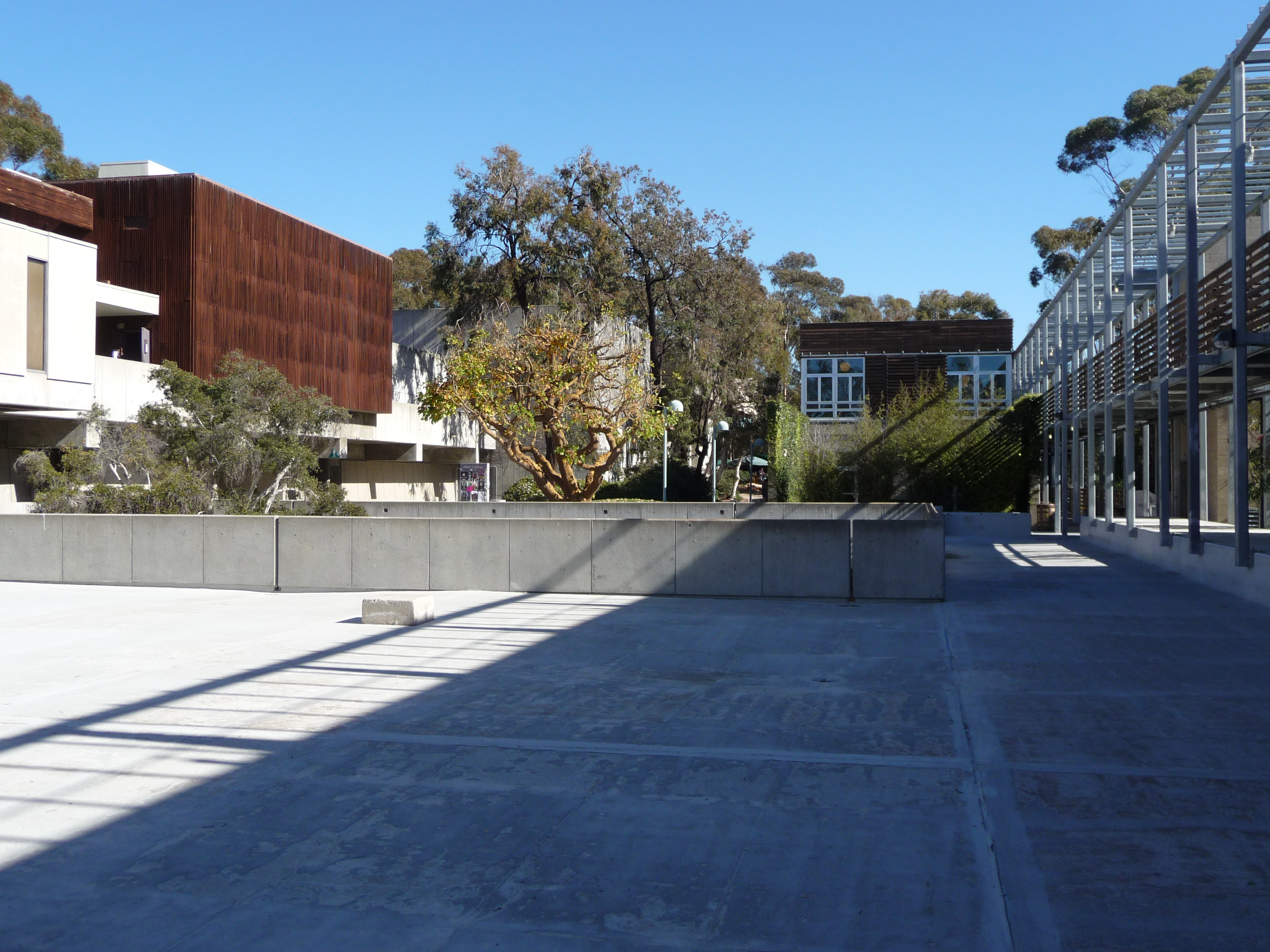
Mandeville Center

Several of the most notable landmarks on the UCSD campus are located at Muir College. Sun God, the colossal statue designed by late French artist Niki de Saint Phalle, stands herald over the grounds of the campus. The 8- and 11-story twin residence halls Tenaya and Tioga along with the 5- and 9-story Tuolumne and Tamarack apartment buildings stand as a testament to the nature-conserving policies of Muir as well as examples of the prevalent architectural style of the 1960s. Muir's connection to California's Yosemite Valley continues with the Half Dome Lounge and the dining hall Pines (formerly Sierra Summit).

In 2012, Muir College opened Roots, the first vegan dining facility on campus that accepts student dining dollars. Muir College is also the location of Middle Of Muir, commonly known as M.O.M., a small general store unique to Muir College that stocks items specifically catered to student needs. Every Halloween, Muir students drop a giant pumpkin from the top of the tallest residence hall as part of the Halloween Carnival.

In 2007, UCSD received a $99,800 grant from the Getty Foundation to preserve Muir College's buildings, which includes significant collection of mid-century modernist architecture, designed by a team of San Diego architects led by Robert Mosher.

== Notable events ==
=== MuirStock Music Festival ===
The MuirStock Music Festival began in April 2001 by the Muir College Council (MCC) with the aim of creating a central unifying event for the Muir community. With an initial budget of $10,000, the festival has grown exponentially and become a major, annual all-campus event. It is known as the original UCSD college music festival. The MuirStock concert always features Indie or up-and-coming artists (such as Justin Nozuka, who headlined MuirStock in 2013). MuirStock inspired MarshallPalooza and Rock 'n' Roosevelt, the music festivals for Thurgood Marshall College and Eleanor Roosevelt College. Richard Tashman, then a Muir freshman, designed the original MuirStock logo, which featured a tree growing out of a guitar.

After the pandemic calmed down, Muir Student Affairs revived the concert again. With the help of the 2021-2024 Graphic design intern, Siul Maduena, Muirstock was revamped visually to its current new logo. From here and Siul's direction as chair in 2023, they have had people such as Tinashe, Joyce wrice, La Gabi, and Rico Nasty.
