= RIMAC =

Sports complex at the University of California, San Diego

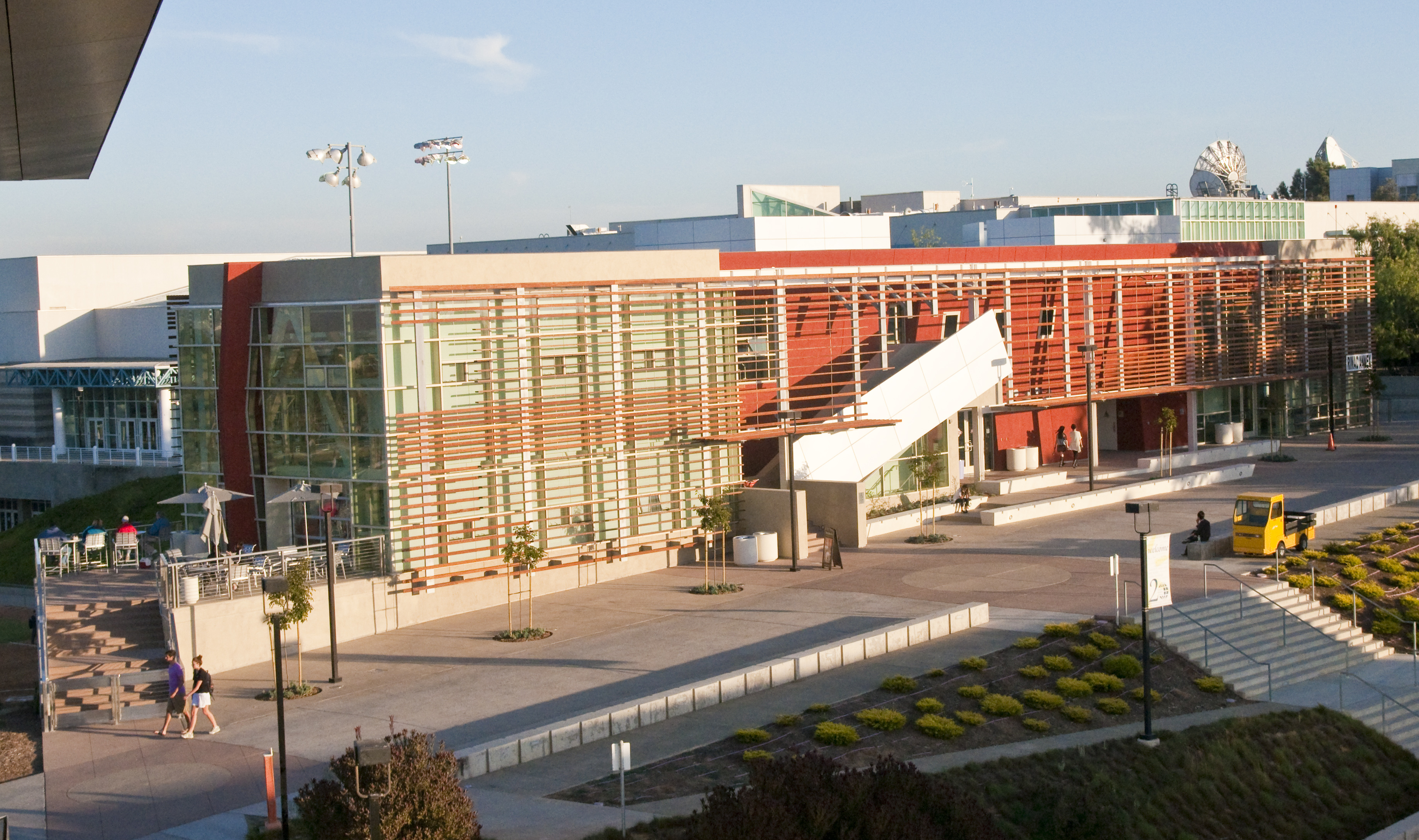
- RIMAC Annex as seen in 2015
- Interactive map of RIMAC
- Full name: Recreation, Intramural, and Athletic Complex
- Address: 9860 Hopkins Drive
- Location: San Diego, California
- Coordinates: 32.885278°N 117.239223°W
- Owner: UC San Diego
- Operator: UC San Diego Athletics
- Capacity: 5,000 (Arena); 4,000 (Basketball); 750 (Soccer stadium); 17,000 (Sun God Festival)
- Type: Sports complex
- Field size: 44,000 sq ft (4,100 m^{2}) (Arena); 505,000 sq ft (46,900 m^{2}) (Field)
- Public transit: Gilman Transit Center, MTS, NCTD

Construction
- Groundbreaking: 1992
- Opened: 1995; 31 years ago
- Expanded: 2008
- Architect: Parkin Architects

Tenants
- UC San Diego Tritons (NCAA) teams (1995–present): men's and women's basketball, soccer, softball; San Diego Zest FC (PDL) (2016–present)

Website
- recreation.ucsd.edu

The Recreation, Intramural, and Athletic Complex (RIMAC /ˈriːmæk/ REE-mak) is a sports complex in San Diego, California, located on the campus of the University of California, San Diego. Opened in 1995, the complex comprises various athletic facilities in the northwest area of the campus.

LionTree Arena is the home of the UC San Diego Tritons men's and women's basketball, men's and women's volleyball, and men's and women's fencing teams. Triton Soccer Stadium is the home of the men's and women's soccer teams.

The Tritons compete in NCAA Division I as a member of the Big West Conference (BWC) for basketball, volleyball, and soccer, and the Mountain Pacific Sports Federation (MPSF) for fencing.

== History ==
In 1990, UC San Diego proposed a fee increase of $70 per student to fund a new athletic and event complex. Advocates of the project argued that the existing Main Gym did not have enough aerobic or weight-lifting space to support a rapidly growing university. In addition, Main Gym only seated 2,200 and was rarely available for concerts. The referendum narrowly passed with 51% of the votes, but the results were contested for years.

In September 1991, the Regents of the University of California approved a $33.5 million design by Parkin Architects for the proposed complex, which was architecturally similar to the existing Price Center. Construction began in December 1992, and the facility was completed in December 1994. Upon its completion, RIMAC was the largest NCAA Division III athletic complex in the country and remains one of the largest among all universities. The complex was inaugurated by First Lady Hillary Rodham Clinton's speech dedicating the newly named Eleanor Roosevelt College.

Since 2011, the facilities have been run by the Director of Event Management Marc Beasley.

In 2015, RIMAC was LEED-silver certified by the U.S. Green Building Council.

UC San Diego announced on June 16, 2022, that RIMAC Arena has been renamed LionTree Arena in recognition of a $5 million gift for scholar-athletes.

== Arena building ==
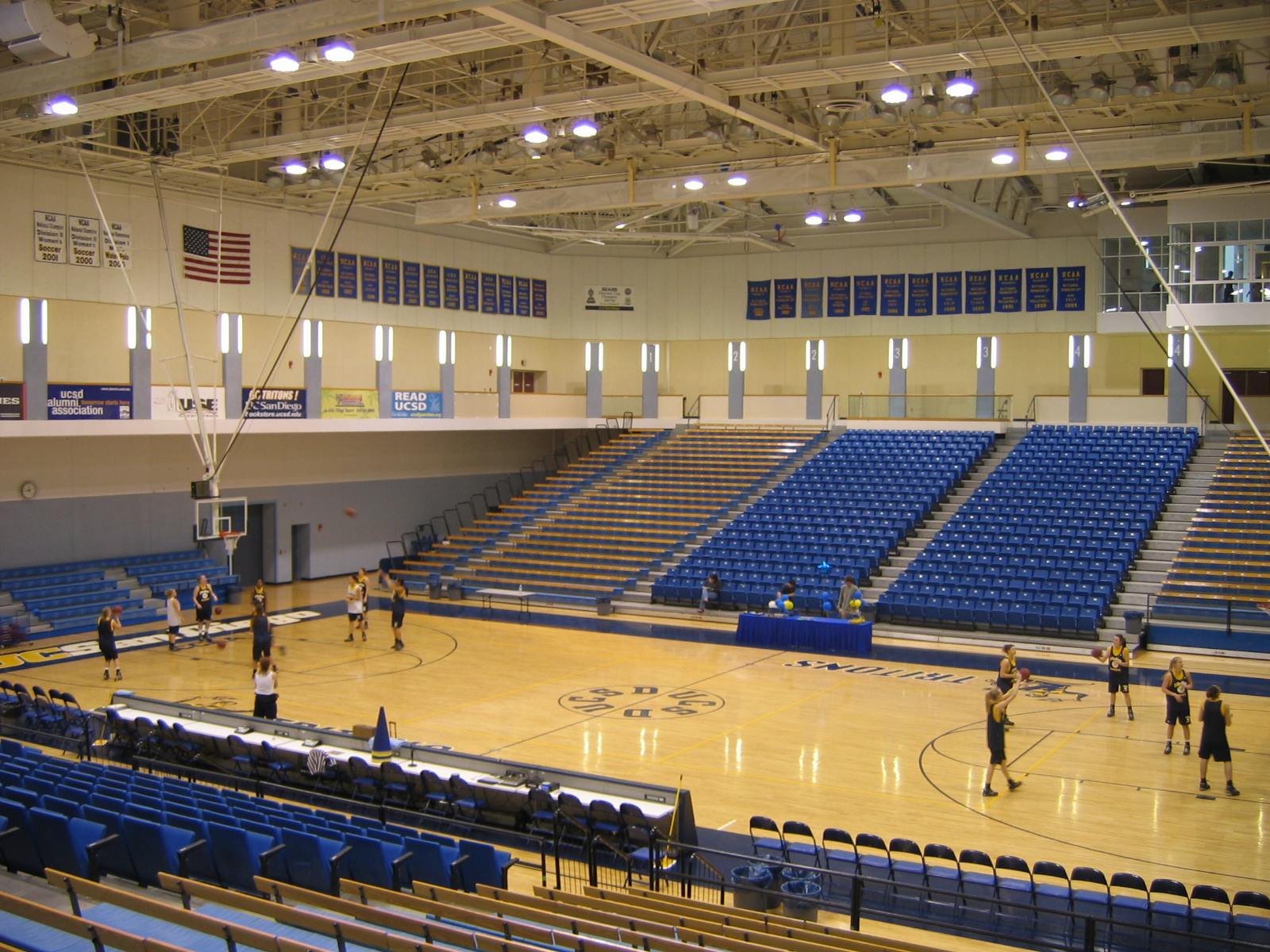
LionTree Arena

LionTree Arena is the name used to refer to the 186,000 square foot building that houses both the home arena of the Tritons and the adjacent auxiliary gym. The 44,000 square foot arena itself stands 52 feet tall (45 feet from floor to rafters) and contains six dressing rooms and a 60-by-40-foot-stage, among other facilities. It seats 4,200 spectators in the bleachers for Triton basketball and volleyball home games, expandable to 5,000 through the use of floor seats for concerts. Curtains can divide the facility into five basketball courts that use Robbins Bio-Cushion I flooring. The floor space can also be used for conventions, concerts, trade shows, and other events. In the past, it has hosted training camps for the National Basketball Association's Phoenix Suns, Los Angeles Clippers, and Sacramento Kings. Since 2011, concerts have been exclusively booked by Nederlander Concerts.

The auxiliary gym accommodates two additional basketball or volleyball courts, as well as three mirrored activity rooms, two squash courts, eight racquetball courts, a wellness center, a pro shop, two conference rooms, and two locker rooms. It also contains a 12,000 square foot weight and fitness room, which was the highest priority for students upon construction. This supplements the original UCSD Main Gym weight room, as well as the subsequently constructed Spanos Training Facility and Canyonview Aquatic Center. A 3,000 square foot pit can be reserved for athletic teams.

== Field ==
RIMAC Field is an 11.8-acre Santa Ana Grass field located immediately northeast of LionTree Arena. The field is used for NCAA, club, and intramural athletic events, as well as the UC San Diego convocation and commencement ceremonies. It can be divided into five regulation soccer fields or adapted for concerts and music festivals. Previously, it was used by the San Diego Chargers as their training camp facility.

UC San Diego's annual Sun God Festival is held on RIMAC Field. The festival, which features two concert stages and various attractions, typically approaches the field's maximum attendance of 20,000. Like those at LionTree Arena, outside concerts on RIMAC Field have been exclusively booked by Nederlander Concerts since 2011.

=== Triton Soccer Stadium ===
For NCAA soccer games, a western section of RIMAC Field is cordoned off by temporary fences to create a regulation-sized soccer pitch. Permanent stone bleachers on the west side of the stadium allow a maximum capacity of 750, which can be expanded to 1,750 through the use of temporary bleachers for NCAA postseason fixtures. A commentary and scoring table is usually erected opposite the bleachers between the two teams' benches. The UC San Diego men's and women's soccer teams play their home games here.

=== Triton Softball Field ===
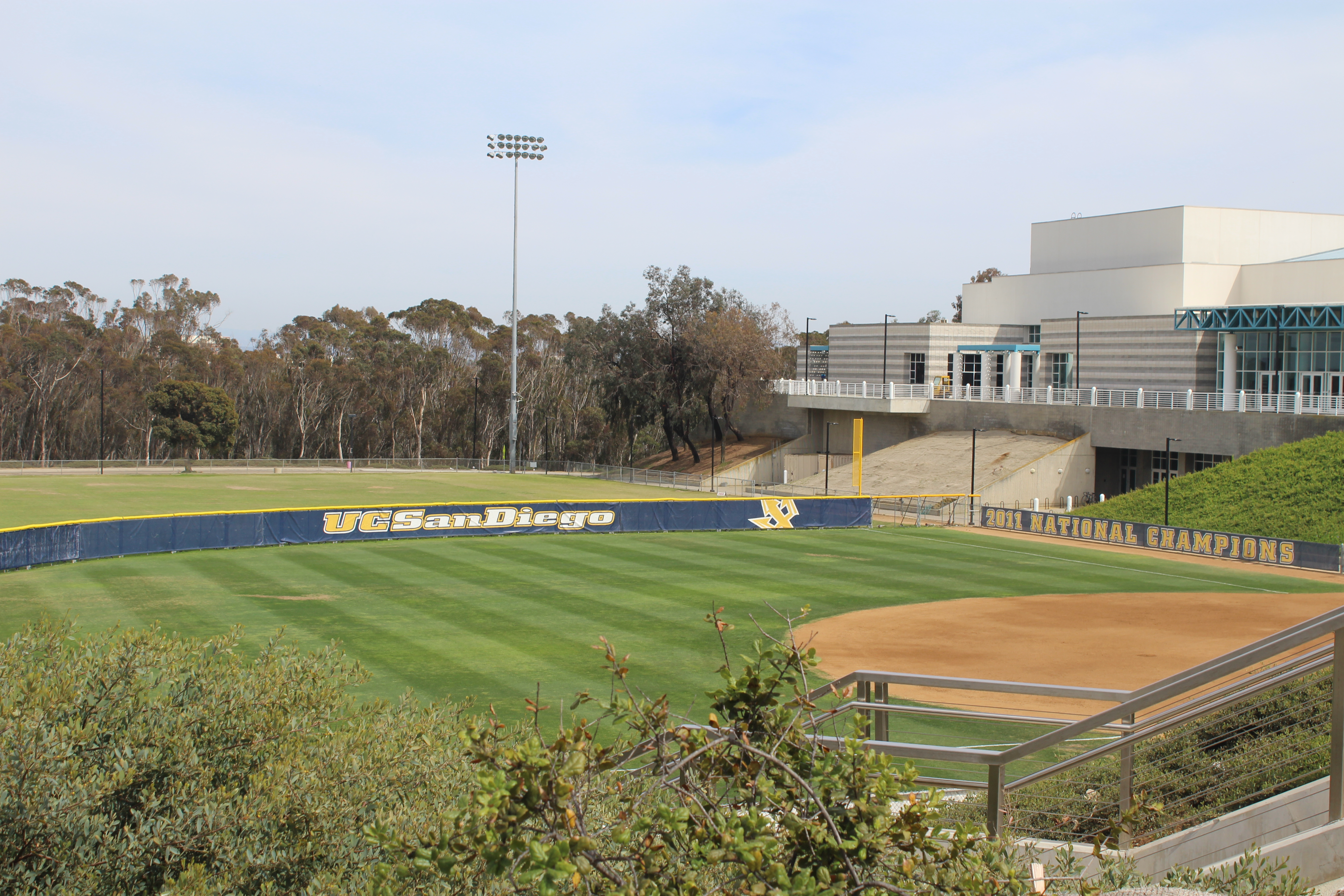
The Triton Softball Field on RIMAC Field

The regulation-sized UC San Diego softball field is located just south of Triton Soccer Stadium. It is usually separated from the rest of RIMAC Field by a fence that measures 220 feet from home plate. In 2008, the school spent $8.6 million to expand the bleachers, improve the dugouts and field, and add a press box.

== RIMAC Annex ==
RIMAC was originally planned to include more conference-room space, dining facilities, additional hot tubs, saunas, a rock-climbing center, and an outdoor resource center. Budget controversies forced the university to postpone many of these plans. In 2005, discussion reopened regarding the expansion of RIMAC's facilities to keep up with growing student demand, but these plans were again postponed. Finally, in 2008, construction began on RIMAC Annex, a 10,000-square-foot building located adjacent to LionTree Arena. The $10 million building was completed September 2009.

RIMAC Annex opened with several meeting spaces and study lounges, a convenience store, and a Peet's Coffee and Tea. A sports bar opened shortly afterwards.

== See also ==
- List of NCAA Division I basketball arenas
