= The Modlins =

- Origin: San Diego, California, U.S.
- Genres: Indie rock, twee pop
- Years active: 2004-present
- Labels: Aural Gravy Records
- Members: Eric Killian; Chris Rhanor; Matt Sheridan; Alex Smith/ Chousmith
- Website: with-friends-like-these.blogspot.com

The Modlins are an indie band from San Diego, California. They formed in 2004 and are composed of Matt Sheridan, Eric Killian, Chris Rhanor, and Al Smith. Their albums Here's to Being Happy, With Friends Like These, Where Does it End?, and Shoot the Moon were nominated for San Diego Music Awards in 2007, 2008, 2009, and 2010. With Friends Like These - their sophomore full-length, released in December 2007 - went on to win Best Pop Album at the 2008 San Diego Music Awards. Influences include the Beatles, the Kinks, the Shins, Elliott Smith, Chuck Berry, and Belle & Sebastian. The group went on hiatus in fall of 2010. The entire Modlins discography was re-released by San Diego record label Aural Gravy Records in spring 2014. The group returned with two new albums in 2018 and continues to write more music.

== Discography ==
=== Albums ===
- Here's To Being Happy (2007)
- With Friends Like These (2007)
- Where Does It End? (2009)
- Late Night Feel (2010)
- Shoot The Moon (2010)
- Can't Get Back (2018)
- Out of the Darkness! (2018)

=== EPs ===
- The Daniel EP (2004)
- The Andrew EP (2005)
- The Michael EP (2005)
- The Mark EP (2009)

=== Compilations ===
- Passed 'Masters' (2012)

== Band members ==
- Eric Killian (vocals, right-handed guitar)
- Chris Rhanor (drums)
- Matt Sheridan (vocals, left-handed guitar)
- Alex Smith / Chousmith (vocals, bass guitar)
