= Eleanor Roosevelt College =

Fifth college at UC San Diego

- University of California, San Diego
- Coordinates: 32.885293°N 117.242737°W
- Motto: Developing World Citizens Through Scholarship, Leadership, and Service
- Established: 1988
- Former names: Fifth College
- Status: Undergraduate, liberal arts
- Colors: Roosevelt Blue
- Website: roosevelt.ucsd.edu

The Eleanor Roosevelt College (Roosevelt or ERC) is an undergraduate residential college at the University of California, San Diego.

While ERC has students of all majors, the college emphasizes international understanding in its co-curricular programming and general education requirements, requiring students to complete the Making of the Modern World history and writing program, a regional specialization, and demonstrate basic proficiency in a foreign language.

== History ==
In 1985, a planning committee recommended the creation of a new college at UC San Diego focused on comparative cultural and historical studies to augment its four existing undergraduate colleges and their different general education foci. The Academic Senate approved the proposal in May 1986 and James Lyon was appointed founding provost of Fifth College in March 1987. UCSD's colleges receive a numeric designation until a permanent name is later chosen. In fall 1988, Fifth College welcomed its inaugural class. The college was named Eleanor Roosevelt College (ERC) in a dedication ceremony in 1995, at which First Lady Hillary Clinton delivered an address. In 2003, ERC moved to its current location in a newly built college complex on the northwestern region of the university campus.

Like all UCSD colleges, ERC is led by a provost, who is a faculty member appointed to oversee the college for a five-year term. The provost is the highest academic officer in the college and oversees its organizational structure, which includes academic advising and student affairs, residence life, an academic program (the Making of the Modern World), and UCSD's International House. Currently, ERC's Provost is Dr. Ivan Evans.

== Academics ==
While ERC students major in all disciplines, the college's thematic focus is on international understanding and engagement. Its general education requirements include proficiency in a foreign language, a regional specialization in which students take 1 lower- and 2 upper-division courses related to a specific region of the world, and ERC's world history and cultures core sequence called The Making of the Modern World (MMW).

Founded in 1988, MMW is a five-course, lower-division sequence (MMW11 – MMW15) for students entering as freshmen and a two-course, upper-division sequence (MMW121 – MMW122) for transfer students. MMW is taught by departmental faculty in the Division of Arts and Humanities and the Division of Social Sciences as well as by faculty appointed directly to MMW. MMW is taught every quarter during the academic year and in summer and is offered both on campus and abroad on Global Seminars. Since 2008, MMW has taught 38 programs abroad (2008–2020) on six continents to more than 800 students. In 2017-18 the program launched MMW Serves, which combines an MMW course with spring break service experiences, which have been offered on Catalina Island, in National Parks, and on the Navajo Reservation

In addition, MMW provides community engagement and volunteer opportunities for students, including through its program working with San Diego's refugee community.

ERC offers First Year Experience courses for incoming first-quarter students. These courses are designed for new students at UC San Diego and provide critical skills and valuable resources to facilitate engagement and foster academic success and personal enrichment. These are 2-credit courses with one hour of faculty-led lecture and one hour of student-led discussion section each week. These ERC courses are taught by the Making of the Modern World Program faculty and sections are led by undergraduate discussion leaders who have received specialized training. First quarter students can enroll in ERC 1 "Freshman Year Experience," and transfers can enroll in ERC 2 "Transfer Year Experience."

Beyond this, ERC offers freshman and senior seminars that address diverse topics, including disability awareness, the global refugee situation, and meditation and well-being.

ERC emphasizes the value of study abroad and one third of ERC students go abroad. In addition, ERC has developed its own international programs, offering summer MMW Global Seminars and ERC Regional Specialization programs abroad as well as spring break service projects, both international and domestic.

ERC is the sponsor of UCSD's International Migration Studies and Human Rights minor.

=== Honors ===
First year students who hold exceptional high school GPAs and who received a high score on the SAT/ACT are invited to participate in the ERC First Year Honors Seminar. The Provost teaches the seminar, which students receive one unit of credit for (per quarter).

Second year students with a GPA of 3.5+ and who have completed three of the five courses in the MMW sequence are invited to participate in the ERC Sophomore Honors Project. Students take on a research project with the assistance of a professor. They are awarded two units of independent study credit per quarter.

Students who earn a quarter GPA of 3.5+ whilst taking 12+ graded units receive Provost's Honors, which appears on students' transcripts.

== Facilities and housing ==
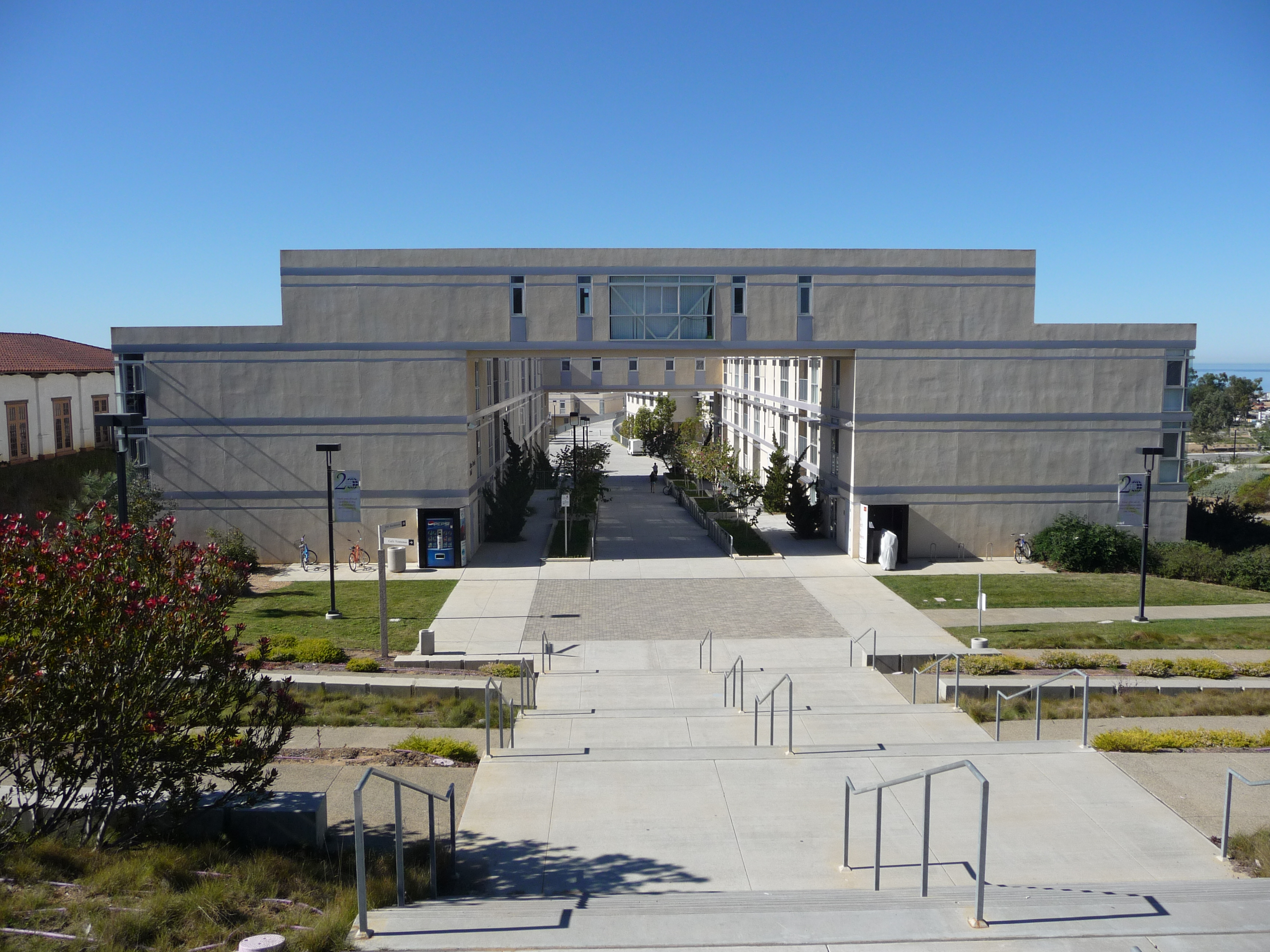
Mesa Verde Hall, an ERC apartment complex.

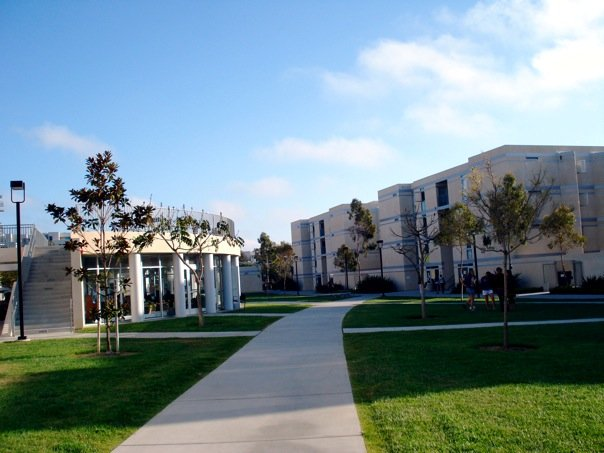
The ERC Green, featuring Middle Earth on the left, and residence halls on the right.

Eleanor Roosevelt College's current location was designed by the architect Moshe Safdie. Safdie designed the buildings within ERC so that they would not interfere with the campus's ocean view. It has also been noted that the layout of ERC was designed to bring people together.

The residential facilities are named after global regions and seek to integrate the philosophy of the college into their design. There are five residence halls for freshmen (Africa, Asia, Europe, Latin America, and North America Halls) and six apartment complexes for sophomores (Earth Hall North, Earth Hall South, Middle East, Oceania, Geneva, and Mesa Verde Hall).

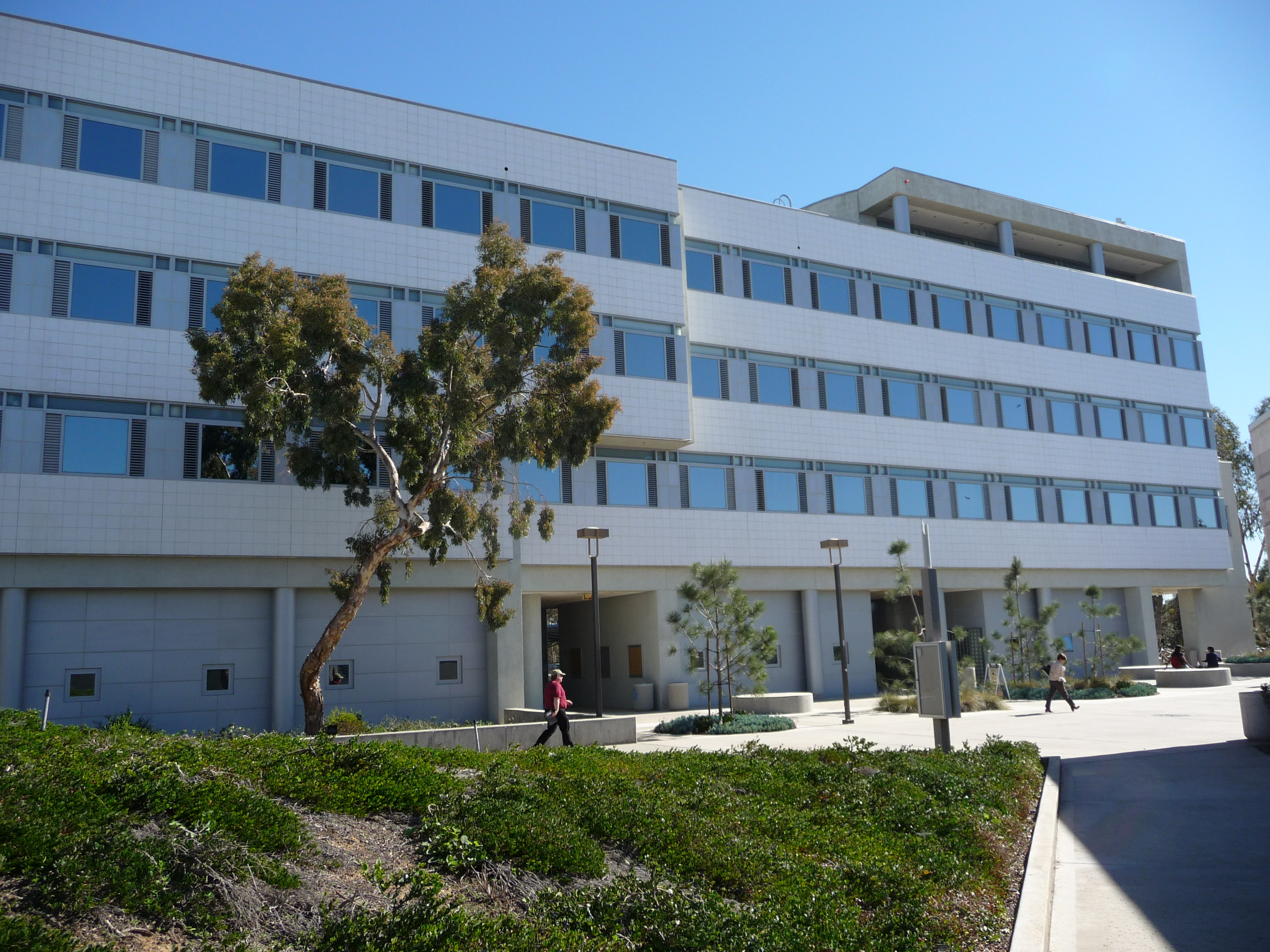
The Social Sciences Building (SSB), located in the northern part of ERC.

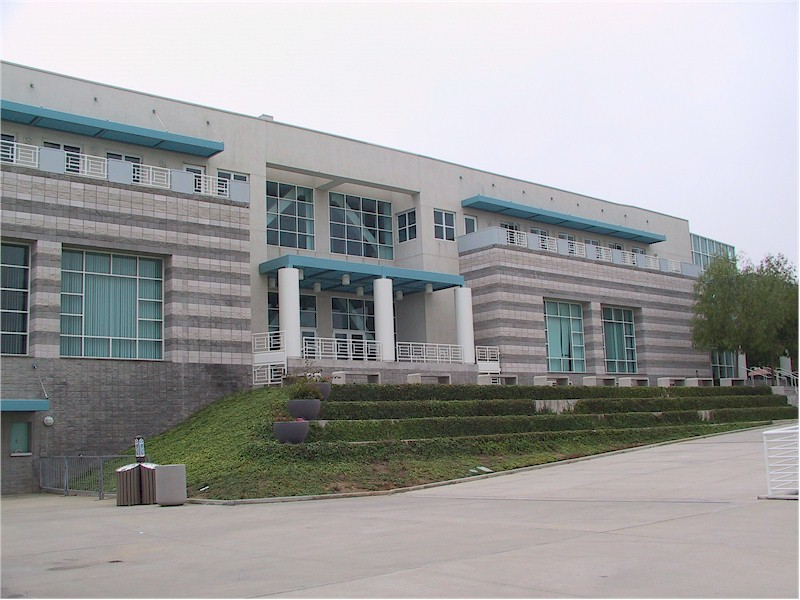
LionTree Arena at RIMAC.

The residence halls are on the western side of the ERC Green. Middle Earth, a common lounge, sits in front of the Earth Hall North and South apartment buildings, which are on the eastern side of the Green. Café Ventanas, ERC's dining hall, is on north side of the Green. To the south of the Green is the Student Activity Center, a laundromat, and an Amazon locker. Behind the Student Activity Center is the Pangea Parking Structure.

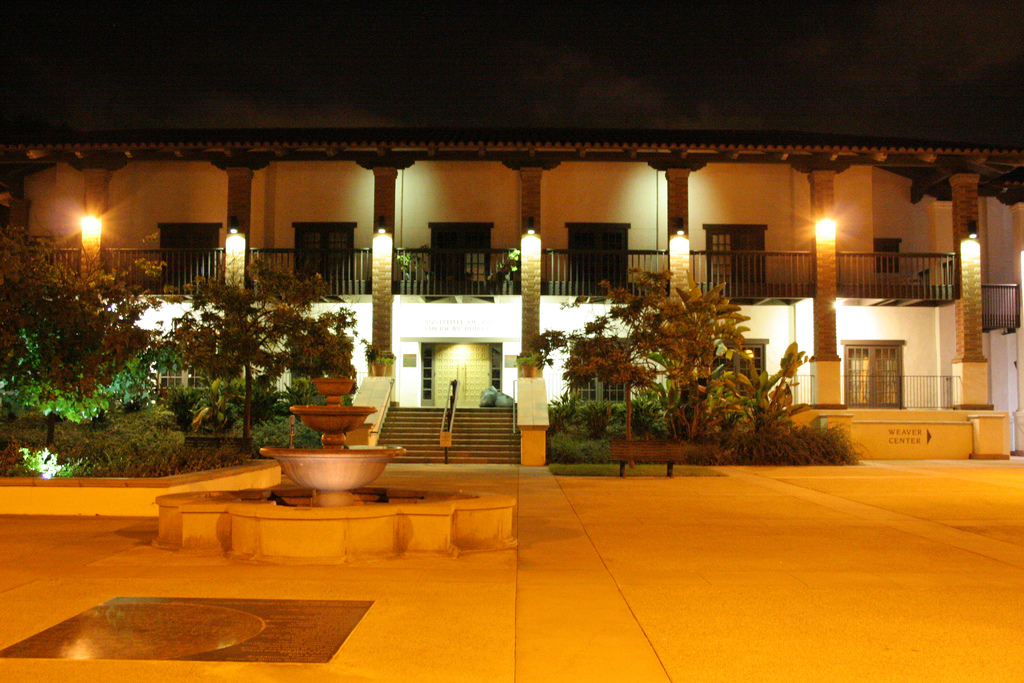
Institute of the Americas, located in the northern part of ERC.

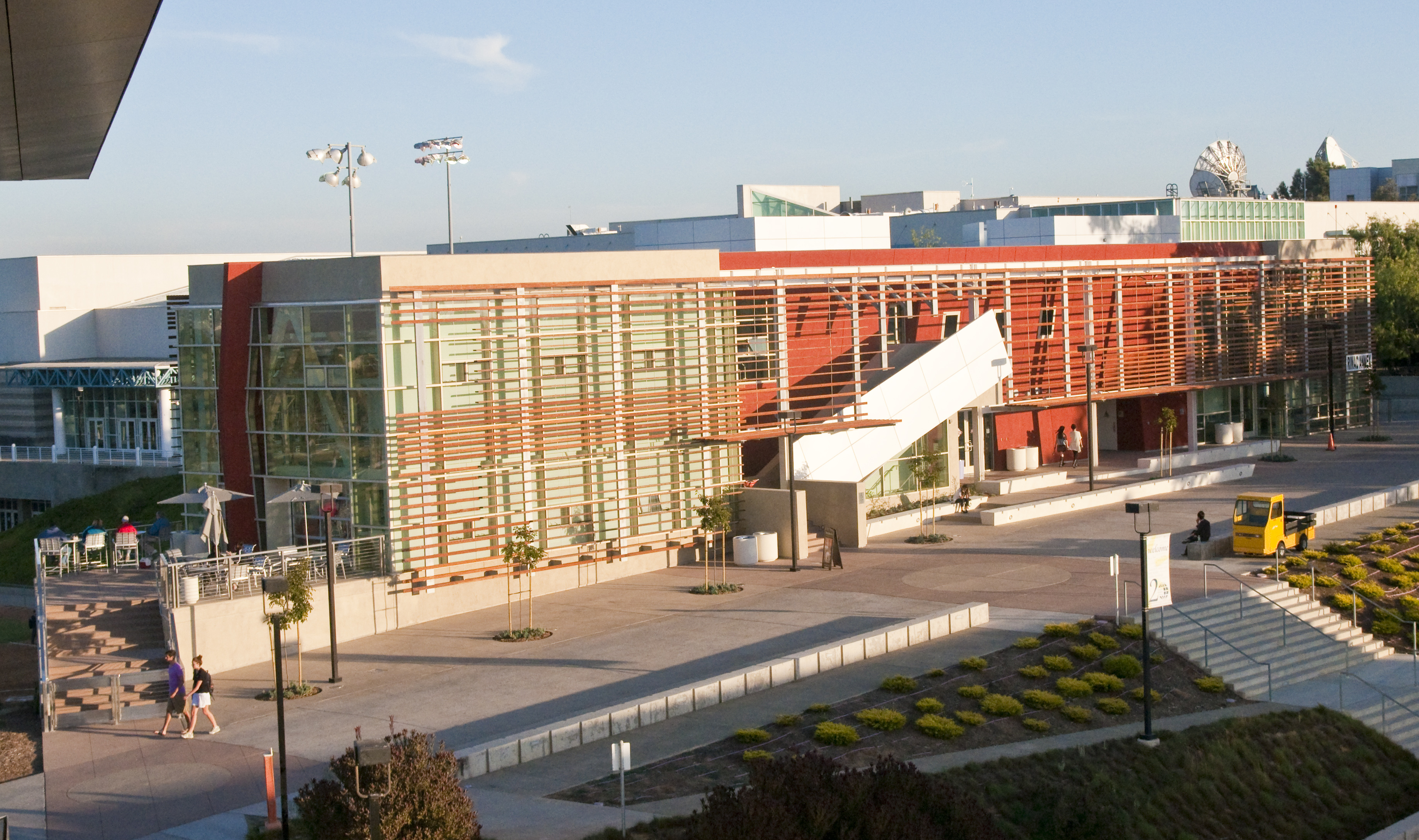
RIMAC Annex.

ERC hosts three Living Learning Communities (LLCs). Living Learning Communities seek to bring together a like-minded group of people who want to live together. The Raza LLC, for Latinx students, is located within one of the residence halls for new students, and I-House for continuing students. The Gender Inclusive LLC is located in the ERC apartments and I-House. Students who participated in the OASIS Summer Bridge program for first-generation college students can opt to live in the OASIS LLC.

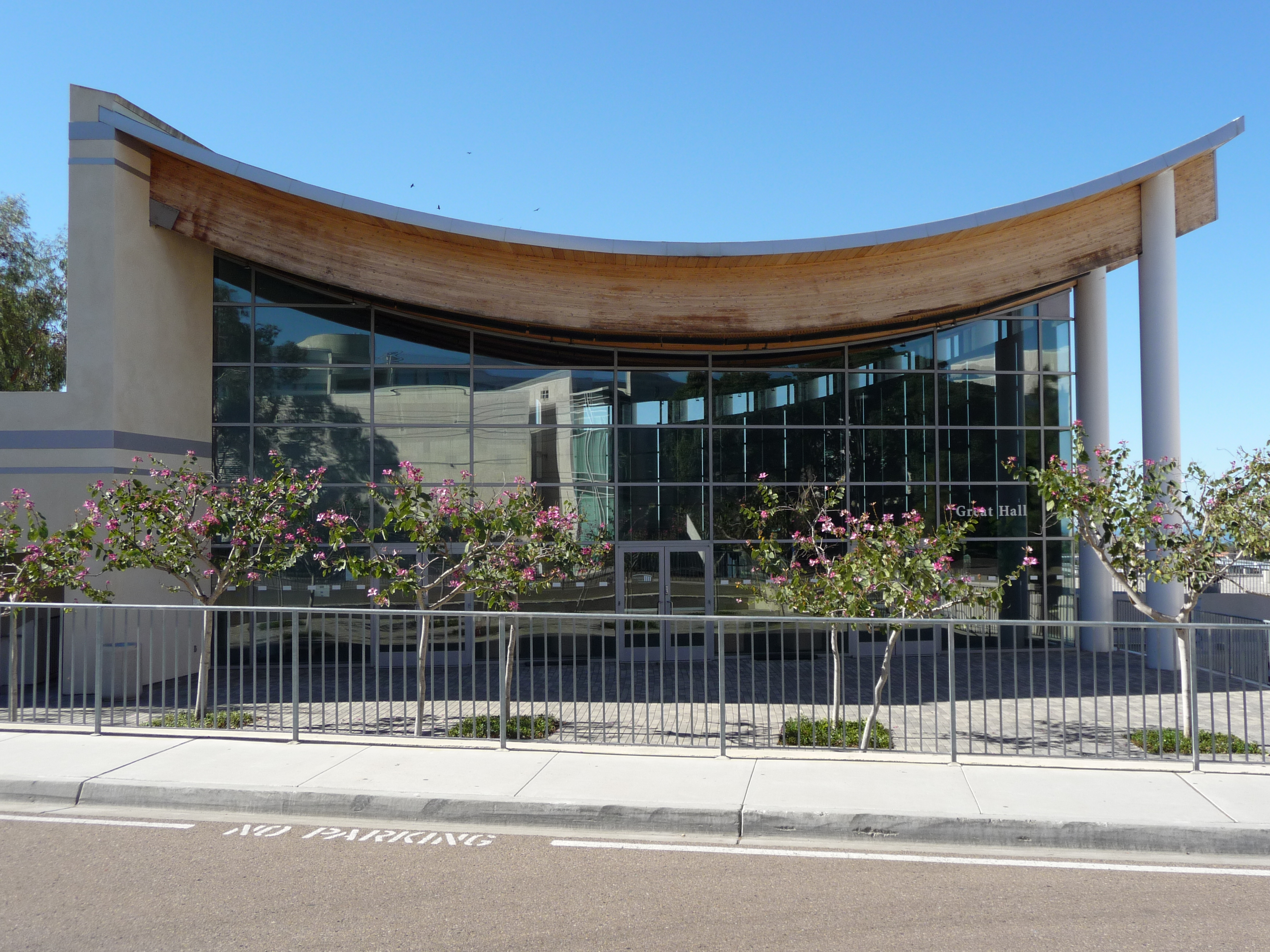
The Great Hall, an event center located in Eleanor Roosevelt College's I-House neighborhood.

=== International House (I-House) ===
ERC also is home to UCSD's International House (I-House), whose residents are composed of half international and half domestic students. I-House consists of four apartment buildings: Geneva Hall, Kathmandu House, Cuzco House, and Asante House. I-House also contains the Great Hall, a basketball court, four classrooms, a laundromat, and an activity center.

Faculty and post-graduate visitors can live in fourth-floor furnished apartments inside of I-House. They are called Visiting Scholar Bridge-unit Apartments, as the units act as bridges between the two sides of the apartment building. Visiting Scholar Bridge-unit Apartments are located in the Asante, Kathmandu, and Geneva buildings.

The Great Hall is an event center in ERC, and is used for I-House and ERC events. It can also be rented for private events.

Four classrooms are located in Asante House.

== Student organizations ==
Circuit Research Journal (or ERC Circuit) is an undergraduate research journal that publishes the work of ERC students.

Community Outreach Effort (CORE) does volunteer work in the San Diego community. Members of CORE volunteer at nursing homes, reservations, and children's hospitals. CORE also sponsors the BreakAway Global Service (BAGS) trip during spring break, in which ERC students do humanitarian work in another country.

Ellie's Garden at ERC (EGERC) cares for the community gardens located in between Asia and Africa halls, and between Europe and Latin America halls.

Planning Activities at Raza LLC (PaRa) represents students living in the Raza LLC. It plans events for those living in the Raza LLC, as well as all Latinx students.

Planning Events at Roosevelt College (PERC) hosts social events for ERC residents. PERC meets Wednesday nights at 6pm in Middle Earth.

Queers & Allies of ERC (QuERC) seeks to bring LGBT people and their allies together, and to raise awareness for LGBT issues.

The Rock 'n' Roosevelt Committee (RnR) is in charge of planning the annual event Rock 'n' Roosevelt, a concert held on the ERC Green.

=== International House (I-House) organizations ===
International House of Planning (IHOP) plans events for I-House, and sponsors field trips off-campus.

International Studies Student Association (ISSA) is made up of students majoring/minoring in International Studies. Members can gain help from and make connections with International Studies alumni through the organization. ISSA also has volunteer opportunities for those that are interested in them.

Model United Nations (MUN) prepares students for diplomatic careers by simulating international conflicts. Students can participate on the "logistical team," planning MUN's annual TritonMUN and SanDiMUN conferences. Students can also participate as full members, participating in diplomatic scenarios and getting to travel for conferences.

Prospect Journal of International Affairs is a student-run research journal.

Members of Refugee Connections volunteer in refugee communities and raise awareness for issues affecting refugees. The organization also fundraises in order to support its costs, with its biggest event being the Culture Cap soccer tournament. Students majoring or minoring in Global Health gain field experience through Refugee Connections by helping refugees with their healthcare needs.

Roteract at UCSD is a youth chapter of Rotary International. Roteract makes Water Pasteurization Indicators (WAPIs) to be sent to developing countries, and serves in the local community. The club also meets once per week.

== Events and traditions ==
During the first week of the quarter, ERC hosts/promotes several Welcome Week events, designed to allow new students to become familiar with the campus and make friends. One of these events is the UnOlympics, a competition between the eight UCSD colleges. Students from ERC compete against students from other colleges in athletic events, with one of the colleges winning the Golden Shoe trophy.

On Halloween, Middle Earth, a common area inside of Eleanor Roosevelt College, is turned into a haunted house for students to visit.

During Spirit Week in winter quarter, ERC is decorated in blue and gold, the school colors. At Spirit Night, when the men's and women's basketball teams play their biggest rivals, students from ERC compete with students from other colleges to cheer the loudest and win the Spirit Night Trophy.

Rock 'n' Roosevelt is a free concert held on the ERC Green during winter quarter. Artists, including Augustana, We the Kings, Saint Motel, Reel Big Fish, Rooney, The Format, Karmin, and Bad Suns have performed at Rock 'n' Roosevelt in the past.

Also during winter quarter, ERC hosts a Casino Night inside of the Great Hall, offering food and raffle prizes along with the games.

During spring break, a group of ERC students travel and participate in a service project in another country. Students apply for the program in the fall, fundraise in the winter, and complete the trip during spring break. This is called BreakAway Global Service, or BAGS, and is sponsored by one of ERC's student organizations, Community Outreach Effort (CORE).

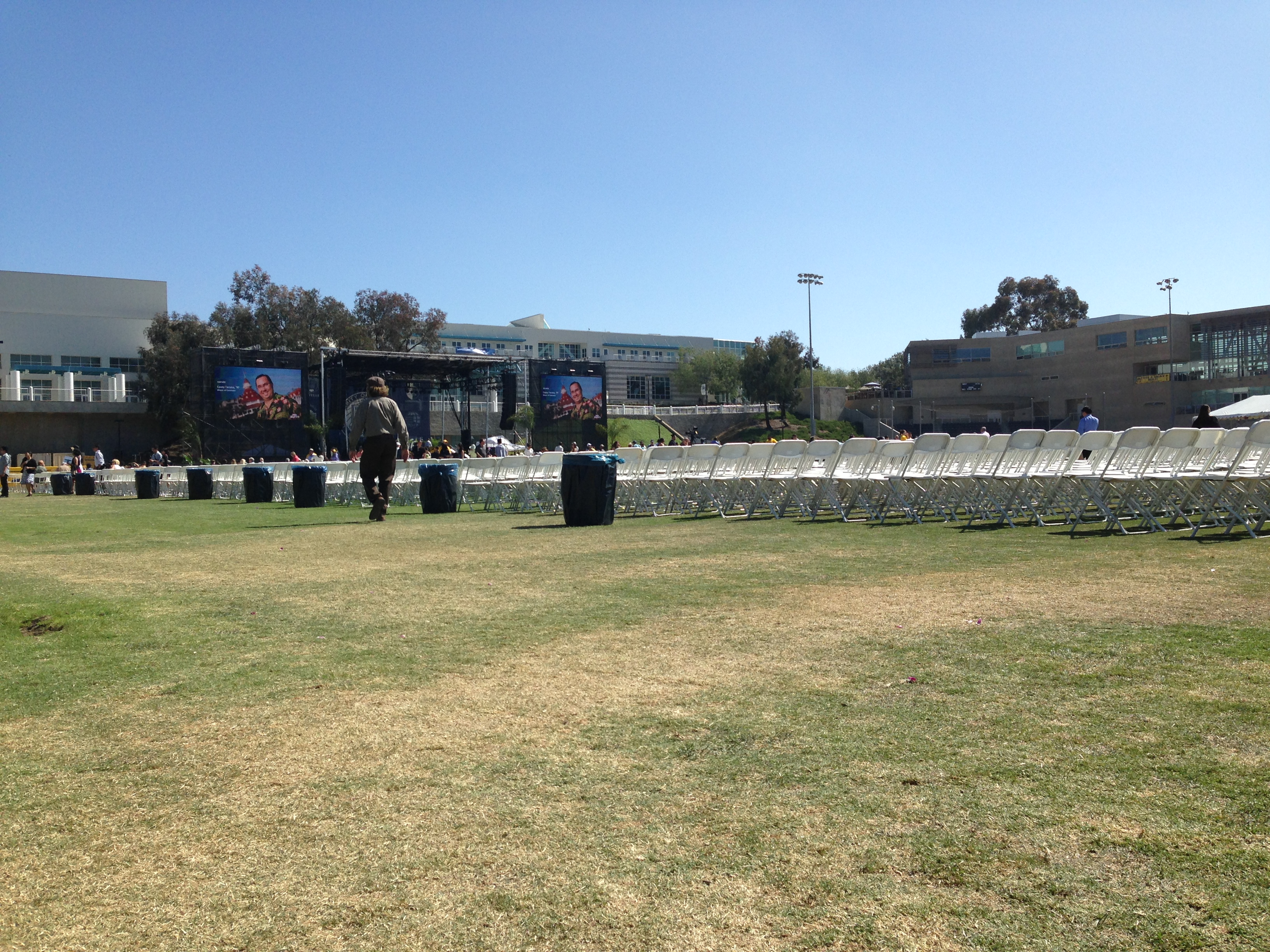
RIMAC Field, where UCSD commencement ceremonies take place.

In the last week of the quarter, Eleanor Roosevelt College hosts the MMW Blowout, a celebration of students' work in the college's general education sequence Making of the Modern World (MMW). The MMW Blowout is set up like a carnival, and features games and free food. One of the games at the MMW Blowout is a dunk tank, with MMW professors and teaching assistants sitting in the tank. The first 500 students to attend the MMW Blowout also receive a free T-shirt.

A Recognition Banquet is hosted at the end of the year to honor student leaders and organizers. ERC also hosts a Senior Brunch, honoring outstanding seniors and celebrating all seniors' graduation.

Because UCSD runs on a college system, students have the option of attending All-Campus Commencement (which all graduating students can attend), commencement with students from their college, or both. ERC's commencement is held at RIMAC Field, usually on the Saturday of finals week.

Every month, Café Ventanas, the dining hall located in ERC, offers food, entertainment, and activities centered around a region of the world in their Global Marketplace event.

Once a year, a blood drive is hosted at the Great Hall by Planning Events at Roosevelt College (PERC), a student-run organization.

The Saturday before finals week at midnight, students from Eleanor Roosevelt College stand outside of their dorms/apartments and scream. This is called the Finals Week Scream, and is practiced by students in all six colleges.

=== International House (I-House) events ===
The International Friday Café takes place in the Great Hall every week. A different type of cuisine is featured every time. Cultural exhibits also take place.

One of the goals of I-House is to get people of different cultures to engage with one another. I-House hosts different types of events throughout the year in order to facilitate this effort: Global Forums, IHeART, Language Conversation Tables, Sunday Supper, and Slice of America are some of them.

Global Forums are hosted every Wednesday evening of the academic year in the Great Hall. Global Forums feature experts in a field speaking about a particular issue, and may include a discussion. I-HeART follows a similar structure to the Global Forum, in which experts speak about an issue to an audience. However, with I-HeART the issue is connected to the arts.

The Language Conversation Tables allow students, staff, and the public to practice conversational language skills with a fluent speaker of a language. The schedule for the Language Conversation Tables changes quarterly, though it usually take place on multiple nights of the week, with different languages being featured on different nights. In order to become a 'host,' one of the fluent speakers whom attendees of the Language Conversation Tables can speak with, students must apply.

Sunday Supper is held once quarterly during the evening. It includes a meal, talk, and performances that all fall under a particular theme.

Slice of America is a quarterly field trip in which students visit a local community/attend a local event in order to gain a broader understanding of the world.

I-Plus is the umbrella term for events hosted/sponsored by I-House not included among their usual program (Global Forums, IHeART, Language Conversation Tables, Sunday Supper, Slice of America). Examples include International Education Week, which I-House sponsors during the fall quarter; International Women's Day, celebrated on March 8; and Compassion Week, an effort by I-House to get students to be more friendly and helpful toward one another.
