= Niki de Saint Phalle =

French plastician, painter and sculptor (1930–2002)

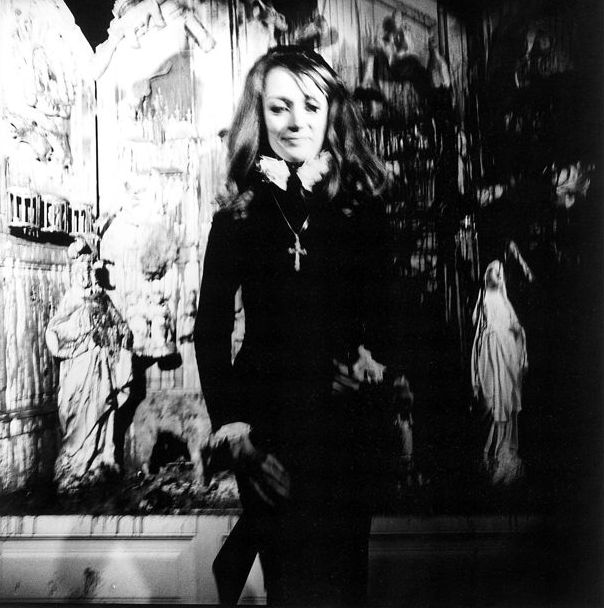
- 1970 portrait by Lothar Wolleh
- Born: Catherine Marie-Agnès Fal de Saint Phalle; 29 October 1930; Neuilly-sur-Seine, France
- Died: 21 May 2002 (aged 71); La Jolla, California, US
- Education: Self-taught in art
- Known for: Sculpture, painting, filmmaking
- Notable work: Tirs; Nanas; Tarot Garden
- Style: Nouveau réalisme, Feminist art
- Spouse(s): Harry Mathews (m. 1949; div. 1961) Jean Tinguely (m. 1971; died 1991)
- Awards: Prix Caran d’Ache (1994); Praemium Imperiale (2000)
- Patrons: Agnelli family
- Website: nikidesaintphalle.org

Niki de Saint Phalle (French: [niki d(ə) sɛ̃ fal]; born Catherine Marie-Agnès Fal de Saint Phalle; 29 October 1930 – 21 May 2002) was a French American sculptor, painter, filmmaker, and author of colorful hand-illustrated books. Widely noted as one of the few female monumental sculptors, Saint Phalle was also known for her social commitment and work.

She had a difficult and traumatic childhood and a much-disrupted education, which she wrote about many decades later. After an early marriage and two children, she began creating art in a naïve, experimental style. She first received worldwide attention for angry, violent assemblages which had been shot by firearms. These evolved into Nanas, light-hearted, whimsical, colorful, large-scale sculptures of animals, monsters, and female figures. Her most comprehensive work was the Tarot Garden, a large sculpture garden containing numerous works ranging up to house-sized creations.

Saint Phalle's idiosyncratic style has been called "outsider art"; she had no formal training in art, but associated freely with many other contemporary artists, writers, and composers. Her books and abundant correspondence were written and brightly colored in a childish style, but throughout her lifetime she addressed many controversial and important global problems in the bold way children often use to question and call out unacceptable neglect.

Throughout her creative career, she collaborated with other well-known artists such as Jasper Johns, Robert Rauschenberg, Larry Rivers, composer John Cage, and architect Mario Botta, as well as dozens of lesser-known artists and craftspersons. For several decades, she worked especially closely with Swiss kinetic artist Jean Tinguely, who also became her second husband. In her later years, she suffered from multiple chronic health problems attributed to repeated exposure to airborne glass fibers and petrochemical fumes from the experimental materials she had used in her pioneering artworks, but she continued to create prolifically until the end of her life.

A critic has observed that Saint Phalle's "insistence on exuberance, emotion and sensuality, her pursuit of the figurative and her bold use of color have not endeared her to everyone in a minimalist age". She was well known in Europe, but her work was little-seen in the US, until her final years in San Diego. Another critic said: "The French-born, American-raised artist is one of the most significant female and feminist artists of the 20th century, and one of the few to receive recognition in the male-dominated art world during her lifetime".

== Early life and education (1930–1948) ==
Catherine Marie-Agnès Fal de Saint Phalle was born on 29 October 1930, in Neuilly-sur-Seine, Hauts-de-Seine, near Paris. Her father was Count André-Marie de Saint Phalle (1906–1967), a French banker, and her mother was an American, Jeanne Jacqueline Harper (1908–1980). (Note: According to the Saint Phalles' wedding announcement in Town and Country (1927), Jeanne Jacqueline Harper, known as Jacqueline, was a daughter of Donald Harper, an American living in Paris, France, and his wife, the former Jeanne Bernard.) Marie-Agnès was the second of five children, and her cousins included the French novelist Thérèse de Saint Phalle (Baroness Jehan de Drouas), her double cousin, daughter of Count Alexandre de Saint Phalle (brother of Count André-Marie) and his wife Helene Georgia Harper (sister of Jeanne Jacqueline). Another cousin was the American-born investment banker, lawyer, and former Office of Strategic Services agent Thibaut de Saint Phalle, who served in the Carter administration as a director of the Export–Import Bank of the United States (1977-1981).

Marie-Agnès was born one year after Black Tuesday, and the French economy was also suffering in the aftermath of the infamous stock market crash that initiated the Great Depression. Within months of her birth, her father's finance company closed, and her parents moved with her oldest brother to the suburbs of New York City; she was left with her maternal grandparents in Nièvre, near the geographical center of France. Around 1933, she rejoined her parents in Greenwich, Connecticut; her father had found work as manager of the American branch of the Saint Phalle family's bank. In 1937, the family moved to East 88th Street and Park Avenue in the affluent Upper East Side neighborhood of New York City. By this time, Marie-Agnès was known as "Niki", the name she would use from then on.

Niki grew up in a strict Catholic environment, against which she repeatedly rebelled. Her mother was temperamental and violent, beating the younger children, and forcing them to eat even if they were not hungry. Both of her younger siblings, Elizabeth and Richard de Saint Phalle, would later commit suicide as adults. The atmosphere at home was tense; the only place where Niki felt comfortable and warm was in the kitchen, overseen by a black cook. Decades later, Niki would reveal that she had suffered years of sexual abuse from her father, starting at the age of 11. She would later refer to the environment where she grew up as enfer ("hell").

She spent most of her childhood and adolescence in New York City, and summers in Connecticut or on Long Island. She frequently returned to France to visit relatives, becoming fluent in both French and American English. In 1937, she attended school at the Convent of the Sacred Heart on East 91st Street in Manhattan. After she was expelled in 1941, she rejoined her maternal grandparents, who had moved to Princeton, New Jersey, and briefly attended the public school there.

She returned to the Upper East Side and studied there at the Brearley School from 1942 to 1944. There, she met Jackie Matisse, granddaughter of artist Henri Matisse; they would become lifelong friends. However, Saint Phalle was dismissed for painting in red the fig leaves on the school's classical statuary. Despite this, she would later say it was there "[that] I became a feminist. They inculcated in us that women can and must accomplish great things." She was then enrolled in a convent school in Suffern, New York, but was expelled. She finally graduated from the Oldfields School in Glencoe, Maryland in 1947.

During her late teenage years, Saint Phalle became a fashion model; at the age of 18, she appeared on the cover of Life (26 September 1949) and, three years later, on the November 1952 cover of French Vogue. She also appeared in the pages of Elle and Harper's Bazaar.

"At one point, Gloria Steinem spotted Saint Phalle walking down Fifty-seventh Street, purseless and in a cowboy getup. In an interview quoted by the show’s curator, Ruba Katrib, in the catalogue, Steinem recalled thinking, 'That is the first free woman I have ever seen in real life. I want to be just like her.'"

== First marriage and children (1949–1960) ==
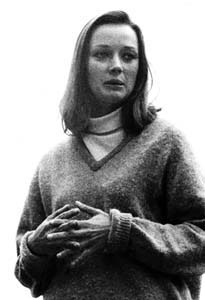
Niki de Saint Phalle in 1964

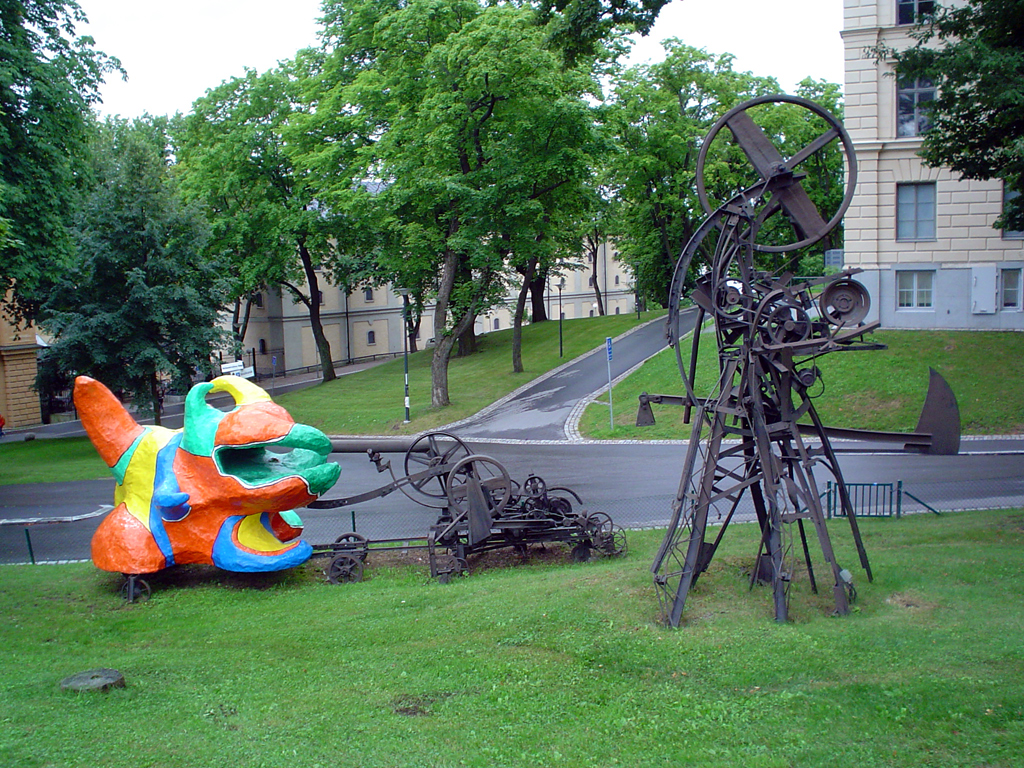
Parts of Le Paradis Fantastique (1967–1971), an early collaboration of Saint Phalle and Jean Tinguely

At the age of 18, Saint Phalle married Harry Mathews, whom she had first met at the age of 11 (he was 12) through her father. Six years later, they again encountered each other by chance on a train to Princeton, and soon became a couple. Initially, they had a civil ceremony on 6 June 1949 in New York City Hall. At the urging of Niki's mother, they also had a religious rite at the French Church of New York the following February, when their nuptials were mentioned in a US Vogue fashion spread featuring her.

Although her parents accepted the union, her husband's family objected to her Catholic background and cut them off financially, causing them to resort to occasional shoplifting. They moved to Cambridge, Massachusetts so Mathews could study music at Harvard University. Saint Phalle began to paint in oils and gouaches but aimed to pursue a career in acting. Their first child, Laura, was born in April 1951. In 1952, the small family moved to Paris, where Harry continued his studies in conducting at I’Ecole Normale de Musique. The new parents were casual, even negligent in their care, but their children would benefit from better financial circumstances after Mathews received an inheritance.

Saint Phalle rejected the staid, conservative values of her family, which dictated domestic positions for wives and particular strict rules of conduct. Poet John Ashbery recalled that Saint Phalle's artistic pursuits were rejected in turn by relatives: her uncle "French banker Count Alexandre de Saint-Phalle, ... reportedly takes a dim view of her artistic activities", Ashbery observed. (Note: According to John Ashbery, Alexandre de Saint-Phalle was the brother of Niki de Saint Phalle's father and also married to her mother's sister, the former Helen Georgia Harper, as explained in "Jacqueline Harper Marries Count: American Lawyer's Daughter Marries Andre de St. Phalle at Château de Fillerval", The New York Times, 7 June 1927. See John Ashbery, Reported Sightings: Art Chronicles, 1957–1987 (Carcanet, 1989).) However, after marrying young and becoming a mother, she found herself living the same bourgeois lifestyle that she had attempted to escape.

For about a decade, the family would wander around France and Europe, living a bohemian lifestyle. In Nice, Saint Phalle and Mathews would have separate affairs in 1953; after she attacked her husband's mistress, she took an overdose of sleeping pills, but they had little effect because she was manic at the time. When Harry discovered a stash of knives, razors, and scissors under a mattress, he took his wife to a mental clinic in Nice, where she was treated with electroshock therapy and insulin shock therapy. Liberated from routine household work, she focused on creating artwork instead and improved enough to be discharged in six weeks. Around the same time, her husband abandoned his music studies and started to write his first novel, eventually switching to a career in writing.

While in Paris on a modeling assignment in 1954, Saint Phalle was introduced to the American-French painter Hugh Weiss, who became both her friend and artistic mentor. He encouraged her to continue painting in her self-taught style.

In September 1954, the small family moved to Deià, Mallorca, Spain, where her son Philip was born in May 1955. While in Spain, Saint Phalle read the works of Proust and visited Madrid and Barcelona, where she became deeply affected by the work of architect Antoni Gaudí. Gaudí's influence opened many previously unimagined possibilities for Saint Phalle, especially the use of unusual materials and objets-trouvés as structural elements in sculpture and architecture. Saint Phalle was particularly struck by Gaudí's "Park Güell" which would inspire her one day to create her own garden-based artwork that would combine artistic and natural elements.

Saint Phalle continued to paint, particularly after she and her family moved to Paris in the mid-1950s. Her first art exhibition was held in 1956 in Switzerland, where she displayed her naïve style of oil painting.

In 1956, she met the Swiss artist Jean Tinguely and his wife, artist Eva Aeppli. Saint Phalle attempted her first large-scale sculpture, enlisting Tinguely to make an iron armature, which she covered with plaster and paint.

In the late 1950s, Saint Phalle became ill with hyperthyroidism and tachycardia, which were eventually treated by an operation in 1958.

In 1959, Saint Phalle first encountered multiple artworks by Yves Klein, Marcel Duchamp, Daniel Spoerri, Willem de Kooning, Jackson Pollock, Robert Rauschenberg, and Jasper Johns. Seeing these avant-garde works triggered her "first great artistic crisis". She switched from oil painting to gouaches and gloss paint, and began to produce assemblages from household objects and castoffs. By this time, she had decided to dedicate herself fully to creating art, free from the obligations of everyday family life.

In 1960, she and Harry separated by mutual agreement, and her husband moved to another apartment with their two children. At that time, her daughter Laura was nine, and her son Philip was five years old. Mathews would occasionally buy artworks from his wife as a way of providing her modest support, and she would visit him and the children periodically.

She soon moved in with Jean Tinguely, who by then had separated from his own wife, Eva Aeppli. He was becoming well known for his kinetic sculptures made from cast-off mechanisms and junk. In many ways, the pair were opposites, and sometimes had violent disagreements, and frequent affairs with others. They would live together intermittently and collaborate closely on artistic projects for over a decade before marrying in 1971. Two years later, they separated, but remained on good terms and continued to collaborate on various projects up through Tinguely's death in 1991.

In 1960, Tinguely introduced her to Pontus Hultén, then the director of the Moderna Museet (Modern Museum) in Stockholm, Sweden. Over the next few years, he would invite her to participate in important exhibitions and acquire her artworks for the museum. He would later become the first director of the Centre Georges Pompidou in Paris (1974–1981), where he continued to be influential in promoting wider recognition of Saint Phalle's artwork.

== Tirs (1961–1963) ==
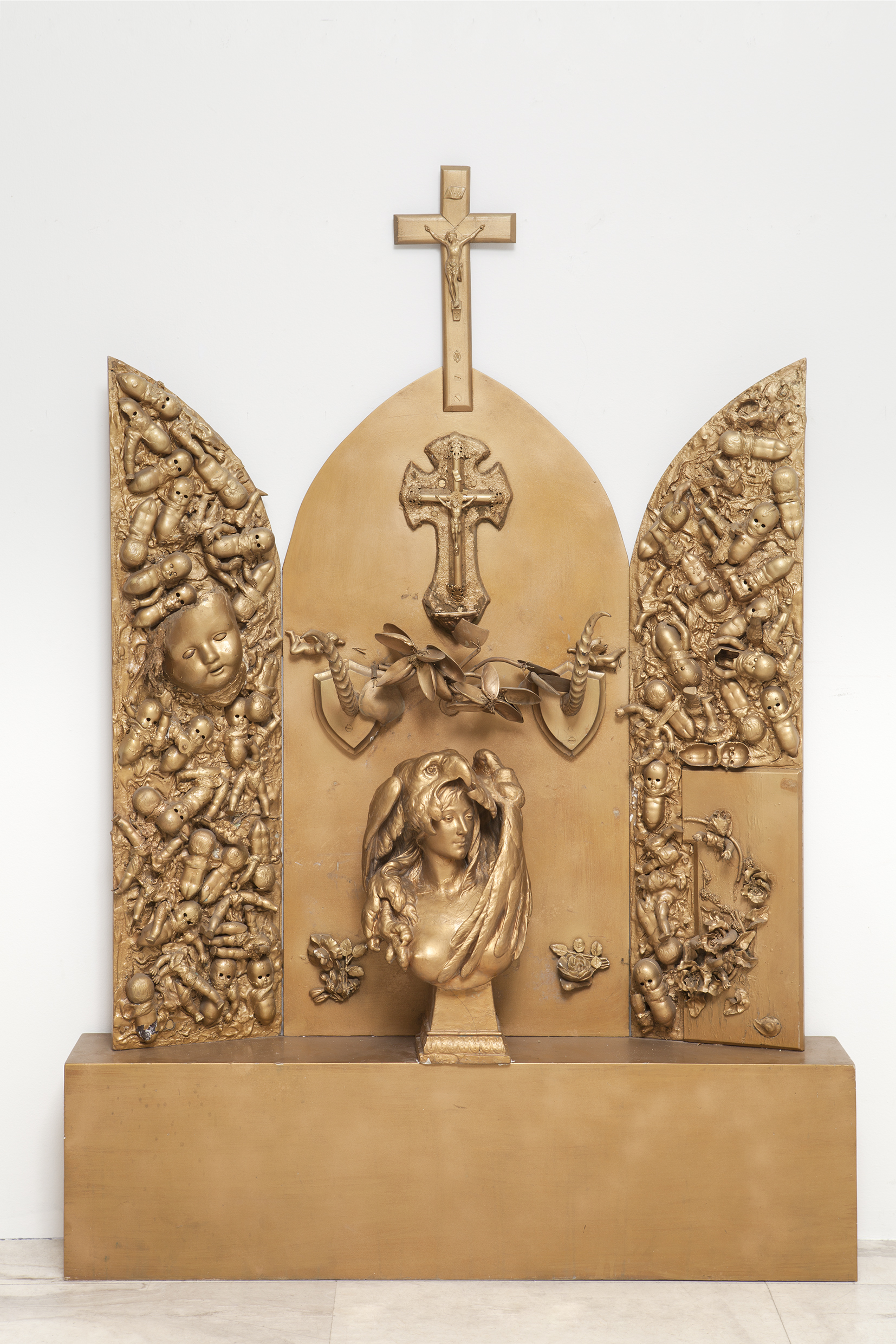
Autel d'or ("Golden Altar", 1962) resembles smaller versions of the Tirs series, but was not shot or paint-splattered

Saint Phalle created a series of works in the early 1960s, she called Tirs ("Shootings" or "Shots"). The series began as "target pictures", with painted bullseye targets prominently displayed within her painted collages, such as Saint Sébastien (Portrait of My Lover / Portrait of My Beloved / Martyr nécessaire) (1961), or Assemblage (Figure with Dartboard Head) (1962). She would invite viewers to throw darts at the dartboards embedded as faces in her figurative assemblages, which were influenced by the targets painted by her friend Jasper Johns.

Soon, she would start by embedding knives, razor blades, scissors, eggbeaters, baby-doll arms, and other household items in plaster covering a large board, along with bags filled with colorful paints, cans of spray paint, and sometimes tomato. Also, she might suspend bags of paint or cans of spray paint in front of the white-painted assemblage. She would then repeatedly shoot the assemblage with a pistol, rifle, or miniature cannon, causing the liquids to "bleed" or to spray out.

Her first staged public shooting event was in February 1961, attended by Jean Tinguely, Daniel Spoerri, and Pierre Restany, among others. Her early art performance/events took place in the "Impasse Ronsin", a trash-strewn back alley in the Montparnasse district of Paris. This cul-de-sac was also the site of the improvised studios of Constantin Brâncuși, Jean Tinguely, Yves Klein, Max Ernst, Les Lalanne, and other experimental artists in the 1950s and 1960s.

As founder of the Nouveau réalisme ("New Realist") movement, Restany asked Saint Phalle to join this group of French artists upon seeing her performance; she would become the only female member of this group.

The extreme expressions of violence attracted media attention, catapulting Saint Phalle into the ranks of avant-garde artistic rebellion. The Tirs combined performance, body art, sculpture, and painting, in the artistic ferment of the 1960s. Saint Phalle began to present variations on this process in art museums and galleries, and recruited other artists to join in staged public "happenings", where some of her colleagues would also pull the trigger. At American performances, she would meet many other emerging artists, including Robert Rauschenberg, Ad Reinhardt, Frank Stella, and Ed Kienholz. She also organized indoors events at art galleries, where she would invite visitors to shoot at her assemblages.

Saint Phalle participated in Spoerri's "Edition MAT" (Multiplication d’Art Transformable) program of multiple artwork editions, supplying simpler versions of her Tirs works, with detailed instructions on how to shoot them with a .22 rifle. Saint Phalle carefully documented her artistic process in the Tirs with writing, still photos, and films. She would attach common readymade artifacts to a board, attach bags of colorful paint, whitewash everything, and then dip the assemblage into milk-white plaster. Once it had dried, the collection was ready for shooting by a purchaser.

In June 1961, Niki de Saint Phalle and Jean Tinguely joined Jasper Johns and Robert Rauschenberg in a concert-happening called Variations II, orchestrated by avant-garde American composer John Cage, and held at the American Embassy in Paris. While David Tudor played Cage compositions on the piano, the artists created their works of art on stage as the audience watched the proceedings.

In August 1961, Marcel Duchamp introduced Saint Phalle and Tinguely to Salvador Dalí, who invited them to create a life-sized exploding bull with fireworks (Toro de Fuego). This Homenage a Dalí ("Homage to Dalí") was wheeled out after the end of a traditional Spanish bullfight, in Figueras, Catalonia, Spain, and exploded in front of the audience.

In 1962, she had her first one-woman show in New York City, at the gallery run by Alexander Iolas. It included Homage to Le Facteur Cheval, a shooting gallery where visitors could fire on one of her Tirs installations. This began her long working relationship with the gallerist, eventually comprising at least 17 exhibitions of her work.

An exclusive 1962 open-air shooting event in the Malibu Hills above Los Angeles was attended by Hollywood celebrities, including Jane Fonda and John Houseman. Attendees from the art world included John Cage, Ed Ruscha, and Leo Castelli, while Ed Kienholz helped to manage the firearms.

In most of these public performances, Saint Phalle was impeccably dressed in a fashionable white pantsuit.

By 1963, she had taken the series to galleries in New York City and Los Angeles, inviting the public to participate in the shootings. In Los Angeles, she shot a large-scale King Kong assemblage she had constructed, paint-splattering the embedded sculpted faces of politicians such as John F Kennedy, Fidel Castro, and Charles De Gaulle, with Santa Claus and Donald Duck as well. This work would later be acquired by the Moderna Museet in Stockholm, and would mark her transition to a new series of fantastic monsters, animals, and female figures. Throughout her career, snakes, birds, and dragons would become recurring symbols in her artworks.

While in New York City, Saint Phalle and Tinguely stayed in the Hotel Chelsea in 1962, and again in 1964-1965. In 1963, the couple purchased an old hotel, called Auberge au Cheval Blanc ("White Horse Inn"), in Soisy-sur-Ecole, 44 kilometres (27 mi) southeast of Paris. It had previously been a hotel, a café, a cinema, and even a brothel, but the new owners converted it into artistic studios which they would share over the decades to come.

== Nanas (1964–1973) ==
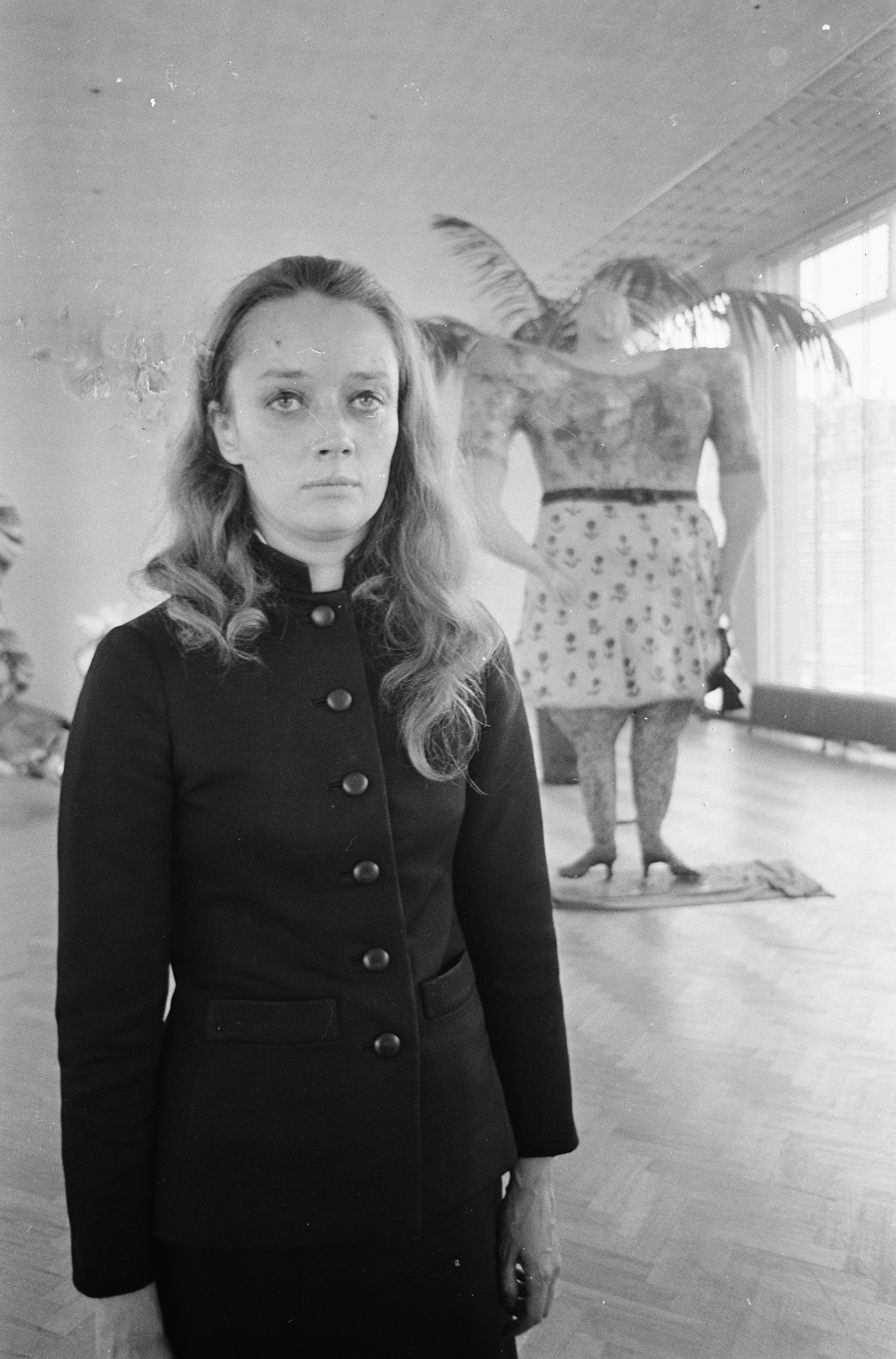
Saint Phalle in her first figurative survey museum exhibition Les Nanas au pouvoir, at Stedelijk Museum Amsterdam (1967)

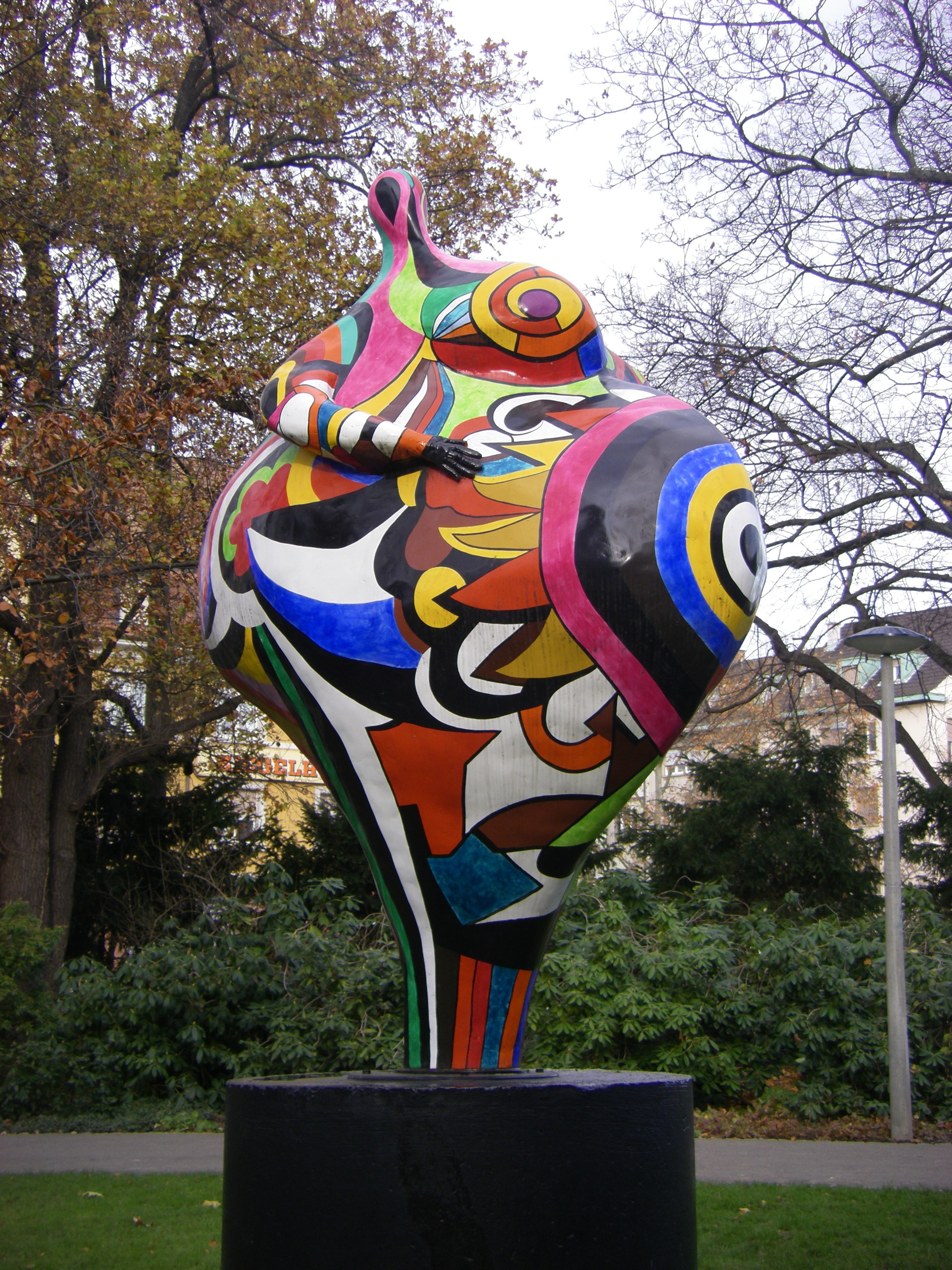
Gwendolyn 2 (1966/1990)

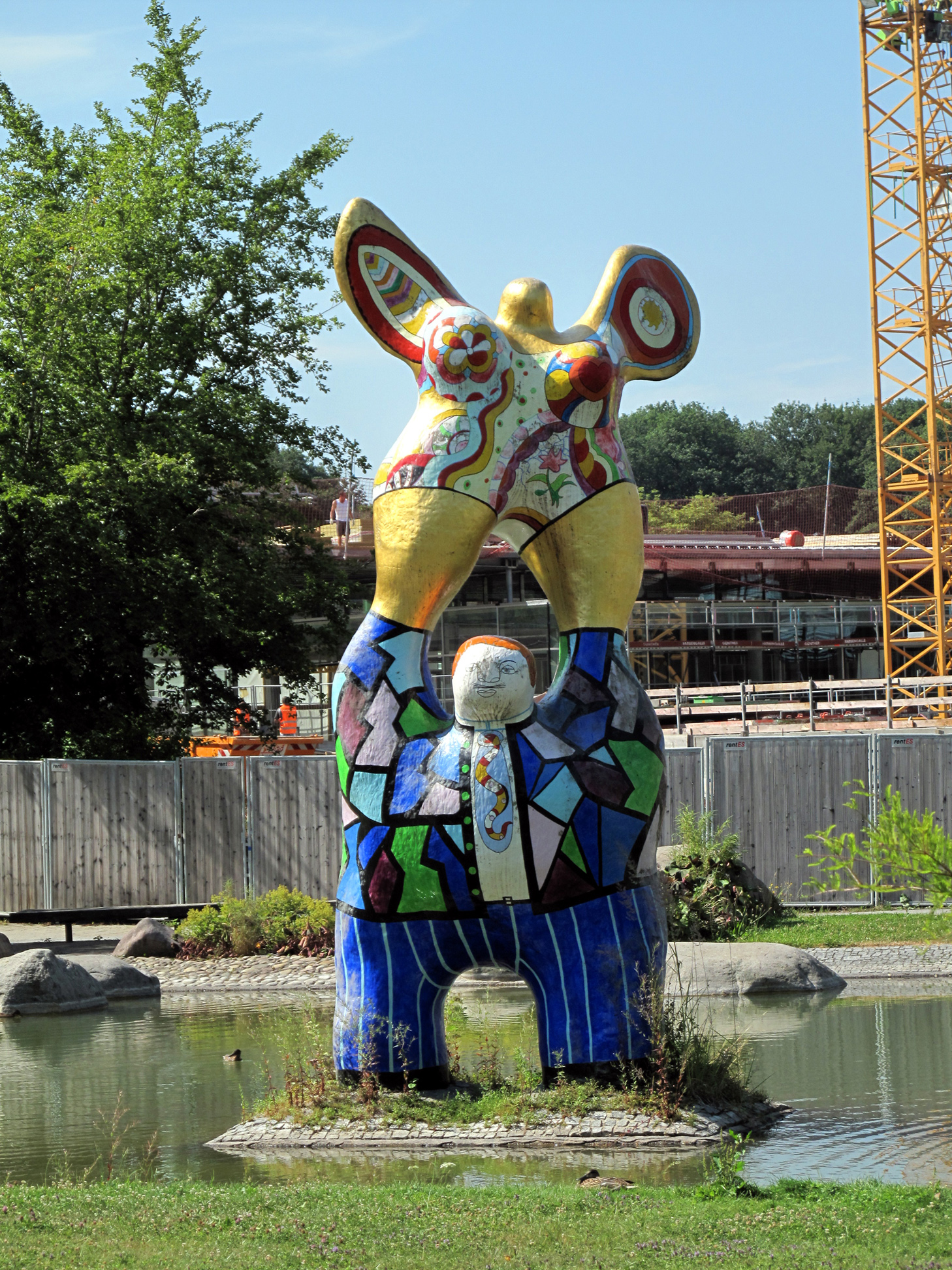
Le poète et sa muse ("Poet and his Muse", 1978)

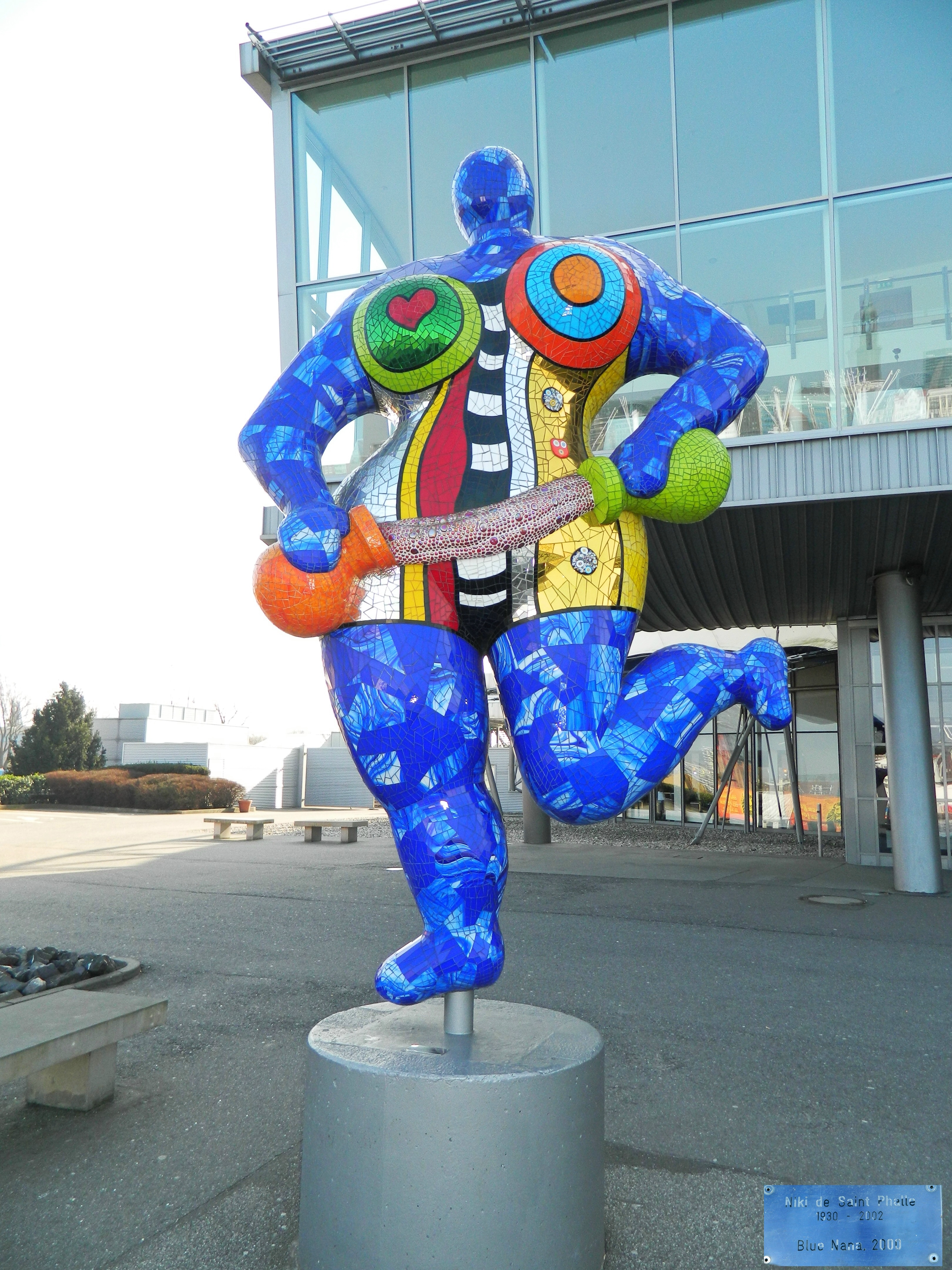
Blue Nana (2000)

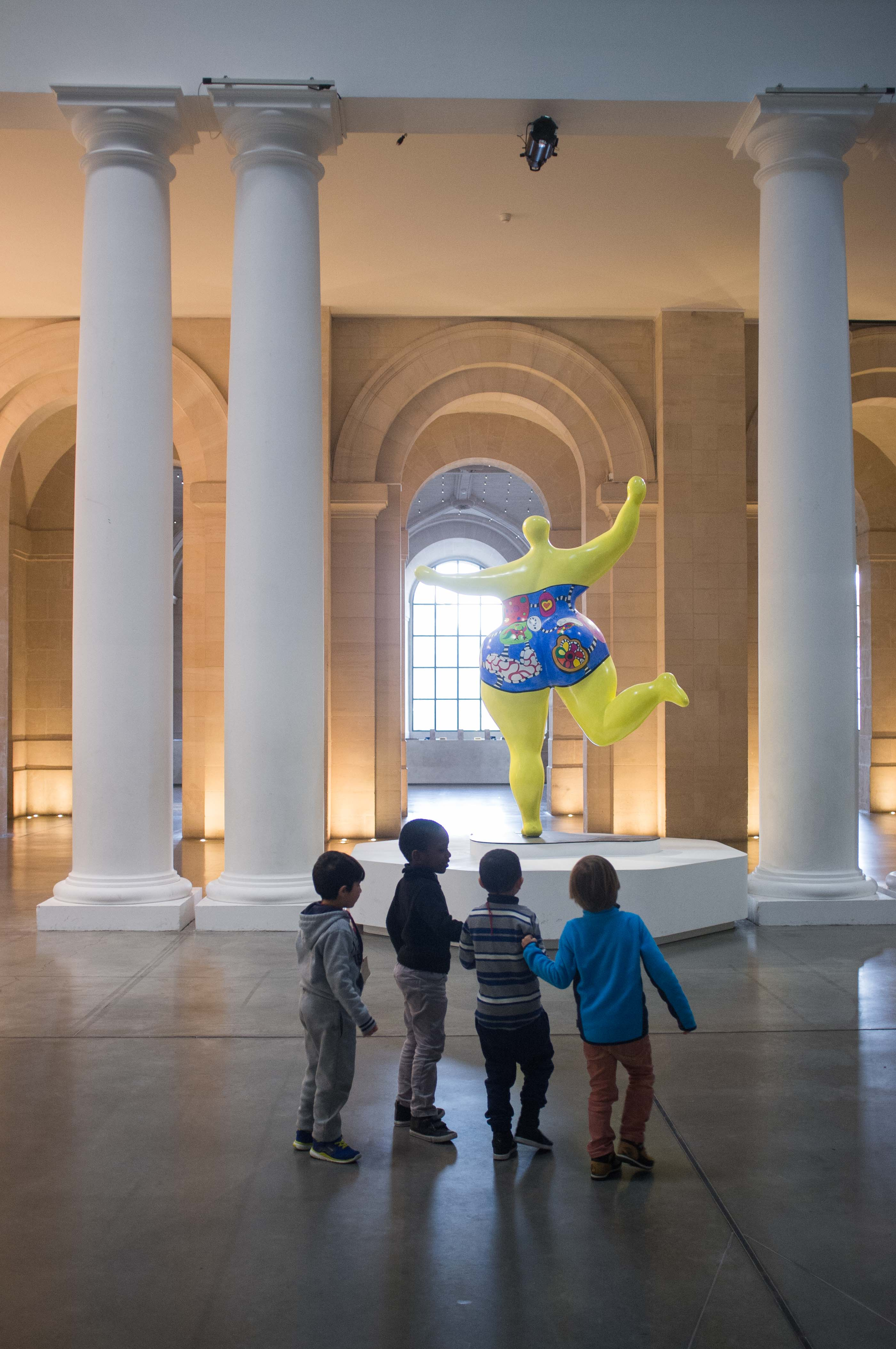
Nana Dansante (jaune) ("Dancing Nana (Yellow)")

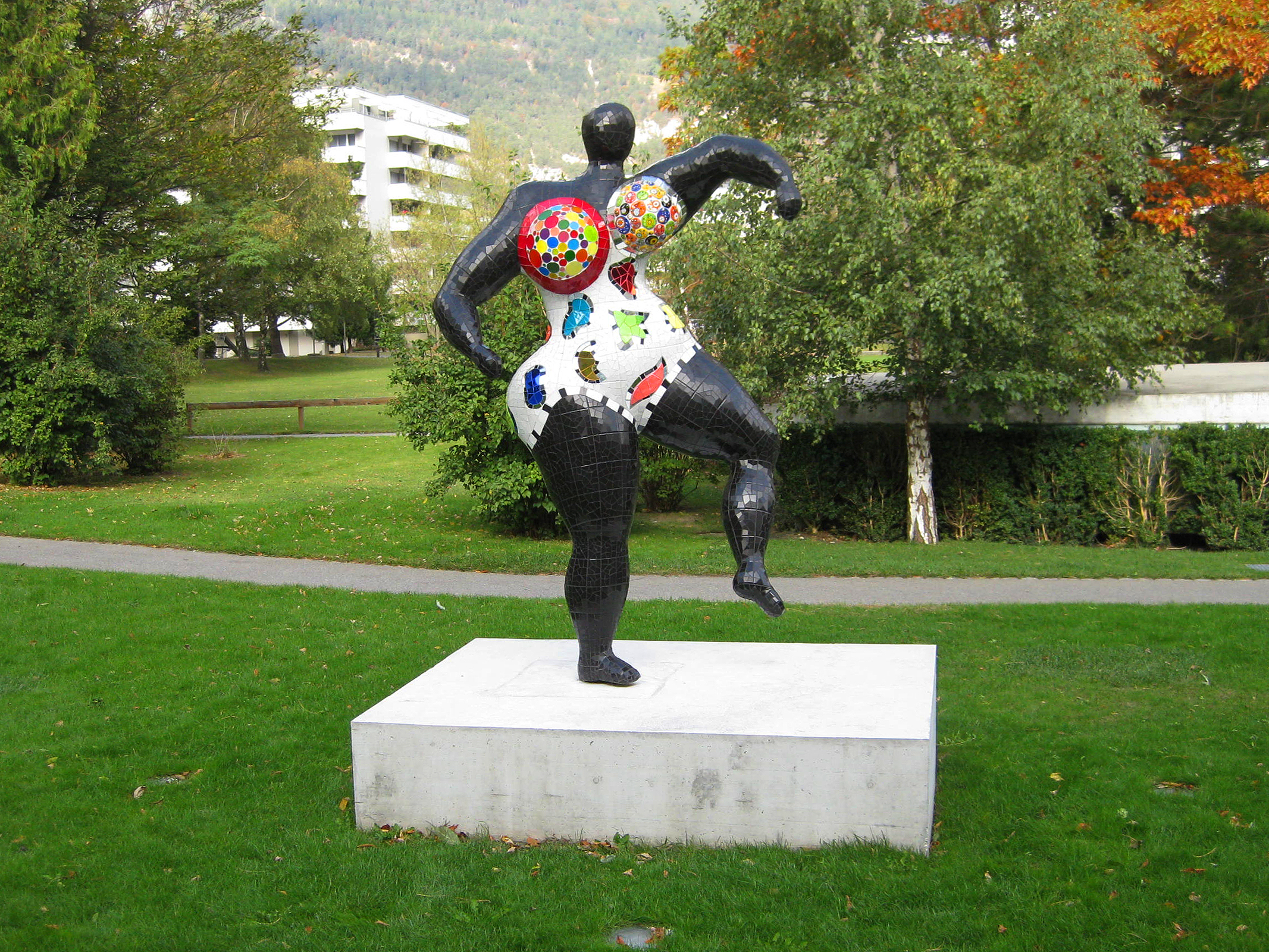
A black Nana

Saint Phalle next explored the various roles of women, in what would develop into her best-known and most prolific series of sculptures. She started making life-size dolls of women, such as brides and mothers giving birth, monsters, and large heads. Initially, they were made of soft materials, such as wool, cloth, and papier-mâché, but they soon evolved into plaster over a wire framework and plastic toys, some painted all white.

As the series developed into larger monumental works, Saint Phalle used composite fiberglass-reinforced polyester plastic (also known as FRP or GRP) decorated with multiple bright-colored acrylic or polyester paints. She also used polyurethane foam in many of her early sculptures. These innovative materials enabled the construction of colorful, large-scale sculptures with new ease and fluidity of form. Saint Phalle unknowingly used dangerous fabrication and painting processes that released airborne glass fibers and chemicals, including styrene, epoxy, and toxic solvents.

In 1963–64, she created a series of sculptures protesting stereotypical societal roles for women, as child bearers, devouring mothers, witches, and prostitutes. Some of her early artworks from this Bride period depicted ghostly, skeletal brides dressed in white, which have been compared to Miss Havisham, an ethereal character in Charles Dickens' novel Great Expectations.

Over time, these figures became more joyful, whimsical, colorful, and larger in scale. Inspired by a collaborative drawing with American artist Larry Rivers of his wife, her pregnant friend Clarice Price Rivers (1936–2024), Saint Phalle began to portray archetypal female figures with a more optimistic view of the position of women in society. Gwendoline (1965) was the first major sculpture in what would become a lifetime series of these works.

The newer figures took on ecstatic dance poses and even acrobatic positions, such as handstands and cartwheels. Saint Phalle's light-hearted figures have been compared to the joyful dancers of Matisse and the sturdy female figures by Gaston Lachaise, Aristide Maillol, and Rodin.

By 1965, she was calling her artistic expressions of the proverbial everywoman Nanas, after a French slang word that is roughly equivalent to "broad", or "chick". The term also recalls the childish French taunt nananère.

The first of these freely posed forms, made of papier-mâché, yarn, and cloth, was exhibited at the Alexander Iolas Gallery in Paris in September 1965. During this show, she joined a type of tombola raffle organized by the Artist's Club of New York, whereby artworks were randomly left in coin-operated luggage lockers at Pennsylvania Station, and keys were offered for $10 each.

For this show, Iolas also published Saint Phalle's first artist book that included her handwritten text in combination with her drawings of Bananas. Encouraged by Iolas, she started a highly productive output of graphics work that accompanied her exhibitions, which included silk-screened prints, posters, books, and writings. In the years to come, she would publish multiple hand-lettered books, profusely illustrated with colorful drawings and diagrams, on topics such as AIDS prevention and various periods in her life story.

In 1966, Saint Phalle collaborated with Jean Tinguely and Per Olof Ultvedt on a temporary indoor sculpture installation, Hon – en katedral (which means "She-a-Cathedral" in Swedish), filling a large temporary gallery in the Moderna Museet, in Stockholm, Sweden. During construction, Saint Phalle recruited Swiss art student Rico Weber, who had been working as a dishwasher in the museum restaurant (in the following years, he would become a vital assistant and collaborator for both Saint Phalle and Tinguely). A team of 8 people worked strenuously for 40 days, first building a frame using metal rebar, covering it with chicken wire, sheathing it with fabric attached with smelly animal glue, and then painting the inside of the enclosure black, and painting the outside in bright colors. The final structure was 82 feet (25 m) long and 30 feet (9.1 m) wide, weighing around 6 tonnes (6,000 kg). In the tabloid-sized newsprint catalog published for the show, Saint Phalle included a diagram showing the artistic influences on her design, which included Simon Rodia's Watts Towers, Ferdinand Cheval's Le Palais Idéal, and the architecture of Antoni Gaudi.

The outer form was a giant, reclining sculpture of a pregnant woman (a Nana), whose voluminous interior could be entered through a door-sized vaginal opening between her legs. Written on one of Hon's massive thighs was the motto Honi soit qui mal y pense ("May he be shamed who thinks badly of it"). Inside the massive sculpture were a 12-seat cinema theater, a milk bar inside a breast, a fish pond, and a brain built by Tinguely, with moving mechanical parts. In addition, the sprawling Nana contained a coin telephone, a love-seat sofa, a museum of fake paintings, a sandwich vending machine, an art installation by Ultvedt, and a playground slide for children.

After an initial shocked silence, the installation elicited extensive public commentary in magazines and newspapers throughout the world, raising awareness of the Moderna Museet. Over 100,000 visitors crowded in to experience the immersive environment, including many children. At the end of 3 months, the entire temporary setup was demolished and removed, except for the head, which was preserved by the museum in its permanent collection. Some small fragments were attached to limited-edition exhibition catalogs and sold as mementos.

Around this time, Saint Phalle also designed stage sets and costumes for theatrical productions: Éloge de La Folie ("Praise of the Madness", 1966), a ballet by Roland Petit; an adaptation of the Aristophanes play Lysistrata (1966); and a German-language play she co-wrote with Rainer von Diez titled ICH (All About Me) (1968). Large fixed or moveable Nana figures were prominent in several of these productions.

In 1967, Saint Phalle began working with polyester resin, a material which could be shaped easily but would transform into a hard, smooth, weather-resistant surface. This new technology enabled her to construct large, fantastical figures for display outdoors in public spaces and parks. The material is reasonably durable outdoors (similar materials are used for boats and car bodies), although decades of weather exposure can eventually cause deterioration, requiring specialized art conservation measures.

In August 1967, the Stedelijk Museum in Amsterdam opened Saint Phalle's first retrospective exhibition, Les Nanas au pouvoir ("Nana Power"). For the show, Niki created her first "Nana Dream House" and "Nana Fountain", and also showed plans for her first "Nana Town".

In 1967, she exhibited Le Paradis Fantastique ("The Fantastic Paradise"), a collaborative grouping of nine of her sculptures with six machines built by Tinguely, on the rooftop terrace of the 8-level French Pavilion at Expo 67 in Montreal. The composition was originally conceived of as an attack by Tinguely's dark mechanical constructions upon Saint Phalle's brightly colored animals and female figures, a kind of "amorous warfare".

Although the French Pavilion itself was popular, most visitors did not see the rooftop terrace where the sculptures were installed. In 1968, the sculptures were re-displayed at the Albright-Knox Gallery in Buffalo, New York, and then for a year in New York City's Central Park. In 1971, some of the artworks were purchased by the Moderna Museet, and permanently installed nearby in an outdoor sculpture garden on Skeppsholmen, an island in central Stockholm.

In 1968, she first disclosed that she had developed respiratory problems from exposure to dust and fumes in making her artwork.

Starting in 1968, Saint Phalle sold Nana inflatable pool toys, which appeared in the April 15, 1968, issue of Vogue magazine. She ignored complaints from art critics, focusing on raising money for her future monumental projects. In the coming years, she would face more criticism for over-commercializing and popularizing her artwork, but she raised significant funding that enabled her to finance several ambitious projects on her own. Her production of smaller, lower-cost objects also placed her art within reach of more supporters of her causes. During her career, she produced clothing, jewelry, perfume, glass or porcelain figures, furniture, and craft items, many with a Nana theme.

From 1969 to 1971, she worked on her first full-scale architecture project, three small sculptural houses commissioned by Rainer von Diez in southern France, which she called Le Rêve de l'oiseau ("The Dream of the Bird"). The project was a collaboration with him and Jean Tinguely, and a forerunner of her later Tarot Garden project.

In 1969, she joined several other artists under the lead of Tinguely, starting work on Le Cyclop ("Cyclops", also known as La Tête, "The Head", or le Monstre dans la forêt, "the Monster in the forest"), in Milly-la-Forêt, near Paris. Collaborators included Daniel Spoerri, Bernhard Luginbuhl, and Eva Aeppli. Eventually, 15 different people worked on the project, which would not be considered finished until 1994.

In 1969, in an interview on television in her studio, she shared her views about the place of women in politics and said, "I think women could administer this world much better. If Black power and women power would get together, they would take over everything. That's the solution. A new world of joy."

In November 1970, as part of an artists' reunion celebrating the 10th anniversary of the founding of the Nouveaux Réalistes, Saint Phalle shot at an altar assemblage.

On 13 July 1971, Saint Phalle and Tinguely legally married, perhaps for tax savings, as Saint Phalle thus became a Swiss citizen. Their marriage did give the two artists mutual control over each other's artistic estate if one of them should die. That same year, she designed her first pieces of jewelry.

In 1972, she installed Golem (Niki de Saint Phalle), commissioned by the then mayor Teddy Kollek, at a children's playground in the Kiryat Hayovel neighborhood of Jerusalem. It is a giant monster with three red tongues protruding from its mouth, which serve as playground slides. This project was the first time she used the shotcrete method of spraying concrete over a metal framework to produce large structures; this method would be used in her further major projects.

Starting in 1972, she engaged Robert Haligon ("Fabricant de Plastiques d’Art") to help fabricate her large-scale sculptures, as well as various editions of artworks. This collaboration would continue for 25 years, including all four of his children, notably Gérard, who would take the lead in later years. The collaboration would produce approximately 3,000 sculptures, ranging from monumental outdoors pieces to small multiple editions. Saint Phalle personally trained daughter Marie Haligon to paint her multiple edition sculptures, following a master artist's prototype. Initially, the artist preferred a matte paint finish, shunning shiny surfaces. However, she was forced to adopt glossy surface finishes to attain improved durability of the paints on her outdoors sculptures. Over time, she embraced this glossy visual effect, and began using mirrors and polished stones to surface her artworks.

In 1972, Saint Phalle shot footage for her surreal horror film Daddy, about a deeply troubled father-daughter love-hate relationship. The filming was done in a rented castle near Grasse in southeastern France in association with filmmaker Peter Whitehead. In November, the film was shown in London. The following January, she produced a new version of the film, with additional scenes in Soisy and New York, and an expanded cast. The revised version premiered at Lincoln Center for the 11th New York Film Festival in April. She was also commissioned to design the cover of the program for the festival.

In 1973, Saint Phalle worked with Tinguely and Rico Weber on a commission from Roger and Fabienne Nellens to build a playhouse in the garden of their home in seaside Knokke-le-Zoute, Belgium. The Le Dragon they built was a substantial structure, 21 feet (6.4 m) high and 110 feet (34 m) long, made using techniques derived from the earlier Le Rêve de l'oiseau and Golem projects. The fantastical building would eventually include a kitchen, bathroom, toilet, heating system, and bedroom, at an estimated cost of $30,000 to $40,000. The exterior was decorated with bright paintings, including ones done by Roger Nellens and the Formula 1 race-car driver Jacky Ickx. Similar to the Golem project the previous year, a long tongue formed an exterior slide from the upper level.

In 1987, graffiti artist Keith Haring would live in Le Dragon while working on a mural commissioned by Roger Nellens at nearby Knokke Casino, and would return for at least three summers. With Saint Phalle's enthusiastic consent, he would paint a long fresco along an interior stairway wall. Eventually, the building would be designated a Monument Historique of Belgium, though it would remain private property.

Saint Phalle continued to create Nanas for the rest of her life, but would soon focus her attention on a comprehensive project in Italy.

Le Paradis Fantastique (1967–1971)

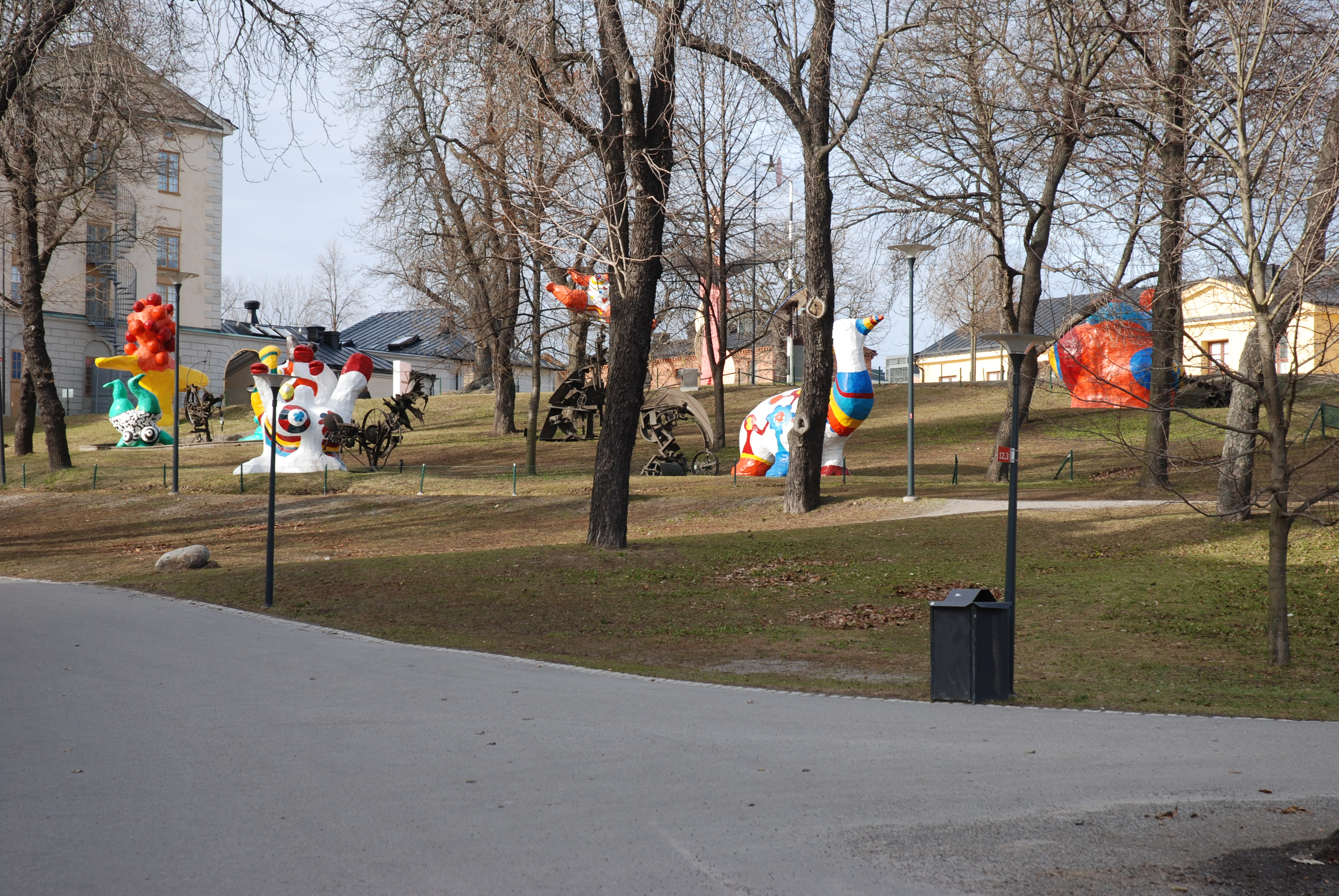

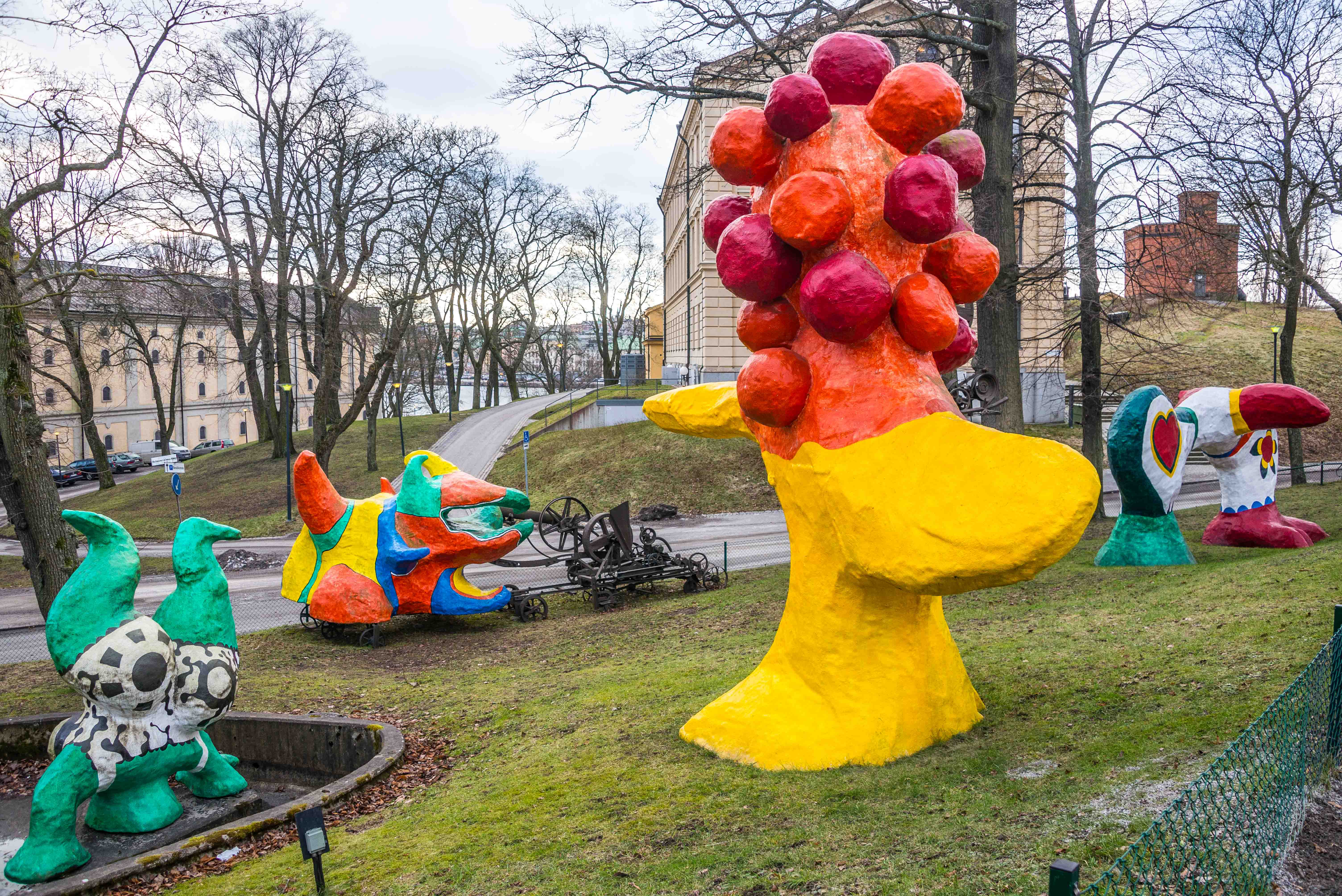

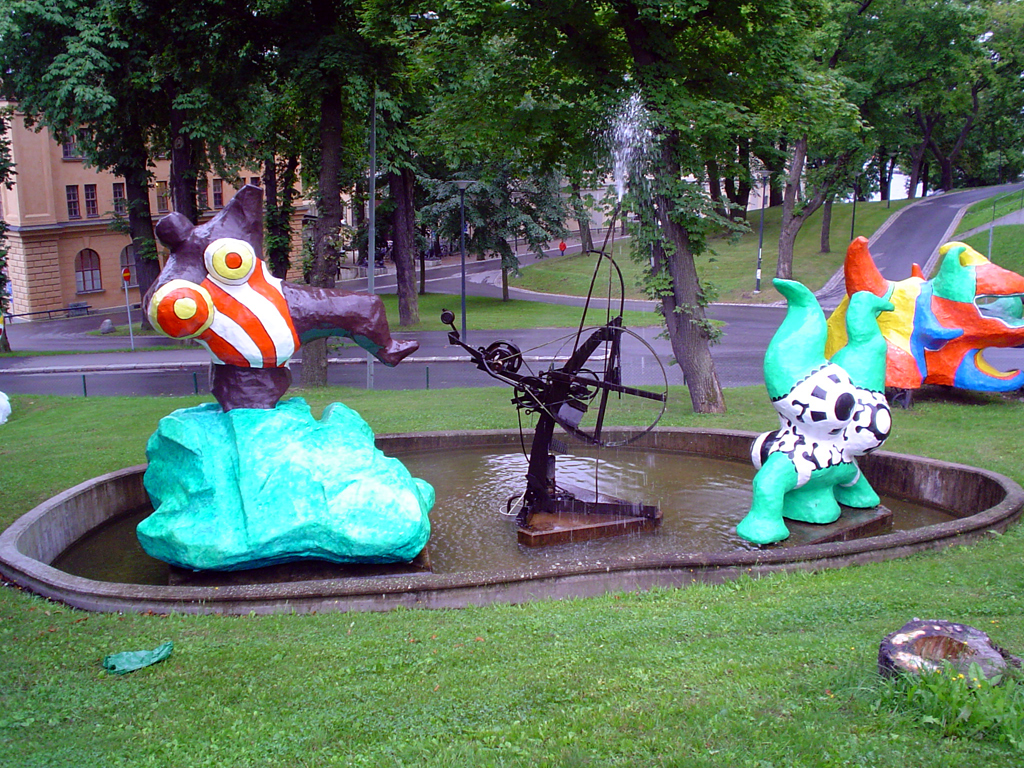

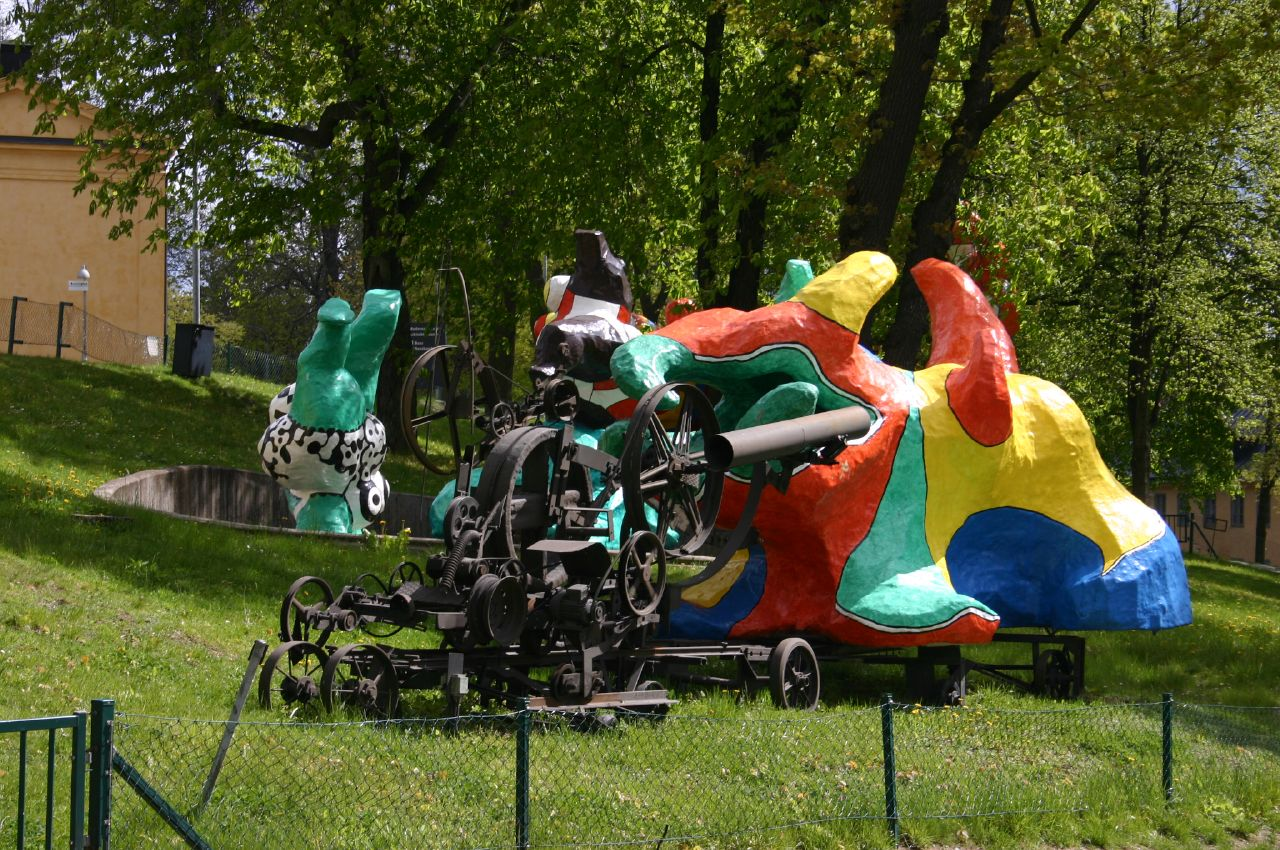

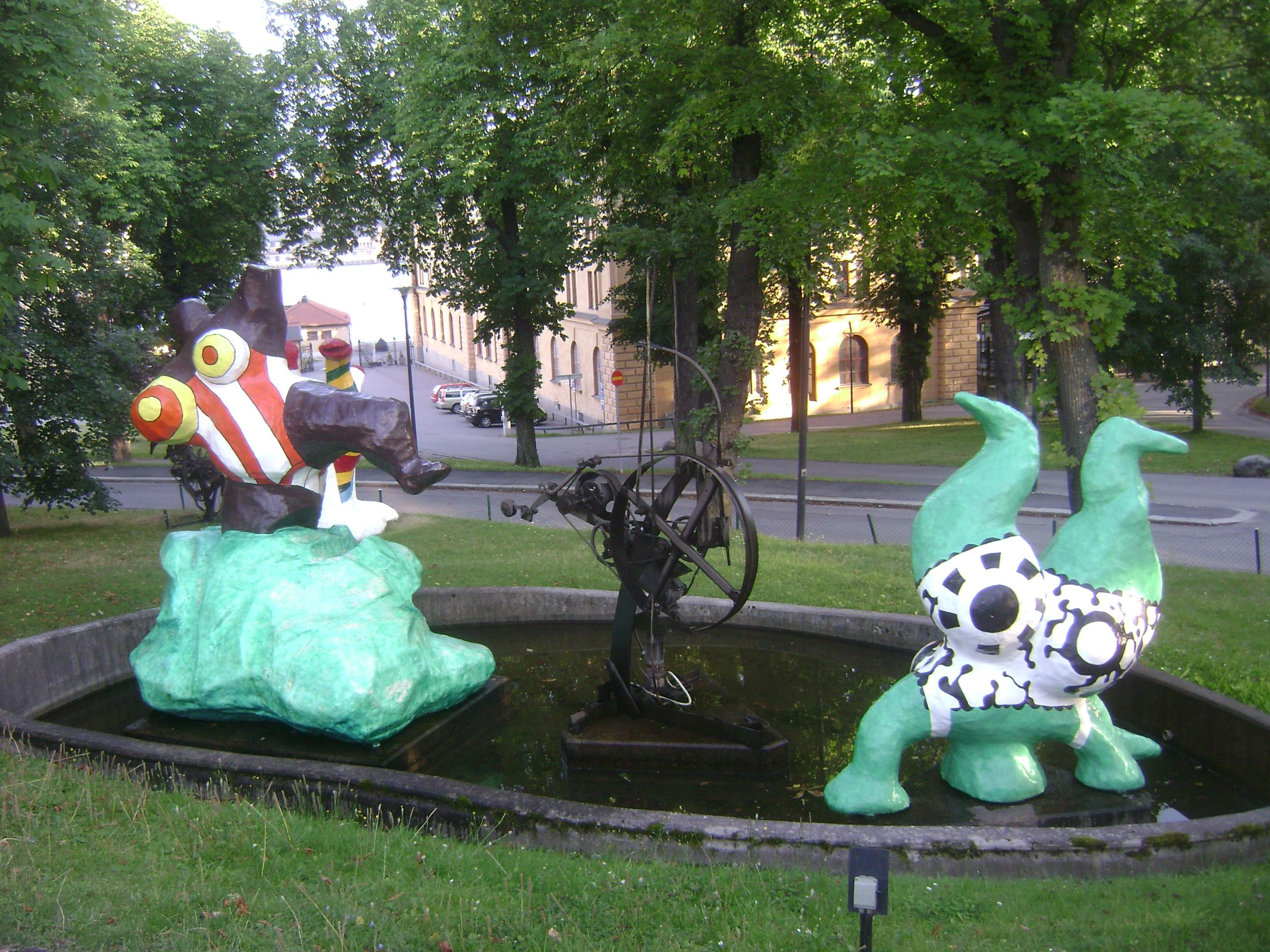

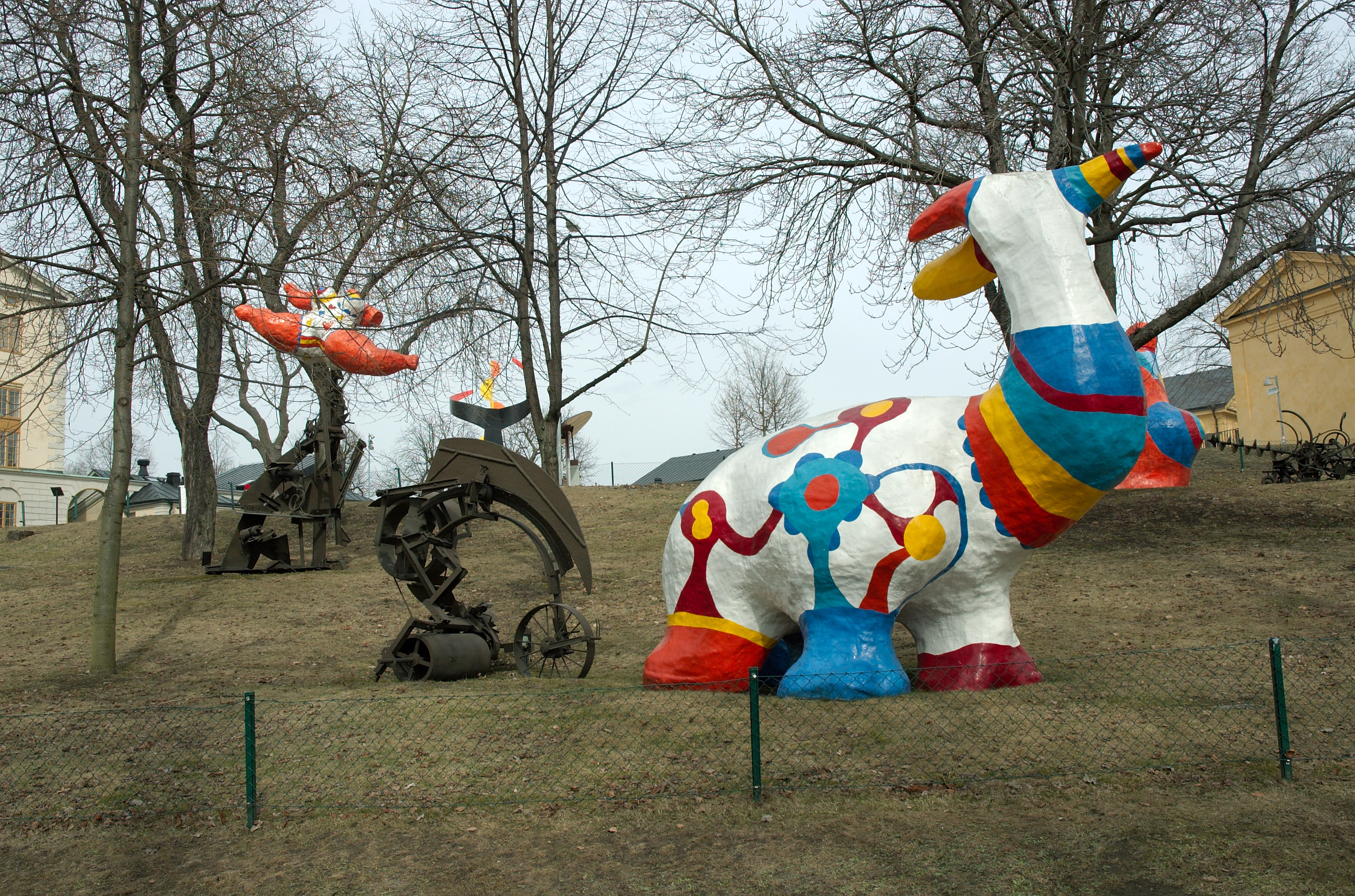

== Tarot Garden (1974–1998) ==
The Tarot Garden is not just my garden. It is also the garden of all those who helped me make it. I am the Architect of the garden. I imposed my vision because I could not do otherwise.

The garden was made with difficulties, wild enthusiasm, obsession, and most of all faith. Nothing could have stopped me.

As in all fairy tales, before finding the treasure, I met on my path dragons, sorcerers, magicians, and the Angel of Temperance.

—Niki de Saint Phalle

In 1955, Saint Phalle had visited Antoni Gaudí's Parc Güell in Barcelona, Spain, which inspired her to use diverse materials and found objects as essential elements in her art. Another influence was the Parco dei Mostri in Bomarzo, in the Lazio region of Italy. In the late 1950s, she and Jean Tinguely had visited Le Palais Idéal built by Ferdinand Cheval (known as Le Facteur Cheval) in Hauterives, France, as well as Simon Rodia's Watts Towers in Los Angeles in the early 1960s. Both these latter locations were examples of fantastical outsider art and architecture built by ordinary working men of modest means but an expansive vision. Saint Phalle decided that she wanted to make something similar: a magnificent sculpture garden, but created by a woman.

The founding sponsors for her ambitious project were members of the Italian Agnelli family. In 1974, Saint Phalle became ill with a pulmonary abscess from her work with polyester and was hospitalized in Arizona. She then recuperated in St. Moritz, Switzerland. She reconnected with Marella Agnelli, a friend from the 1950s in New York, and told Agnelli about her ideas for a fantasy garden. In 1978, Agnelli's brothers Carlo and Nicola Caracciolo offered a parcel of their land in Tuscany for the garden's site.

In 1974, Saint Phalle created a trio of monumental Nanas installed next to the River Leine in Hanover, Germany. City leaders were initially inundated with over 20,000 letters of complaint, but eventually the figures were affectionately nicknamed "Sophie", "Charlotte", and "Caroline" in honor of three of the city's historical women. The dispute between supporters and opponents of the statues was resolved by a tug-of-war contest.

In 1975, Saint Phalle wrote the screenplay for Un rêve plus long que la nuit ("A Dream Longer Than the Night", later also called Camélia et le Dragon), and she recruited many of her artist friends to help make it into a film, a phantasmagorical tale of dragons, monsters, and adolescence. A young girl is held captive by a dragon, manages to escape, and must explore Sept Portes du Mystère ("Seven Doors of Mystery") to find love. Saint Phalle's daughter Laura was the lead character in the film, appearing with Saint Phalle, Jean Tinguely, and other artist friends; Peter Whitehead composed the music. For the filming, she designed several pieces of furniture, which were later displayed on the facade of the Palais des Beaux-Arts in Brussels. From 1968 to 1988, she also worked on Last Night I Had a Dream, a sculptural relief painting that included many elements from her earlier life and dreams.

In 1976, she retreated to the Swiss Alps to refine her plans for the sculpture park. In 1977 Ricardo Menon, an Argentinian, became her assistant; he would work closely with her until 1986.

In 1977, she worked with the English writer Constantin Mulgrave to design sets for The Traveling Companion, based on a Hans Christian Andersen fairy tale, but the project was never completed. She and Mulgrave lived together for around four years, but Tinguely remained a continually reappearing presence in her life.

In 1977, she also visited Mexico and New Mexico, in search of more extensive artistic inspirations.

In 1978, Saint Phalle started to lay out her sculpture garden in an abandoned quarry in Garavicchio, Tuscany, about 100 kilometres (62 mi) north-west of Rome near the west coast of the Italian peninsula. The following year, sites were cleared, and foundations were established.

In 1979, she produced the first of what would become a new series of sculptures, the Skinnies. These were flat, planar, see-through outlines of heads and figures, highlighted by patches of color. In some ways, they resembled her colorful sketches and drawings but scaled up to monumental size. The series also symbolized Saint Phalle's struggles against emphysema and illness. She continued to produce her Nanas in addition to her new style of sculpture, and both styles of figures would appear in her Tarot Garden project.

In 1980, Saint Phalle and her team began to build the first architectural sculpture in the garden. As the project progressed, Saint Phalle started taking lessons in the Italian language, to better communicate with local workers. The second crew member she hired was Ugo Celletti, a 50-year-old part-time postal delivery man, who discovered a love for mosaic work on the project. He would work on the project for 36 years and recruit his nephews to join in; some family members are still involved in maintaining the site.

She invited artist friends from Argentina, Scotland, Holland, and France to help work on the sculptures. Over time, Saint Phalle worked with dozens of people, including architects, ceramicists, ironworkers, bricklayers, painters, and mosaic artists. The materials used in the Tarot Garden project would include steel, iron, cement, polyester, ceramic, mosaic glass, mirrors, and polished stones (which she called "M&M's").

The structure of the more massive sculptures was very similar to the temporary Hon installation at the Moderna Museet in 1966, but this time the artworks were outdoors and needed to withstand the long-term weathering effects of sun and rain. The basic shape of the sculptures was established with frameworks made of welded steel rebar. A second layer of lighter-gauge steel reinforcement bars was added, followed by two layers of expanded metal. A specialist firm was then brought in to spray shotcrete onto the structure. A layer of tar for waterproofing and a final layer of white cement produced a sturdy, hollow structure ready for decoration.

In 1980, she also began selling a series of polyester snake chairs, vases, and lamps. That year, she recorded her first attack of rheumatoid arthritis, a painful disease affecting the joints of the skeleton.

In 1980–1981, she designed a colorful paint scheme for a Piper Aerostar 602 P twin-engine airplane, which participated in the first trans-Atlantic race sponsored by the Peter Stuyvesant Foundation of Amsterdam. As an act of playful rebellion against the cigarette manufacturer sponsor, she added a "No Smoking" sign visible on the belly of the plane (she was allergic to tobacco smoke).

In 1981, Saint Phalle rented a small house near the Tarot Garden and hired young people from Garavicchio to help with the construction of the garden. Jean Tinguely led a Swiss team, comprising Seppi Imhoff and Rico Weber, and started welding the frames of the sculptures. The following year, Dutch artist Doc Winsen (also called "Dok van Winsen") took up the welding operations.

In 1982, Saint Phalle developed and marketed an eponymous perfume, using the proceeds to help finance her project. The perfume bottle top featured a small sculpture of two intertwined snakes, one golden and the other brightly multicolored. This was one of the first of what came to be called celebrity perfumes, using fame and name recognition to sell scented products. She may have raised as much as a third of the funds she needed for the garden in this way. She actively solicited funding from friends and acquaintances, as well as by selling her artworks.

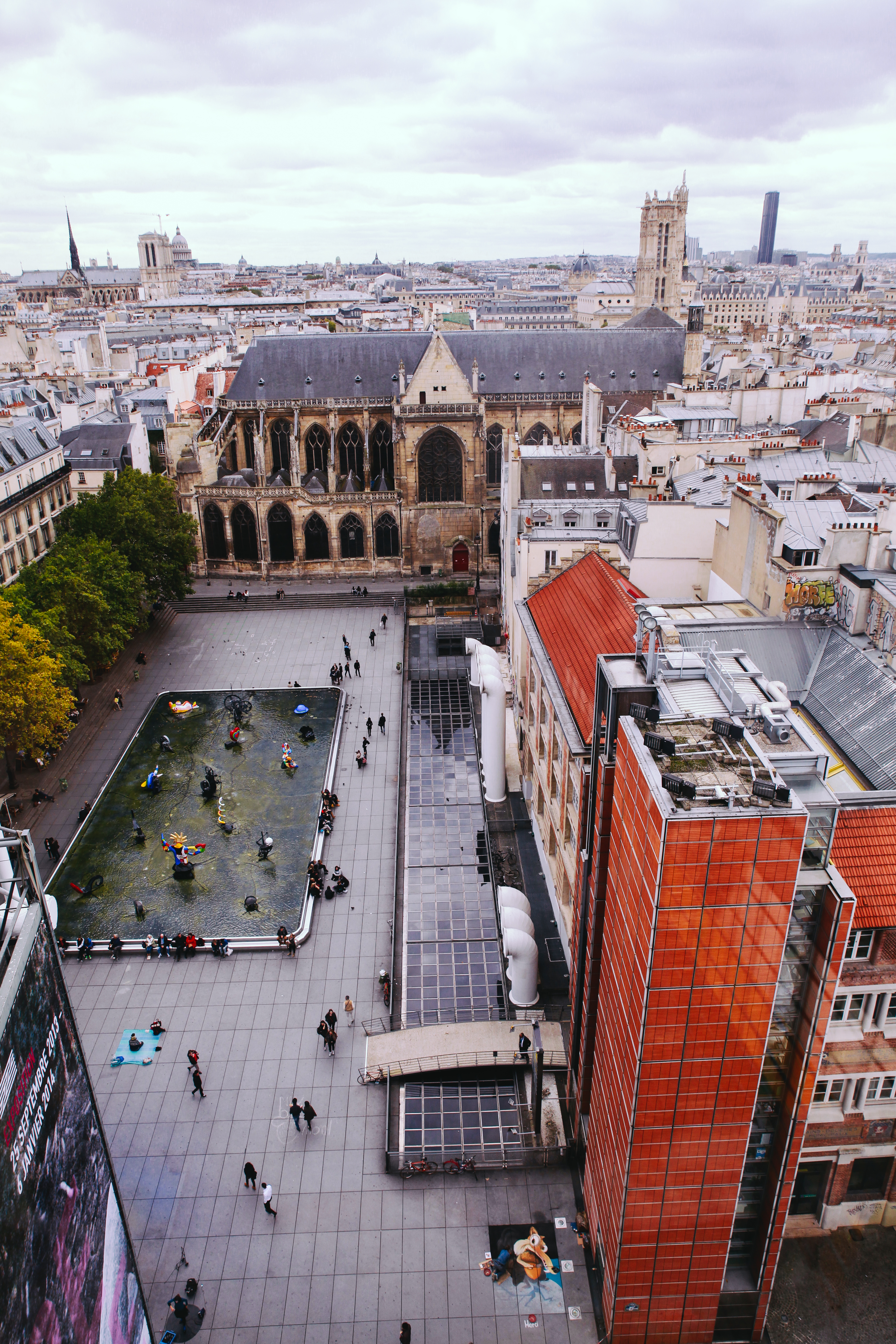
Distant aerial view of Stravinsky Fountain and Centre Georges Pompidou in 2013

In August 1982, Saint Phalle was honored at the Street Festival of the Arts in New York City. Later that year, Saint Phalle collaborated with Tinguely to produce the Stravinsky Fountain, a 15-piece sculptural fountain with moving elements, located in Igor Stravinsky Square next to the Centre Georges Pompidou in Paris. Because of its prominent location in Paris, it would become one of the best-known collaborations between the two artists.

From 1983 until 1988, when on site, Saint Phalle lived in a small apartment built into The Empress, a house-sized sphinx-like sculpture in the garden. On the second level, her bedroom was inside one breast, and her kitchen was inside the other one. Each of these two rooms had a single recessed circular window, appearing as an inverted nipple when viewed from the outside. In 2000, she would recall: "At last, my lifelong wish to live inside a sculpture was going to be granted: a space entirely made out of undulating curves ... I wanted to invent a new mother, a mother goddess, and be reborn within its form ... I would sleep in one breast. In the other, I would put my kitchen".

The ground floor contained a large mirrored space with a mirrored dining table where she would serve lunch to workers and artists, beneath a chandelier Tinguely had made with a cow skull. She used this motherly role to help reinforce her authority in directing the team of men she needed to help build her project. Eventually, she would grow tired of the cramped space "in the womb of her mother", and after 1988 would move into a New-York-loft-style studio which she had built for herself underground at the site. Her assistant, Ricardo Menon, would live in the Tower of Babel structure while on site, working closely with Saint Phalle and caring for her during crippling arthritis flareups.

Around 1983, Saint Phalle decided to cover her Tarot Garden sculptures primarily in durable ceramic colored tiles, adding shards of mirrors and glass, and polished stones. Menon helped her recruit Venera Finocchiaro, a ceramics teacher from Rome; she taught local women new techniques for molding ceramic pieces to curved surfaces and installed on-site ovens to finish the pieces. Starting in 1985, Jean Tinguely added motorized and stationary steel sculptures and fountains to the project. Robert Haligon and his sons did much of the work, which involved polyester resins. Saint Phalle asked Pierre Marie Lejeune to create a cement path, which he inscribed with hieroglyphs, other signs and symbols, and text. During this period, Saint Phalle dedicated almost all of her time to living and working in the garden.

In 1986, Menon left to attend a drama school in Paris, but kept secret from Saint Phalle that he had contracted AIDS. While there, he recruited fellow Argentinian Marcelo Zitelli to work for Saint Phalle as a gardener, but he in turn became her assistant for other work as well, helping her fabricate sculptures for at least the next decade.

The same year, Saint Phalle took some time to collaborate with Silvio Barandun (a German medical professor of immunology) in writing and illustrating her book AIDS: You Can’t Catch It Holding Hands, intended for students in middle school or high school. It was first published in San Francisco in English, then later translated into five different languages; 70,000 copies were sold or given to medical institutions and schools. The book was considered influential in early efforts supporting public health education about the disease.

From 1987 to 1993, Saint Phalle spent more of her time in Paris, where she developed many of the smaller sculptures for the garden. From time to time, she would organize gallery shows of her art, including maquettes of her more significant works, to raise funds for the garden project. Saint Phalle also worked on establishing a permanent legal structure for the preservation and maintenance of the garden.

In 1988, Saint Phalle participated in a worldwide touring exhibition of kites. Her contribution was a gigantic kite inspired by her oiseau amoureux ("amorous bird") series of sculptures.

In 1992–1993, corrective maintenance on the Tarot Garden sculptures was performed, using new glues and silicones to attach mirrors and glass elements more securely, to withstand weathering and the touch of many visitors' hands. Starting in 2021, a similar restoration process of re-attaching mirrors was ongoing with Le Cyclop, located in Milly-la-Forêt, near Paris.

The Tarot Garden was under development for almost 30 years, and $5 million (roughly $11 million in 2016 dollars) was spent to construct it. The Foundation of the Tarot Garden was constituted in 1997 (and would attain official juridical status in 2002), and the garden officially opened to the public on 15 May 1998. The completed garden (called il Giardino dei Tarocchi in Italian, and le Jardin des Tarots in French) now contains sculptures and architectural sculptures representing the 22 cards of Major Arcana found in the Tarot deck of cards, plus other smaller artworks. The site covers around 2 hectares (4.9 acres) on the southern slope of the hill of Garavicchio, in Capalbio. The tallest sculptures are about 15 metres (49 ft) high.

Saint Phalle's friend, architect Mario Botta, built a fortress-like protective wall and a porthole-shaped gateway at the entrance to the garden, marking a distinctive separation from the outside world. The entry structure also houses a ticket office, a gift shop, and restrooms for visitors. Within the park, there are fountains, courtyards, a multilevel tower, and many larger-than-life mythical creatures. Saint Phalle designed a brochure containing a map and other information for visitors to the garden, which is open seasonally.

Tarot Garden

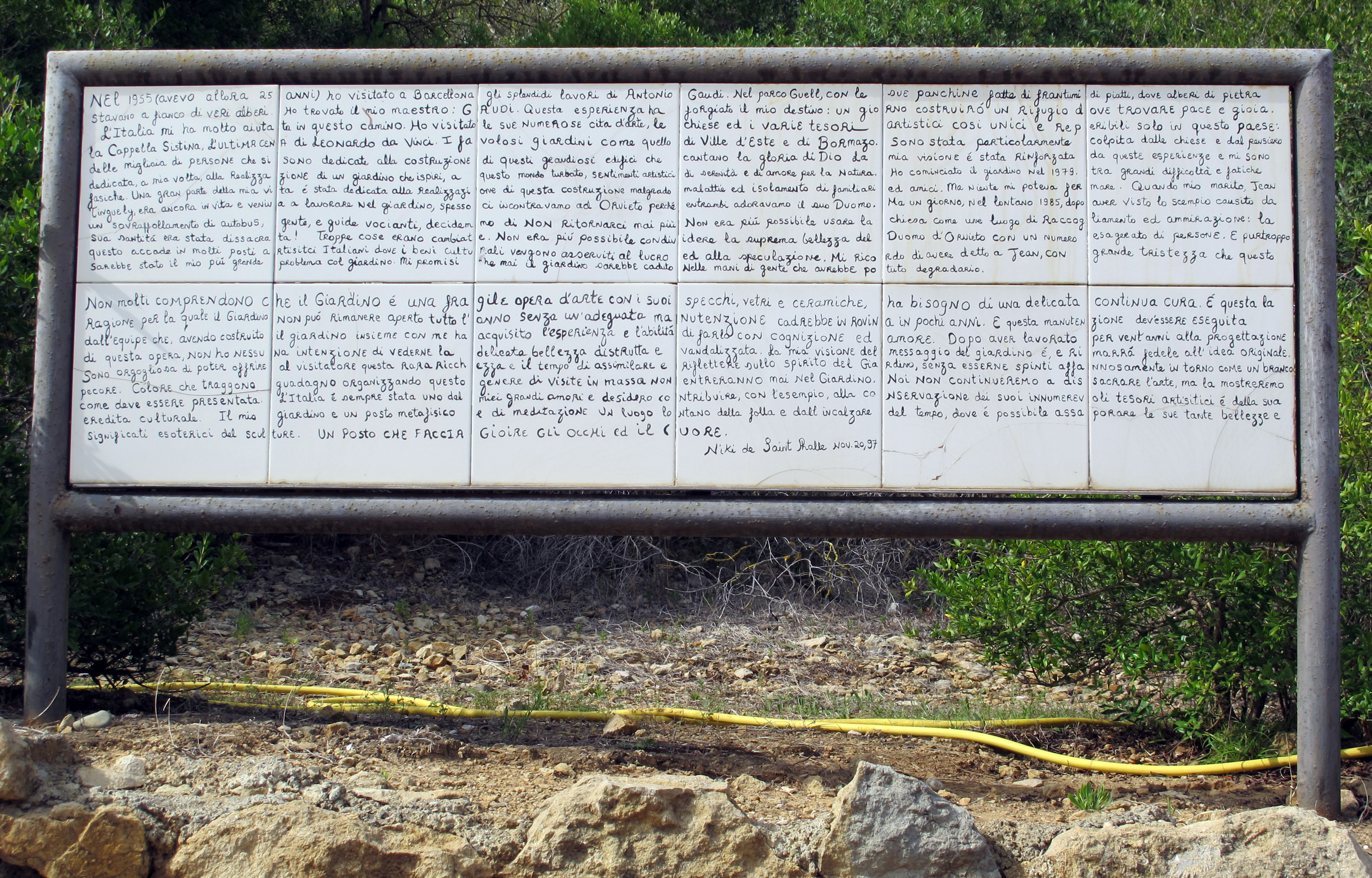
Sign at entrance

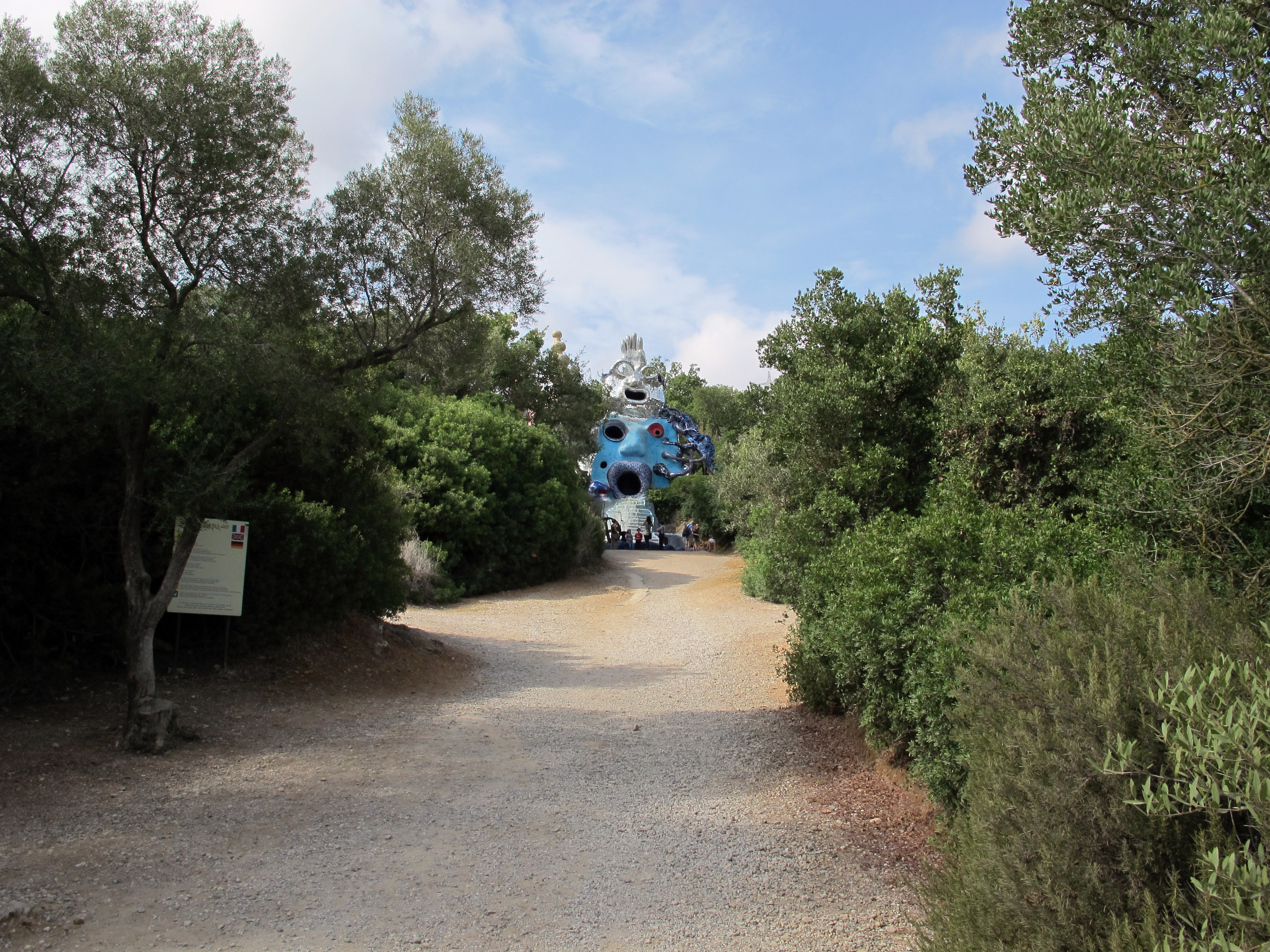
View into entrance

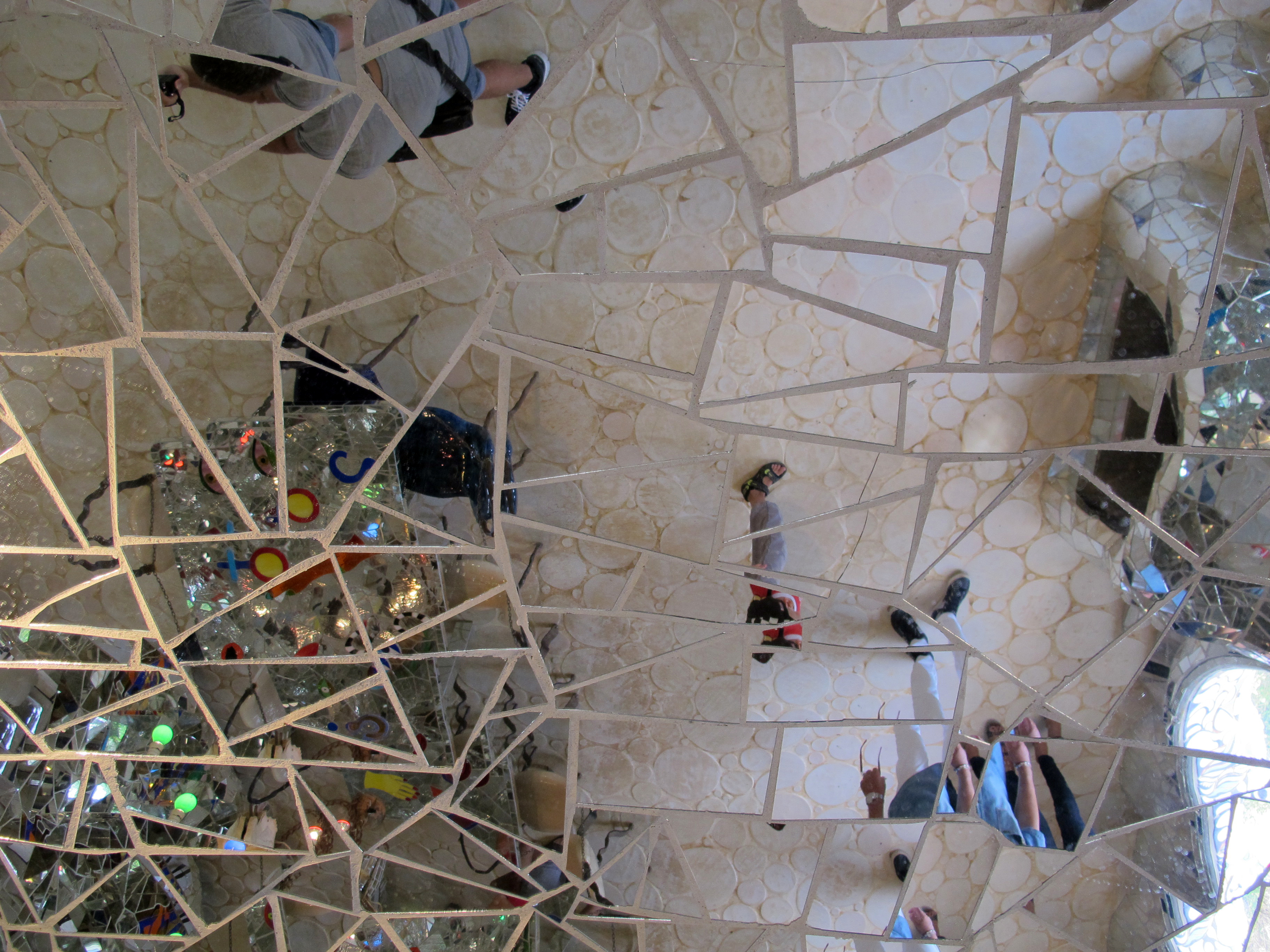
Mirrored mosaic ceiling inside The Empress

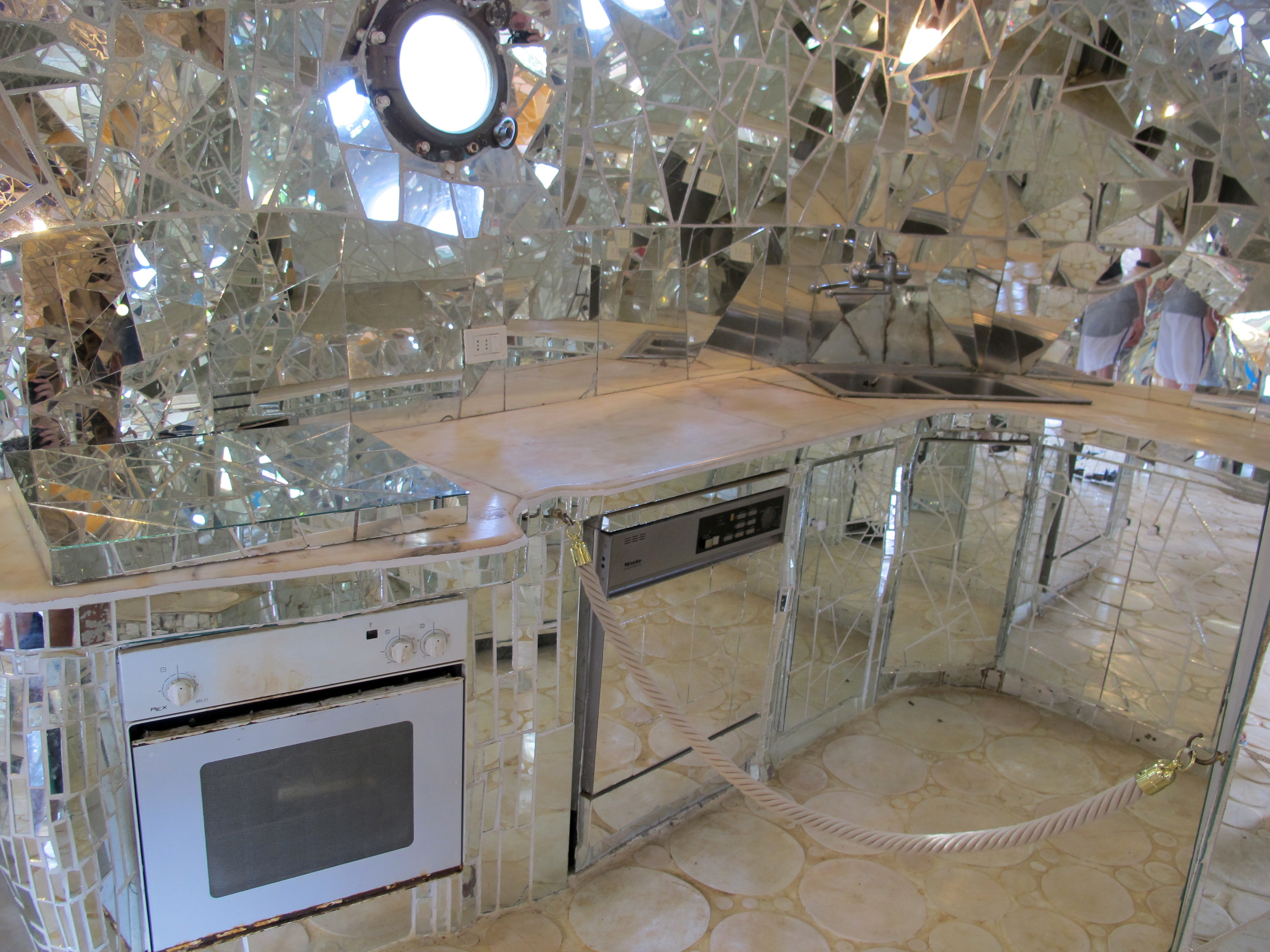
Kitchen used by Saint Phalle inside The Empress

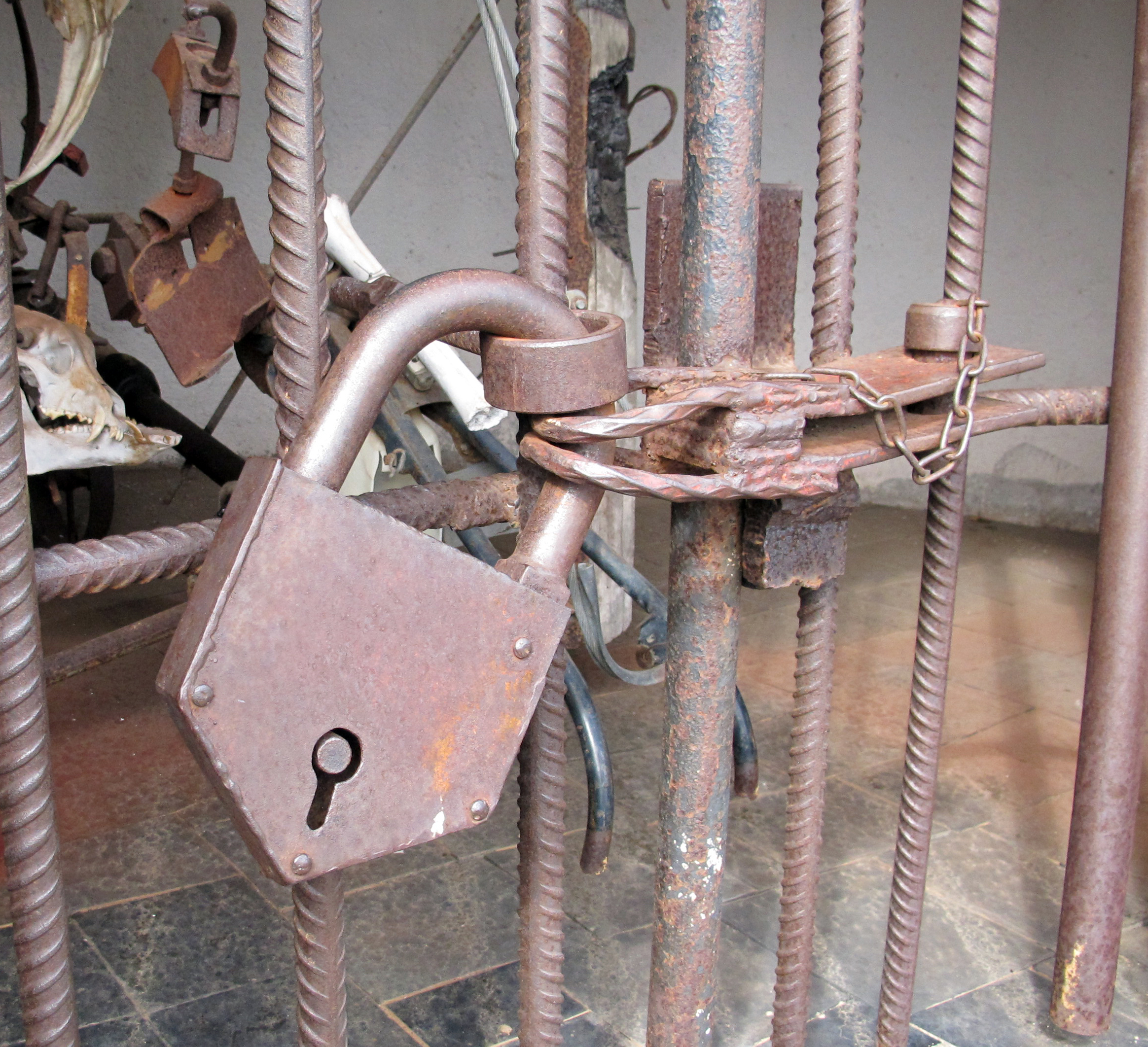
Detail of Justice

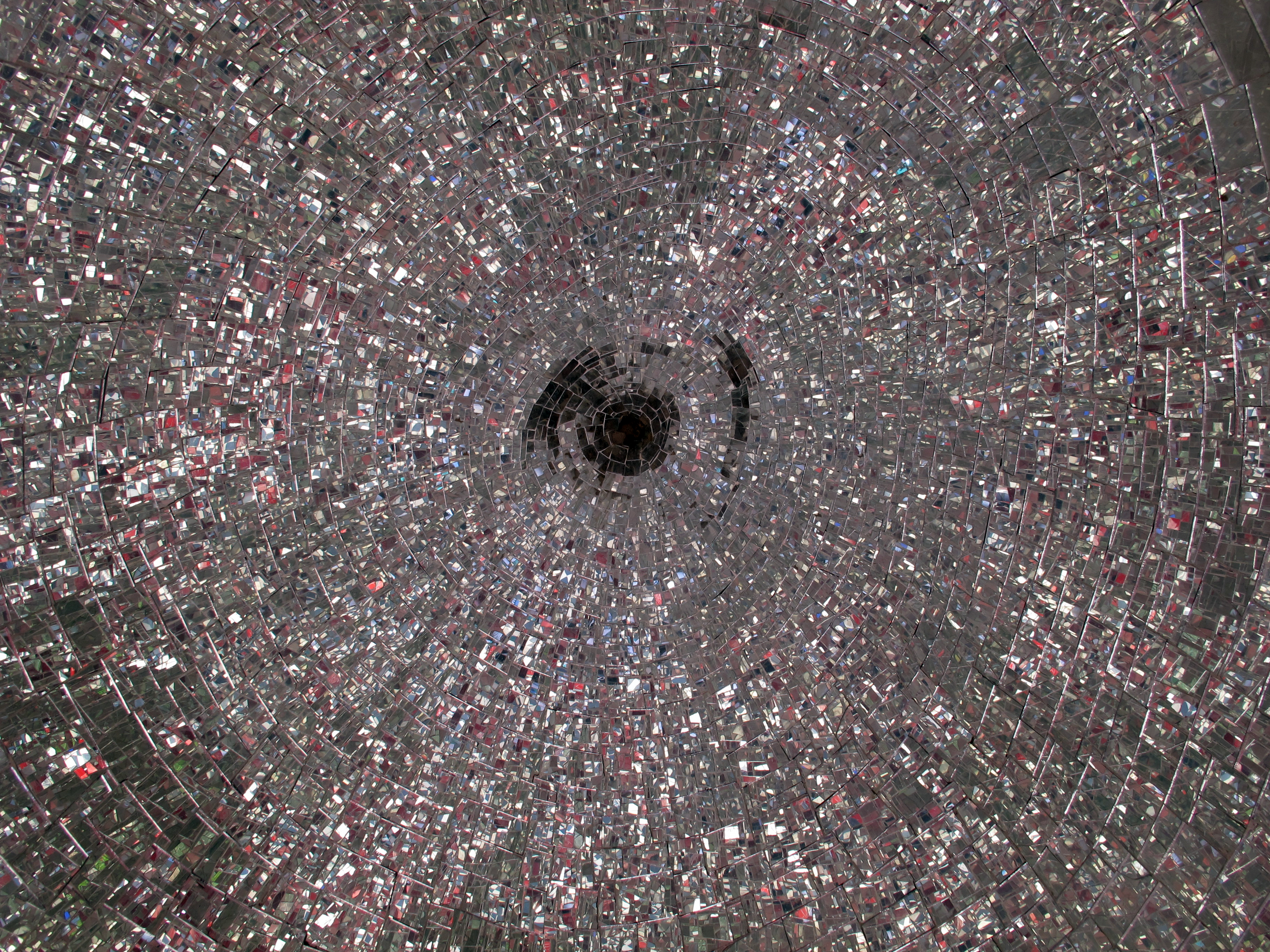
Mosaic ceiling inside The Tower

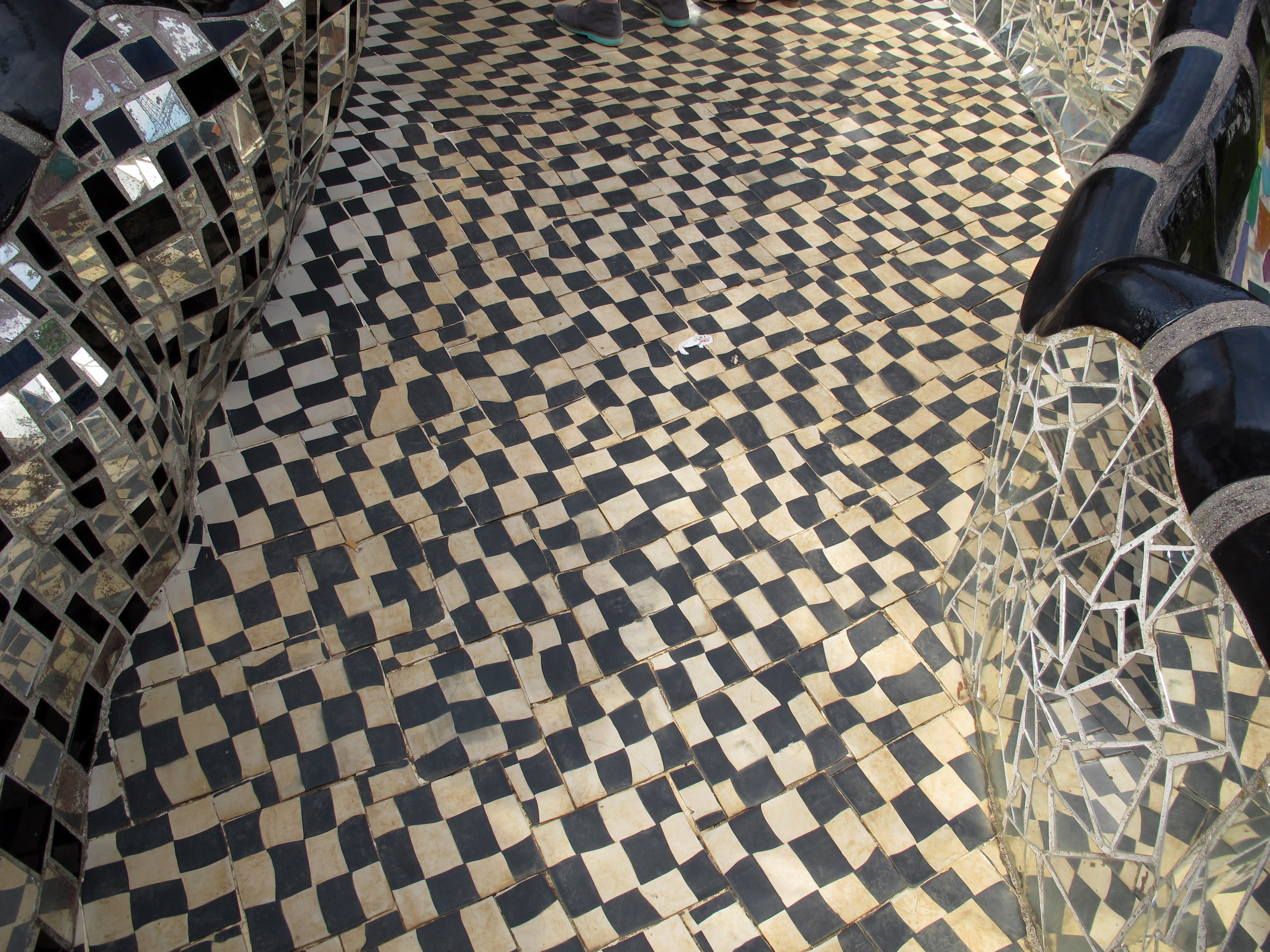
Floor paving at The Tower

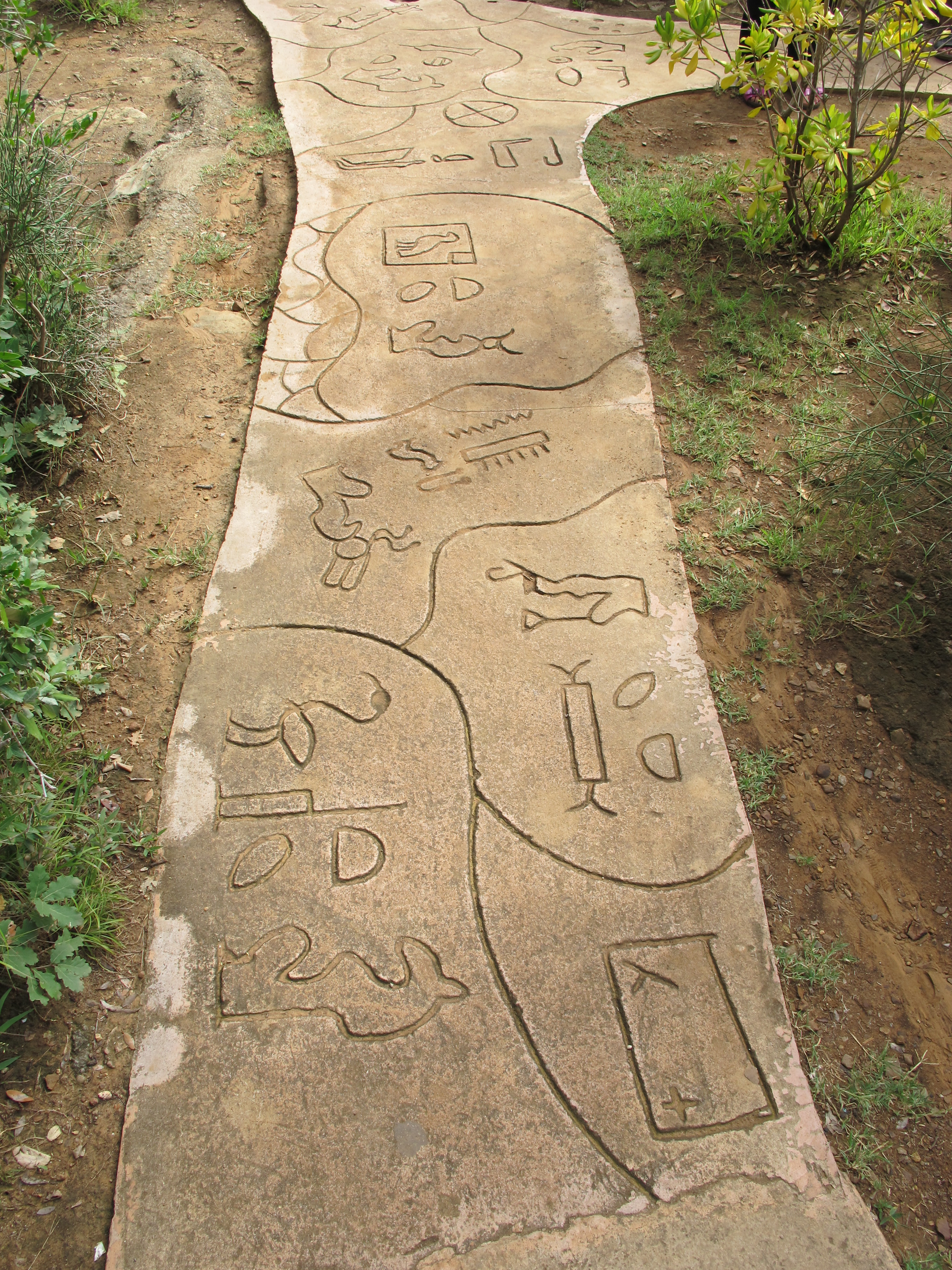
Walkway inscribed with arcane symbols

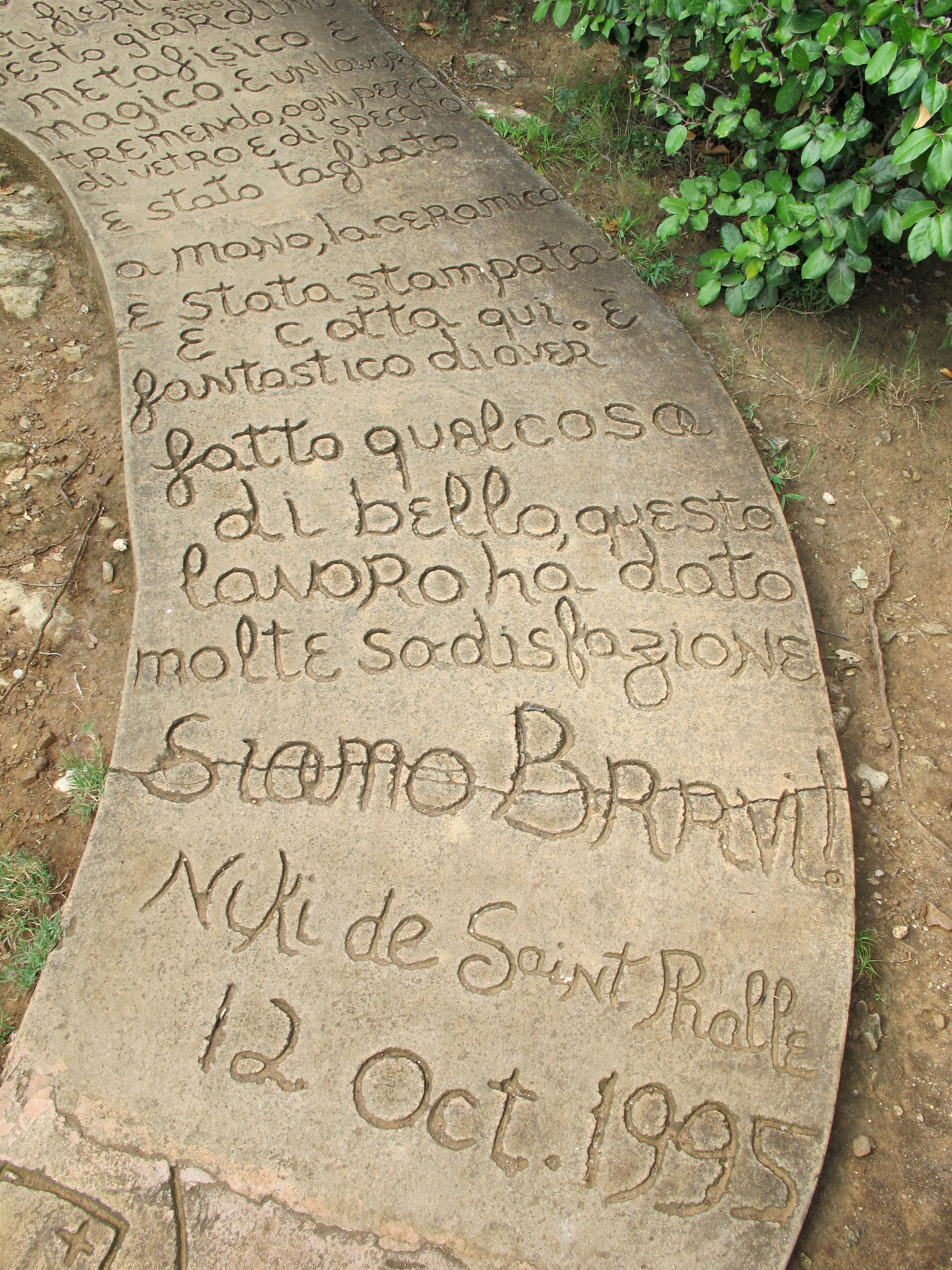
Pathway signed by Saint Phalle

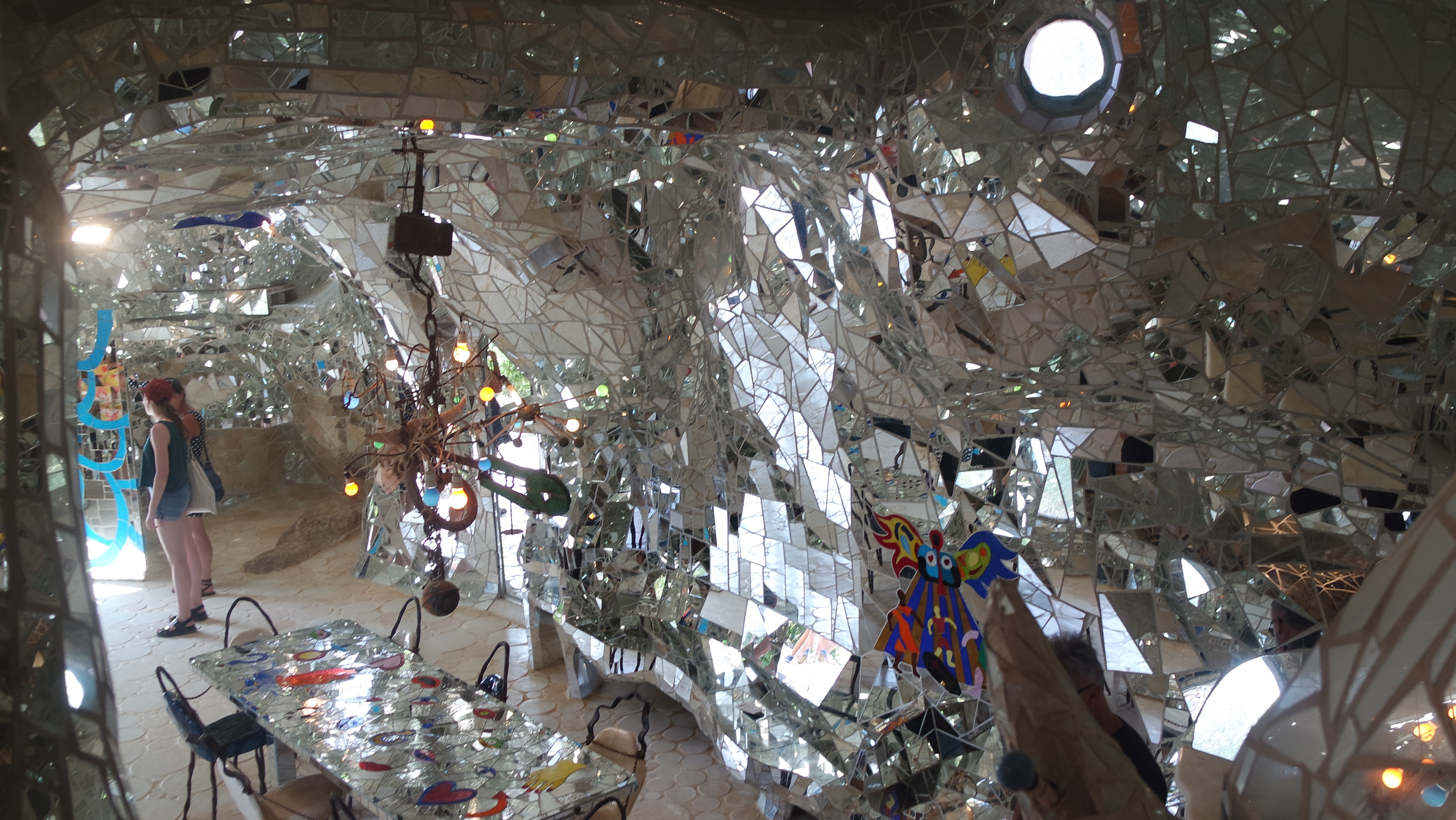
The Empress (internal view)

== Later years (1990–2002) ==
In her final years, Saint Phalle was afflicted with emphysema, asthma, and severe arthritis, which she and many commentators attributed to exposure to airborne glass fibers, fumes, and petrochemicals from materials used in her artworks. Despite these handicaps, she launched into exploring new venues, new technologies, and new art media.

In 1989, Ricardo Menon, Saint Phalle's former assistant, died of AIDS; his death plunged Saint Phalle into depression. She created a large mosaic sculpture of a cat, Chat de Ricardo, to serve as his cemetery headstone in Montparnasse Cemetery, Paris, France. She placed a second copy of the memorial sculpture in her Tarot Garden in Tuscany, where he had worked closely with her for nearly a decade.

In 1990, Saint Phalle completed Skull (Meditation Room), a 5-metre (16 ft) tall room-sized skull-shaped enclosure surfaced in colorful mosaics and lined inside with mosaic mirrors, to memorialize the AIDS crisis. She also used bronze for the first time, in a series of Egyptian gods and goddesses.

In 1991, she produced a maquette for Le Temple Idéal ("The Ideal Temple"), a place of worship welcoming all religions, in response to the religious intolerance she saw while working in Jerusalem. The city of Nîmes (France) commissioned her to build the architectural sculpture, but the project never was constructed, due to politics. Over the years, she had become interested in myths and religious traditions beyond her childhood Roman Catholic upbringing, including Jewish, Hindu, Buddhist, and ancient Egyptian beliefs.

In August 1991, Jean Tinguely died suddenly of a heart attack in Bern, Switzerland. During his previous two years of declining health, he had stopped taking medication and began preparing for death. The couple had separated years before, but remained very close; the loss of her longtime collaborator and intimate friend affected Saint Phalle deeply. She was writing a memoir letter about their first meeting when news of his death reached her.

In his memory, Saint Phalle created her first kinetic sculptures, which she called Méta-Tinguelys. With initial assistance from her artist friend Larry Rivers, she created a series of kinetic reliefs or moving paintings, called Tableaux Éclatés ("Shattered Paintings"), in homage to her late husband and colleague. When a visitor approached, a photocell would trigger motors which caused elements of the paintings to separate.

Saint Phalle lost many friends and associates to AIDS, including Jean-Jacques Goetzman, who died in 1992. She memorialized him with Oiseau pour Jean-Jacques ("Bird for Jean-Jacques"), a large reflective abstract bird sculpture at Montparnasse Cemetery.

As her health deteriorated, she worked on creating the Museum Tinguely in Basel, Switzerland, as well as continuing work on her Tarot Garden. During this time, she became a good friend of the museum's architect Mario Botta, and she also engaged him to design the wall and entryway to her Tarot Garden.

In 1994, Saint Phalle published her hand-illustrated and hand-colored memoirs Mon Secret ("My Secret") in French and revealed her childhood history of sexual abuse. In 1999, she released Traces, an English-language autobiography, which she also illustrated. In 2006, Harry and Me: The Family Years; 1950–1960 was published (posthumously), consisting of her self-illustrated memoirs from the decade when she was married to Harry Mathews.

Saint Phalle moved from Paris to La Jolla, California in 1994 for health reasons. She set up a new studio and produced sculptures which were covered with mirrors, glass, and polished stones, instead of paints. In her new workspace, she started to explore novel technologies for designing and creating artwork. She also became an active member of the San Diego art scene, participating in fund-raisers and exhibitions there.

In 1994 she designed a stamp for Swiss Post, with the message "Stop AIDS/Stop SIDA", for which she was awarded the Prix Caran d’Ache. She also began a series of silkscreened works, which she called California Diary, featuring local fauna. She started a new series of Totem pillars of stacked human or animal figures and anatomical fragments.

In 1994, she finally declared the collaborative sculpture Le Cyclop, started in 1969 by Tinguely and worked on by 15 artists, to be finished. The President of France, François Mitterrand, opened the work to the general public in May. To control vandalism, the installation was donated to the French state, which has taken responsibility for its safeguarding and maintenance. The massive structure is 22.5 metres (74 ft) tall, weighs 350 tonnes (350,000 kg), and is filled with custom-built artworks, including a giant rolling ball sculpture. Many of the artworks are kinetic, endowing the installation with constant motion, and producing loud groaning and other mechanical noises.

In October 1994, the Niki Museum, dedicated to telling the story of her life and artwork, was opened in Nasu, Japan. However, the Niki Museum would later be forced to close in 2011.

In 1994, Saint Phalle worked with Peter Schamoni in making a documentary film about her life story, Niki de Saint Phalle: Wer ist das Monster – Du oder ich? ("Who is the Monster, You or I?"). In 1995, the film was awarded the Bavarian Film Award for best documentary.

In 1996, she began building Gila, a large dragon-shaped children's playhouse for a San Diego private residence. This project was her first use of digital techniques to enlarge drawings into full-scale construction.

In 1996, she supported the opening of the Museum Tinguely in Basel, by donating 55 major sculptures and over 100 graphic works by Tinguely, which constituted much of the core collection. She also donated some of her and her husband's artwork to create L’Espace Jean Tinguely and Niki de Saint Phalle at the Musée d’art et d’histoire in Fribourg, Switzerland.

In 1997, she designed snake chairs of wood with a mosaic inlay, made by Del Cover and Dave Carr.

In 1998, she created a series of Black Heroes sculptures in honor of African-Americans who made major contributions to sports or jazz, including Miles Davis, Louis Armstrong, and Josephine Baker. #19 Baseball Player and #23 Basketball Player, are part of this series. She dedicated the series to her great-grandchildren, who are of mixed race. She also completed her series of 23 large animals for the Noah's Ark sculptural park at the Jerusalem Biblical Zoo with the assistance of her international team of artisans, and in collaboration with architect Mario Botta.

In 1999, she debuted a monumental statue of Buddha, a one-eyed contemplative figure seated in the lotus position. The figure is covered with glittering mosaic tiles, glass, mirrors, and polished stones.

On 17 November 2000, she became an honorary citizen of Hanover, Germany, and donated 300 pieces of her artwork to the Sprengel Museum located there. In 2000, the artist was awarded the Praemium Imperiale award for sculpture, by the Japan Art Association. The award is considered to be the equivalent of the Nobel Prize in the world of art.

In 2001, she gave 170 pieces to the Musée d'art moderne et d'art contemporain (MAMAC) in Nice, France, and donated other works to the Musée des Arts Décoratifs in Paris.

She also designed and built for the Port of San Diego a 12-metre (39 ft) tall, 10-ton sculpture, Coming Together. The largest of her Skinnies series, the artwork consists of a colorful half female and a black-and-white half male face joined, covered with mosaic and stones. The dedication ceremony was delayed to 25 October 2001 because of the September 11 attacks the previous month; the artist was unable to attend because of her deteriorating health. The artwork signified her interpretation of yin and yang, sickness and health, and the integration of dual aspects into a unified whole.

Saint Phalle endured intensive care hospitalization for six months before dying of respiratory failure (caused by emphysema) at Scripps Memorial Hospital in La Jolla, on 21 May 2002. She was attended by her first husband Harry Mathews, and their children.

Up until the end, she continued to design further developments for her Tarot Garden in Italy, including a maze, for which land was cleared, and metal rods were installed. Upon her death, all new developments in her garden were halted, as she had previously specified. Since then, some modest changes have been implemented, mostly to accommodate an increasing number of visitors. A garden cafe designed by Mario Botta has also been constructed. One salient exception is the Tarot figure of Le Fou ("The Fool"), which Saint Phalle relocated within the Tarot Garden at least twice during her life. This symbolic migrational tradition is expected to be continued from time to time.

Posthumously, the Grotto (2001–2003) was completed according to detailed instructions left by Saint Phalle. The permanent installation, in the Grosser Garten, Herrenhausen Gardens, Hanover, consisted of three rooms which were decorated on every surface with mirrors, glass, ceramics, and colored stones.

Posthumously, Queen Califia's Magical Circle (2000–2003), a 120-foot (37 m) diameter sun-drenched sculpture garden designed by Saint Phalle, was opened in Escondido, California in October 2002. It is enclosed in a 400-foot (120 m) undulating wall topped with large python-like snakes, and includes a maze and 10 large sculptures she designed, comprising the most extensive public collection of her work in the US. The artworks were inspired by Native American culture, and decorations also included symbols and plaques referring to her earlier Tarot Garden.

== Legacy ==
Throughout her career, Saint Phalle was outspoken in addressing important religious conflict, political, pandemic health, race, gender, reproductive rights, food security, climate change, and cultural issues of the time. Her Tirs series and assemblages reflected the violence of the early 1960s Algerian War for independence from France and asserted her rebellion as part of second-wave feminism. In spite of the spectacular use of firearms in her Tirs series of early work, she supported gun control.

After her foray into modeling in the 1940s and '50s, the fashion world again fixated on her appearance during the second half of the 1960s as she gained fame for her artwork, with photo spreads of her in prominent fashion magazines and designer Marc Bohan of Dior designing clothes exclusively for her. Her personal style of dress during the mid-sixties inspired designer Yves Saint Laurent to create his "le Smoking" trouser suits in 1966, versions of which he continued to produce for decades afterward.

Her enormous, curvaceous Nanas celebrated the fecund female form, featuring large breasts and buttocks, splayed limbs, joyous dance postures, and often, black skin. She was one of the earliest artistic champions of AIDS awareness, creating artworks and a widely distributed educational book. Shortly before her death, she exhibited drawings critical of the George W Bush administration. In addition to her artworks, she wrote extensively in both French and English, and granted numerous interviews; much of this material is collected in her archives.

Wayne Coyne of The Flaming Lips cited Saint Phalle's sculpture Firebird as direct inspiration for the cover art of their hugely successful 2002 album Yoshimi Battles the Pink Robots.

== Gallery ==
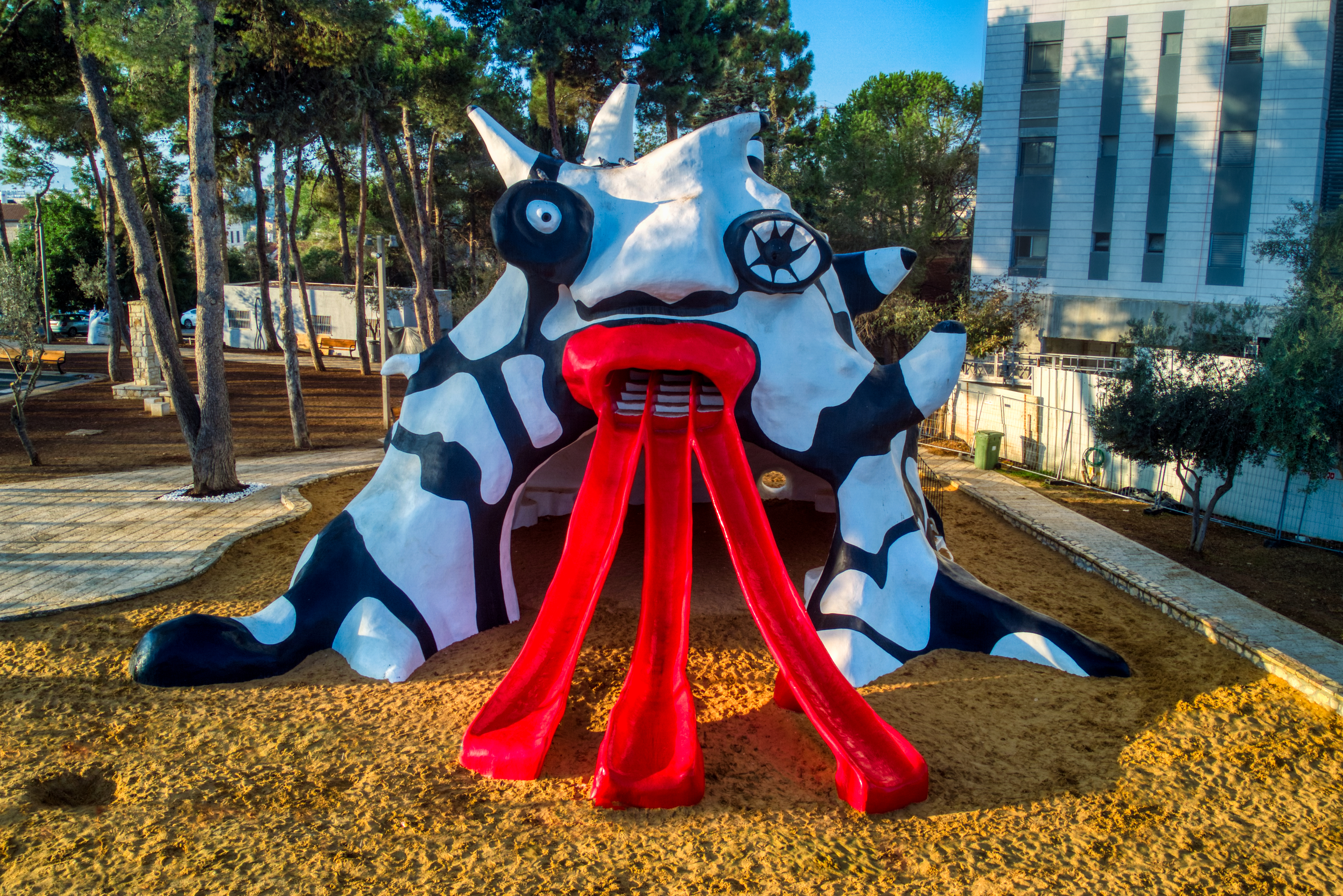
Golem (1971), Kiryat Hayovel, Israel

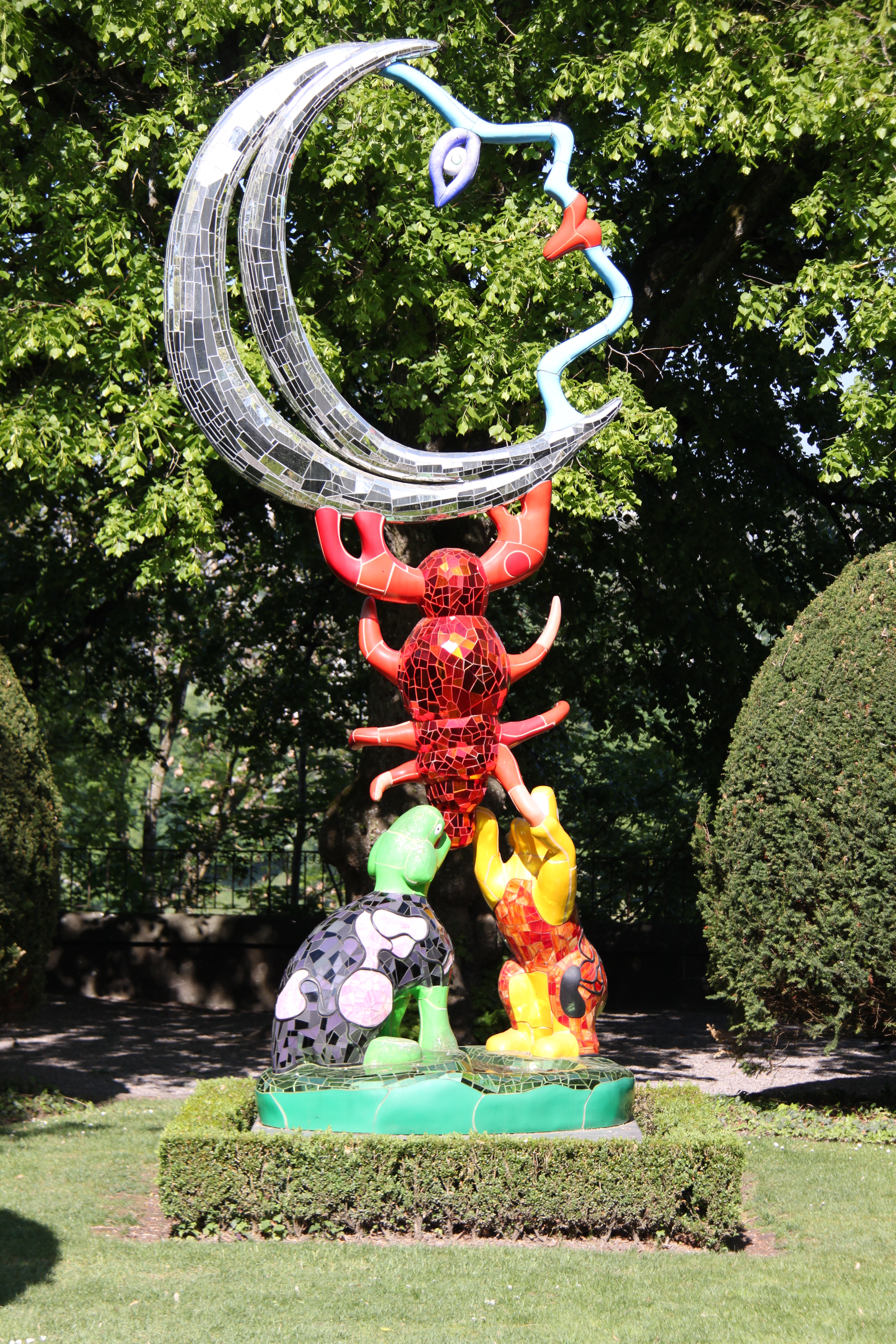
La Grande Lune ("Great Moon", 1985/1992), MAHF Fribourg, Switzerland

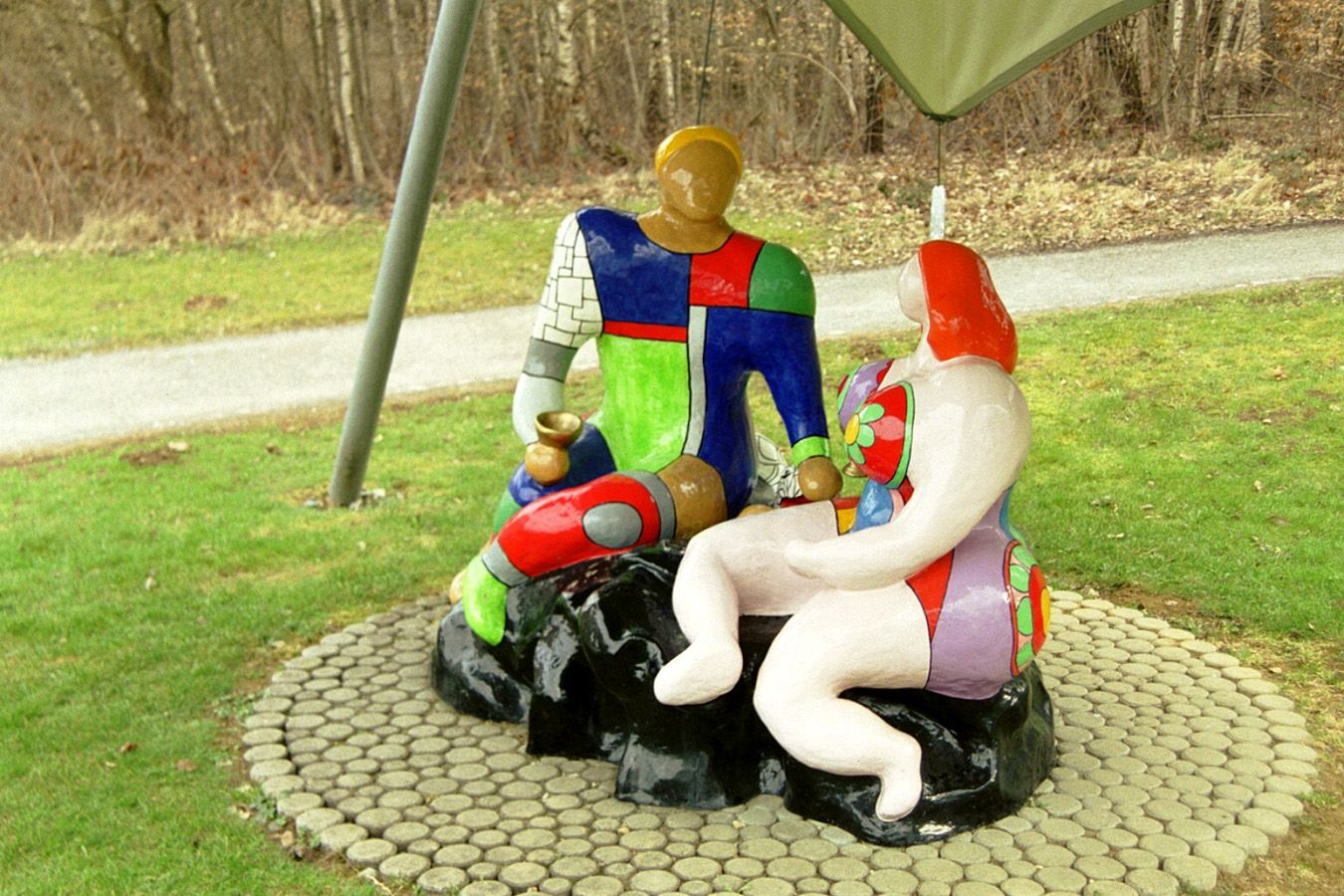
Adam and Eve (1985), Ulm, Germany

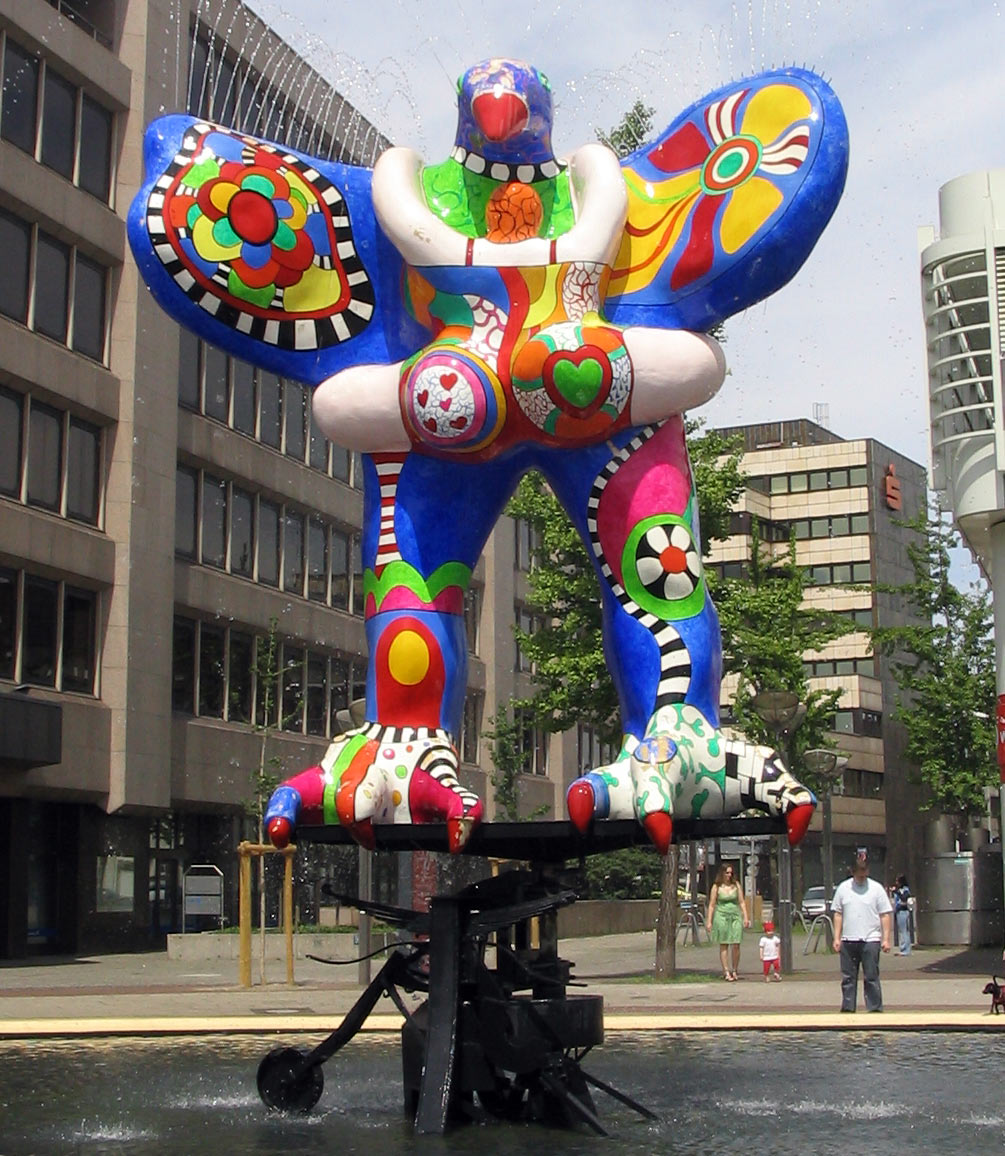
Lifesaver Fountain (1993), Duisburg, Germany

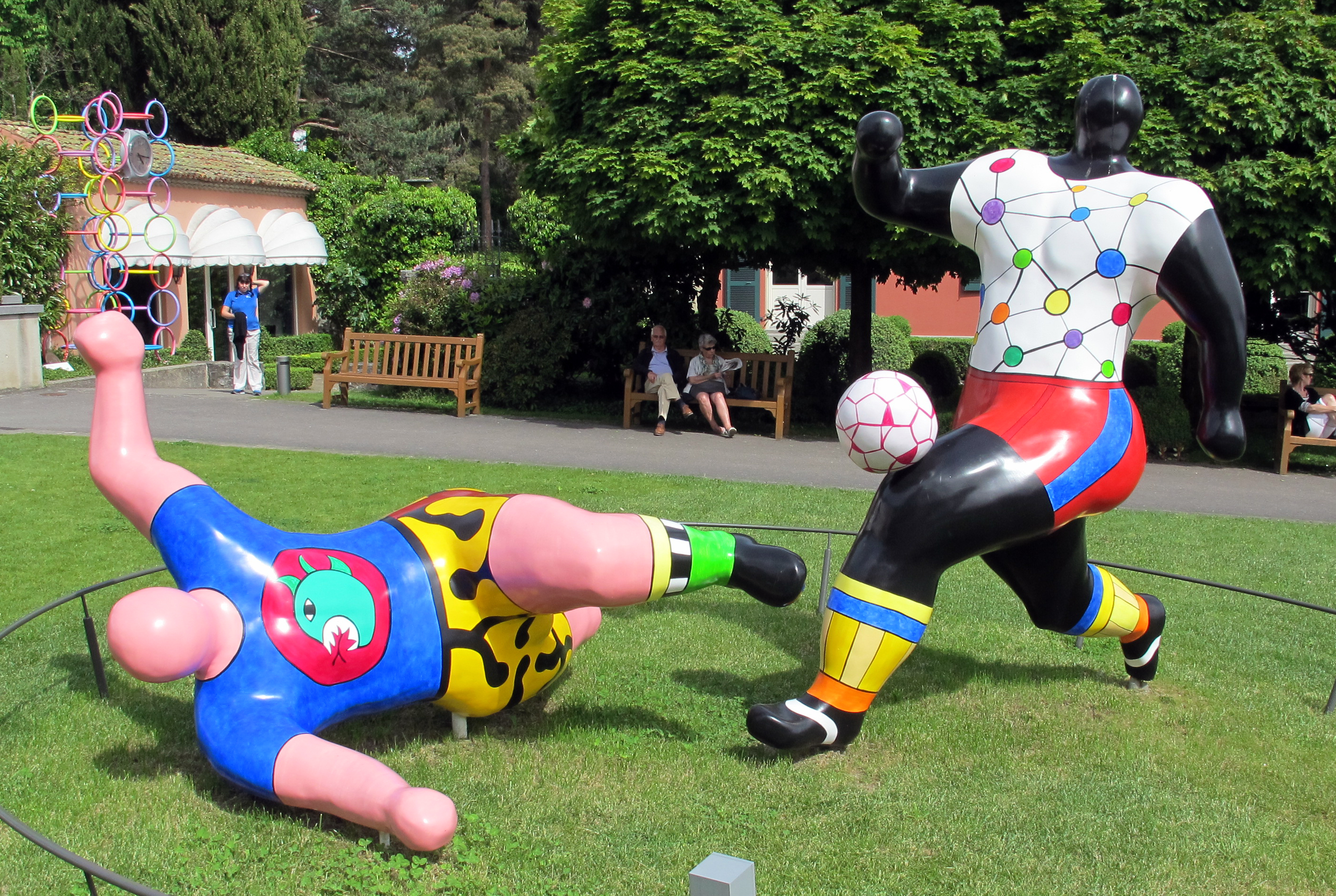
Les Footballeurs ("Soccer Players", 1993), The Olympic Museum, Lausanne

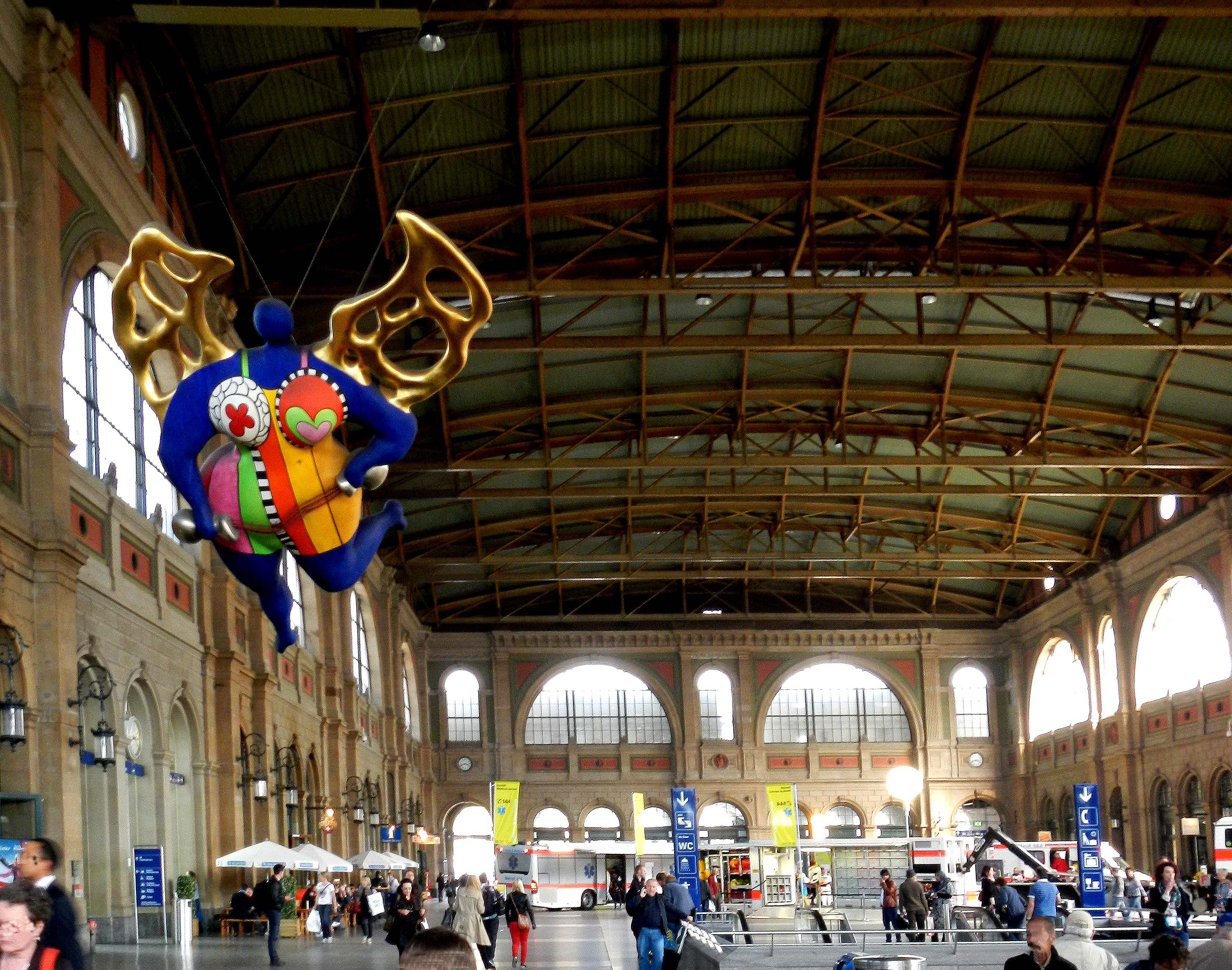
L'Ange Protecteur ("Guardian Angel", 1997), Zürich Hauptbahnhof

== Major exhibitions ==
- 1998 Niki de Saint Phalle : insider, outsider world inspired art, Mingei International Museum on The Prado, Balboa Park, San Diego, California
- 2000 La Fête. Die Schenkung Niki de Saint Phalle ("Celebration: The Donation of Niki de Saint Phalle"), Sprengel Museum, Hanover, Germany
- 2002 [retrospective], Museum of Modern and Contemporary Art (MAMAC), Nice, France
- 2010-2011 New York Avenue Sculpture Project: Niki de Saint Phalle, National Museum of Women in the Arts, Washington, D.C.
- 2014 Niki de Saint Phalle, Grand Palais, Galeries nationales, Paris, France
- 2016 Niki de Saint Phalle, Arken Museum of Modern Art, Ishøj, Denmark
- 2021 Niki de Saint Phalle: Structures for Life, MoMA PS1, Queens, New York City
- 2021-2022 Niki de Saint Phalle in the 1960s, Menil Collection, Houston, Texas; Museum of Contemporary Art San Diego
- 2024 Niki de Saint Phalle: Rebellion and Joy, Nelson-Atkins Museum of Art, Kansas City, Missouri
- 2025 Niki de Saint Phalle In Print, National Museum of Women in the Arts, Washington, D.C.
- 2025-2026 Niki de Saint Phalle & Jean Tinguely – Myths & Machines, Hauser & Wirth, Somerset

== Public art ==
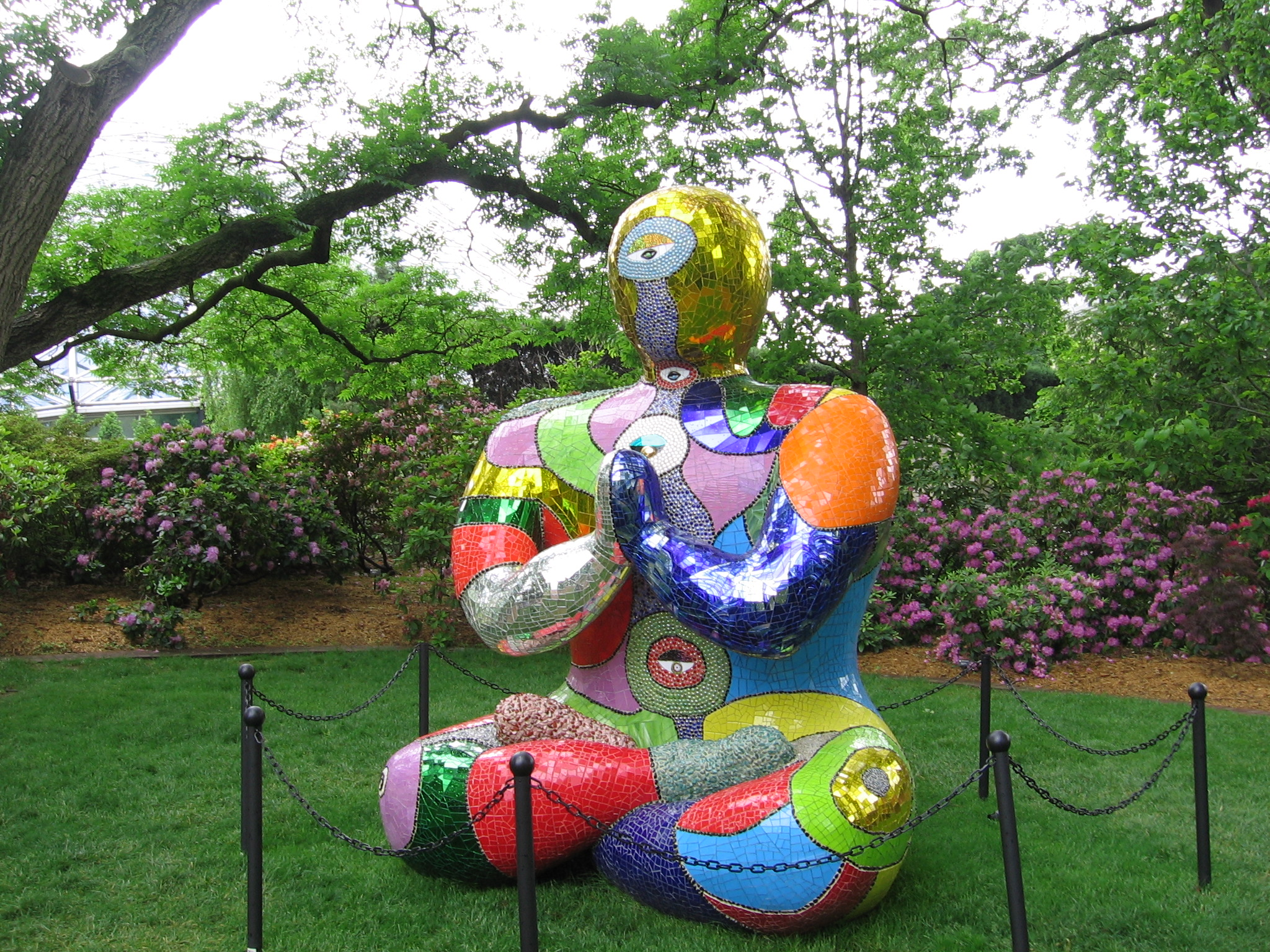
Buddha (1999)

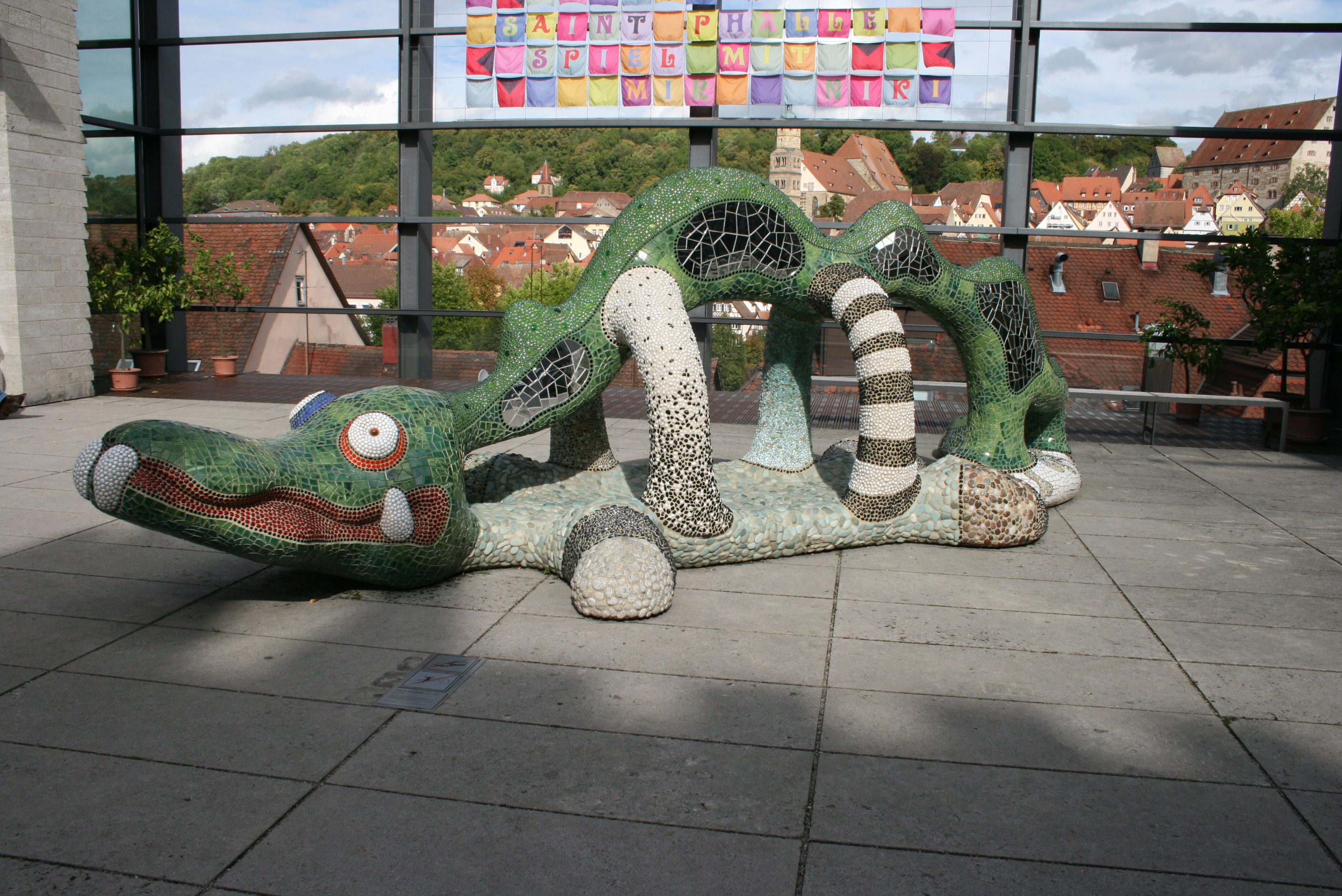
Nikigator (2001)

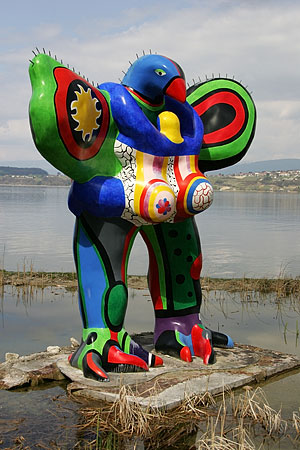
Oiseau Amoureux (1993)

Many of Saint Phalle's sculptures are large and are exhibited in public places. The Niki Charitable Art Foundation maintains an online map and catalog of all her extant public artworks, including a pizza oven in La Jolla, California.

- Le Paradis Fantastique ("The Fantastic Paradise", 1967), Moderna Museet, Stockholm, Sweden (in collaboration with Tinguely)
- Golem (1971), Kiryat Hayovel, Jerusalem
- Hannover Nanas (1973), along the Leibnizufer in Hanover, Germany
- La Fontaine Stravinsky (Stravinsky Fountain or Fontaine des automates, 1982) near the Centre Pompidou, Paris (in collaboration with Tinguely)
- Sun God (1983), a fanciful winged creature next to the Faculty Club on the campus of the University of California San Diego as a part of the Stuart Collection of public art
- La Lune ("The Moon", 1987), Brea Mall in Brea, California
- Fontaine de Château-Chinon (1988), at Château-Chinon, Nièvre (in collaboration with Tinguely), a commission by French president François Mitterrand
- Le Grand Oiseau Amoureux ("Great Amorous Bird", 1988–1989), Mendrisio, Switzerland, depicts a Nana in a Yab-Yum embrace with a large standing bird
- Grand Oiseau de Feu sur l’arche ("Great Firebird on the Arch", 1991), in front of Bechtler Plaza in Charlotte, North Carolina
- La Tempérance (1992), near Villa Vauban, Luxembourg City, Luxembourg
- Le Monstre du Loch Ness ("Loch Ness Monster", 1992), Musée d'art moderne et d'art contemporain (MAMAC), Nice, France
- Oiseau Amoureux Fontaine / Lebensretter-Brunnen ("Amorous Bird Fountain / Lifesaver Fountain", 1989–1993), Duisburg, Germany (in collaboration with Tinguely)
- Le Cyclop (1969–1994), Milly-la-Forêt, France (in collaboration with Tinguely and 15 other artists)
- Tympanum (1996) triangular mirror mosaic and mirrored pediment above the entrance to the Glasgow Gallery of Modern Art, Scotland
- L'Ange Protecteur ("Guardian Angel", 1997) in the hall of Zürich Hauptbahnhof, the largest rail station in Switzerland
- Le poète et sa muse ("Poet and His Muse", 1998), Mingei International Museum on The Prado, Balboa Park, San Diego, California
- Big Ganesh (1998), San Diego Museum of Contemporary Art, the Hindu elephant-god Ganesh dances with a small mouse
- Miles Davis (1999), outside of Hotel Negresco in Nice, France
- Ricardo Cat (1999), Laumeier Sculpture Park, Saint Louis, Missouri
- Noah's Ark (1994–2001), Jerusalem Biblical Zoo, 23 works in a collaborative sculpture park with architect Mario Botta
- Nikigator (2001), Mingei International Museum on The Prado, Balboa Park, San Diego, California
- Coming Together (2001), San Diego Convention Center
- Grotto (2001–2003), Herrenhäuser Gardens in Hanover, Germany
- Queen Califia's Magical Circle (2003), a sculpture garden in Kit Carson Park, Escondido, California

== Museums and collections ==
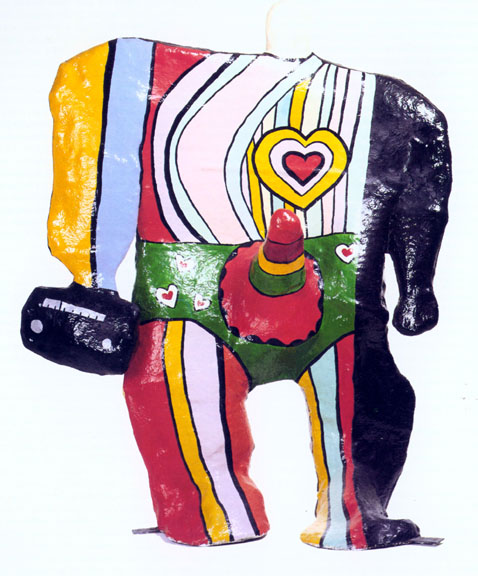
Adam

A “Jean Tinguely–Niki de Saint Phalle Museum” exists in Fribourg, Switzerland, entirely dedicated to her and her husbands’ works.

The Sprengel Museum has the largest holdings of Niki de Saint Phalle's work, and other major holdings are at MAMAC.

The Bechtler Museum of Modern Art in Charlotte, North Carolina has several works by Niki de Saint Phalle in its permanent collection, as well as the Grand Oiseau de Feu sur l’arche ("Great Firebird on the Arch", 1991) which stands on a sidewalk outside the museum.

The Saint Phalle archives and artistic rights are held by the Niki Charitable Art Foundation (NCAF) in Santee, California, near San Diego, which became active upon her death. The NCAF maintains an online catalog of artworks in museums and major collections.

== Bibliography (by publication date) ==
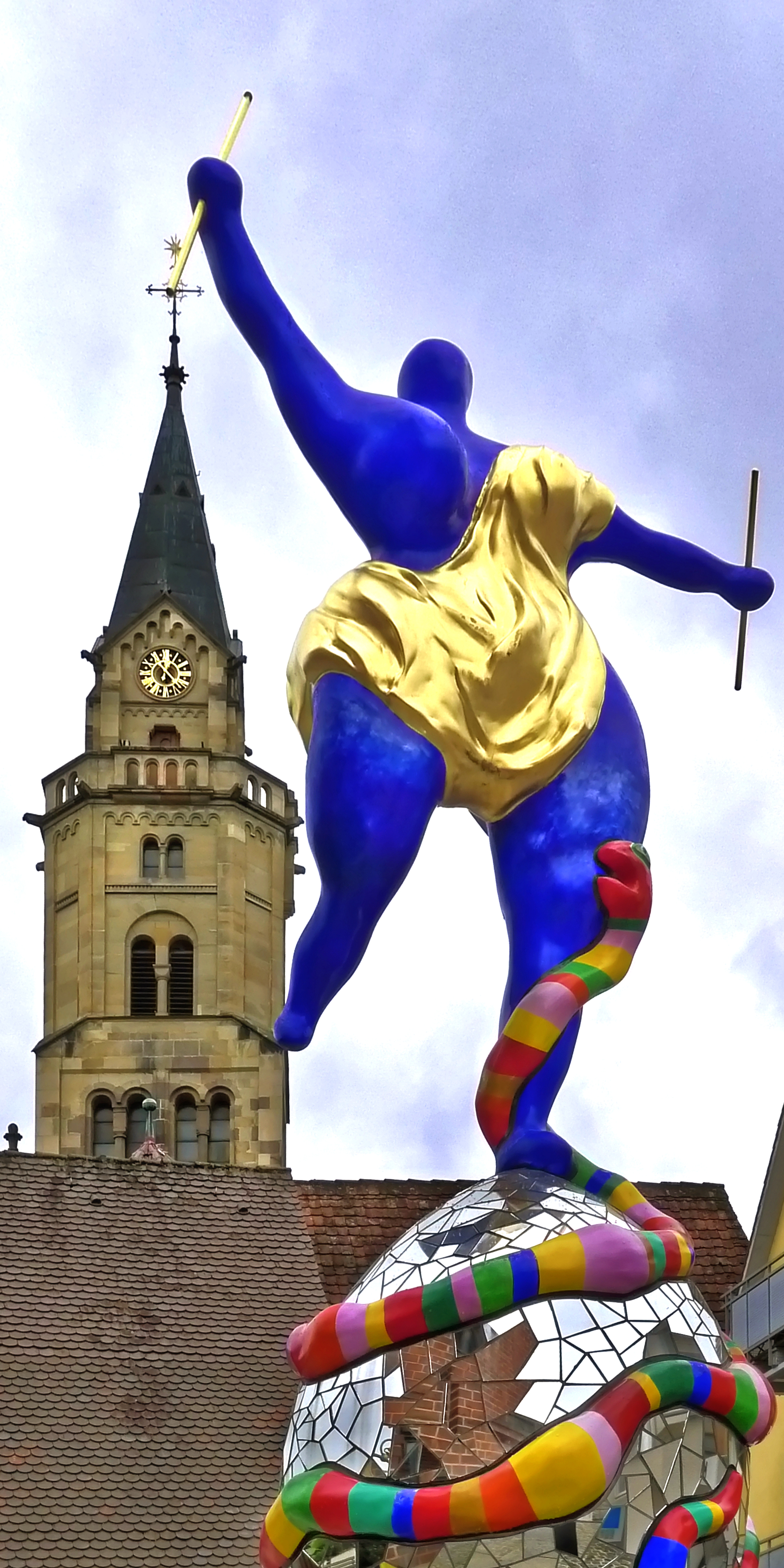
The World

- Saint Phalle, Niki de (1987). AIDS: You Can't Catch It Holding Hands. San Francisco, California: Lapis Press. ISBN 0-932499-52-X.
- Saint Phalle, Niki de (1994). Mon secret (in French). Paris: La Différence. ISBN 978-2729109783. – autobiography
- Hulten, Pontus (1995). Niki de Saint Phalle: Kunst- und Ausstellungshalle der Bundesrepublik Deutschland (in German) (2nd ed.). Stuttgart: Verlag Gerd Hatje. ISBN 3-7757-0582-1.
- Mazzanti, Anna, ed. (1998). Niki de Saint Phalle: The Tarot Garden: [created on the occasion of the exhibition "Il giardino dei Tarocchi di Niki de Saint Phalle" at Orbetello, Polveriera Guzman in 1997] (1. Ital. ed.). Milan: Charta. ISBN 88-8158-167-1.
- Longenecker, Martha; et al., eds. (1998). Niki de Saint Phalle: Insider, Outsider World Inspired Art: The 20th anniversary exhibition of Mingei International Museum. LaJolla: Mingei Internat. Museum. ISBN 0-914155-10-5.
- Saint Phalle, Niki de (1999). Traces: An autobiography. Lausanne: Acatos. ISBN 2-940033-43-9.
- Parente, Janice, ed. (2001). Niki de Saint Phalle: Catalogue Raisonné: 1949–2000. Lausanne: Ed. Acatos. ISBN 2-940033-48-X.
- de Gréce, Michele; et al. (2002). Niki de Saint Phalle Monographie, Monograph, Catalogue raisonné. Lausanne: Acatos. ISBN 2-940033-63-3.
- Landeshauptstadt Hannover, Fachbereich Umwelt und Stadtgrün (2003). Niki de Saint Phalle: The Grotto; [published on the occasion of the opening of the Grotto designed by Niki de Saint Phalle in the Herrenhausen Gardens in Hanover]. Ostfildern-Ruit: Hatje Cantz Verlag. ISBN 3-7757-1276-3.
- Schulz-Hoffmann, Carla (2003). Niki de Saint Phalle: My Art, My Dreams. Munich; Berlin; London; New York: Prestel. ISBN 3-7913-2876-X.
- Krempel, Ulrich; Jackson, Rosie (2004). Niki's world: Niki de Saint Phalle (2nd ed.). Munich: Prestel. ISBN 3-7913-3068-3.
- Saint Phalle, Niki de; Niki Charitable Art Foundation (NCAF) (2006). Harry and me: the family years; 1950–1960. [Wabern-Bern]: Benteli Publishers. ISBN 3-7165-1442-X.
- Applin, Jo, "Alberto Burri and Niki de Saint Phalle: Relief Sculpture and Violence in the Sixties", Source: Notes in the History of Art, Winter 2008
- Catherine Francblin, Niki de Saint Phalle: la révolte à l'œuvre: biographie (in French). Paris: Hazan. 2013. ISBN 978-2754104975.
- Weidemann, Christiane (2014). Niki de Saint Phalle. Prestel. ISBN 978-3-7913-4975-6.
- Pesapane, Lucia; Saint Phalle, Niki de; Niki Charitable Art Foundation (2014). Le petit dictionnaire Niki de Saint Phalle: en 49 symboles (in French). Paris: Réunion des musées nationales. ISBN 978-2-7118-6155-2. – Compendium of recurring symbols in the artist's work, and some of their possible meanings
- Gether, Christian; Høholt, Stine; Jalving, Camilla (2016). Niki de Sainte Phalle. Ishøj, Denmark: Arken. ISBN 9788778751140.
- Krempel, Ulrich; Selter, Regina, eds. (2016). Ich bin eine Kämpferin: Frauenbilder der Niki de Saint Phalle = I'm a fighter: images of women by Niki de Saint Phalle (in German and English). Hatje Cantz. ISBN 978-3-7757-4243-6.
- Saint-Phalle, Niki de (2021). Niki de Saint Phalle: Structures for Life. New York: MoMA PS1. ISBN 978-1-942884-67-5. – Catalog of the artist's first retrospective exhibition in New York City, where the artist spent much of her childhood and adolescence
- Dawsey, Jill (2021). Niki de Saint Phalle in the 1960s. San Diego, California: Museum of Contemporary Art San Diego. ISBN 978-0300260106. – Catalog of exhibition covering the 1960s Tirs and early Nanas series of artworks

A short, annotated bibliography is available at the Niki Charitable Art Foundation website.

As of February 2022, an online catalogue raisonné of the artist's "Nanas" is "forthcoming".

== Filmography ==
- Daddy (1973), written and directed by Saint Phalle and Peter Lorrimer Whitehead
- Un rêve plus long que la nuit / Camélia et le Dragon ("A dream longer than the night / Camelia and the Dragon", 1976), written and directed by Saint Phalle
- Niki de Saint Phalle: Wer ist das Monster – Du oder ich? ("Who is the Monster, You or I?", 1995), biographical documentary (in German) by Peter Schamoni in collaboration with Saint Phalle
- Niki de Saint Phalle: Introspections and Reflections (2003), posthumous documentary by André Blas
- Niki de Saint Phalle and Jean Tinguely: Bonnie and Clyde of the arts (2012), posthumous documentary by Louise Faure and Anne Julien
- Niki de Saint Phalle, un rêve d’architecte (Niki de Saint Phalle: An architect’s dream, 2014), posthumous documentary by Louise Faure and Anne Julien
- Niki, 2024 biopic on Saint Phalle's life, directed by Céline Sallette with Charlotte Le Bon playing the title role

A comprehensive listing is at the Niki Charitable Art Foundation website.

== See also ==
- Isabelle Collin Dufresne – French-American artist and author (1935–2014)
- Louise Bourgeois – French-American artist (1911–2010)
- Marisol Escobar – Venezuelan American sculptor (1930–2016)
- Nouveau réalisme – Artist group and art movement
