= List of public art in San Diego =

Public artworks in San Diego, California, include one public art collection, the Stuart Collection; several outdoor sculptures, including many at the May S. Marcy Sculpture Garden; and a variety of works sponsored by the Port of San Diego.

== Public art collections ==
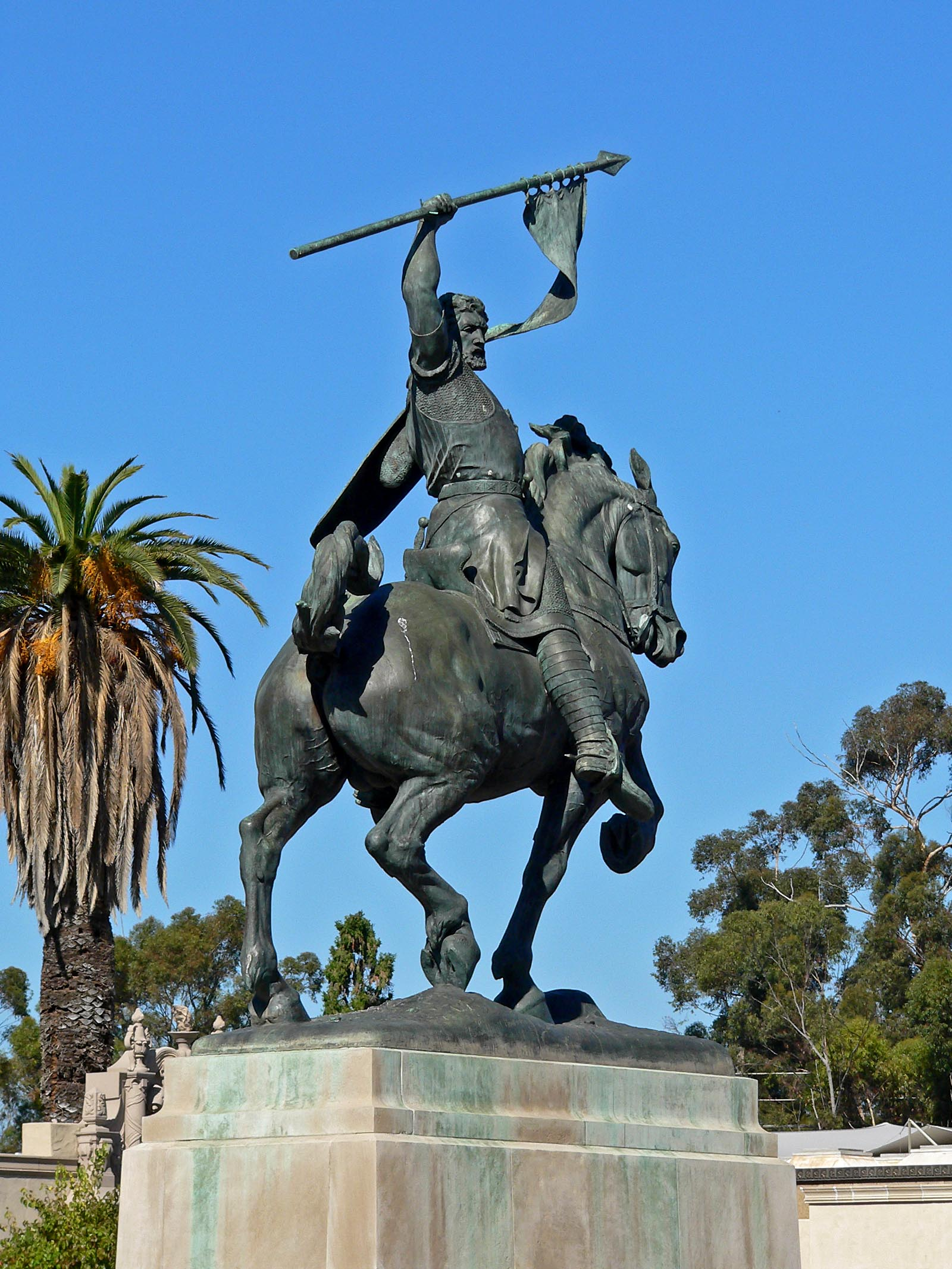
- El Cid Campeador, Balboa Park
  Stuart Collection

== Outdoor sculptures ==
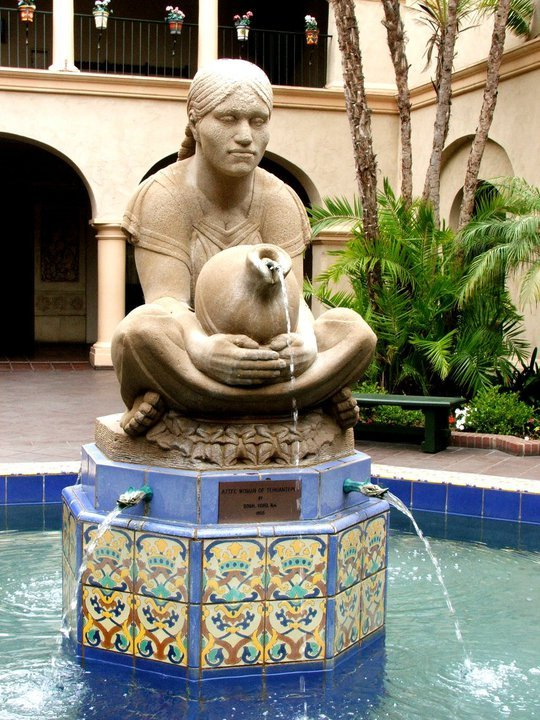
Woman of Tehuantepec, Balboa Park

- #19 Baseball Player
- Bow Wave
- Breaking of the Chains
- Dream
- El Cid Campeador
- Fallen Star
- Fountain of Two Oceans
- Guardian of Water
- Morning
- Nikigator
- Shedding the Cloak
- Statue of Alonzo Horton
- Statue of Benito Juárez
- Statue of Ernest W. Hahn
- Statue of Jerry Coleman
- Statue of Pete Wilson
- Statue of Tony Gwynn
- Sun God
- Unconditional Surrender
- Woman of Tehuantepec

=== May S. Marcy Sculpture Garden ===
Featured works in the May S. Marcy Sculpture Garden include:

- Aim I (Alexander Liberman, 1980)
- Big Open Skull (Jack Zajac)
- Border Crossing/Cruzando el Rio Bravo (Luis Jiménez, 1989)
- Cubi XV (David Smith)
- Figure for Landscape (Barbara Hepworth)
- Mother and Daughter Seated (Francisco Zúñiga)
- Night Presence II (Louise Nevelson, 1976)
- Odyssey III (Tony Rosenthal, 1973)
- The Prodigal Son (Auguste Rodin)
- Reclining Figure: Arch Leg (Henry Moore)
- Solar Bird (Joan Miró)
- Sonata Primitive (Saul Baizerman)
- Spinal Column (Alexander Calder, 1968)
- Two Lines Oblique: San Diego (George Rickey, 1993)
- The Watchers (Lynn Chadwick, 1960)

== Port of San Diego ==
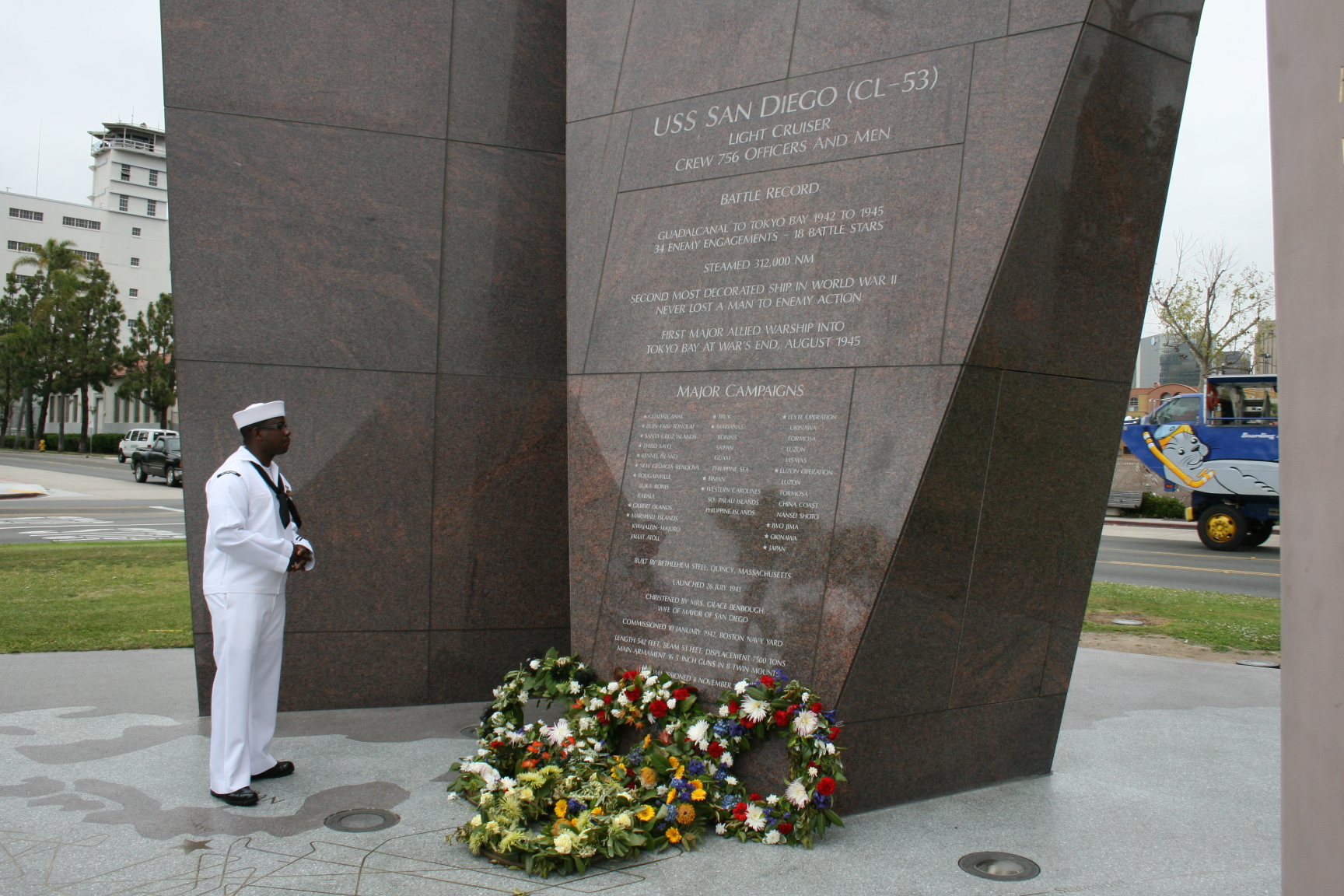
USS San Diego (CL-53) Memorial

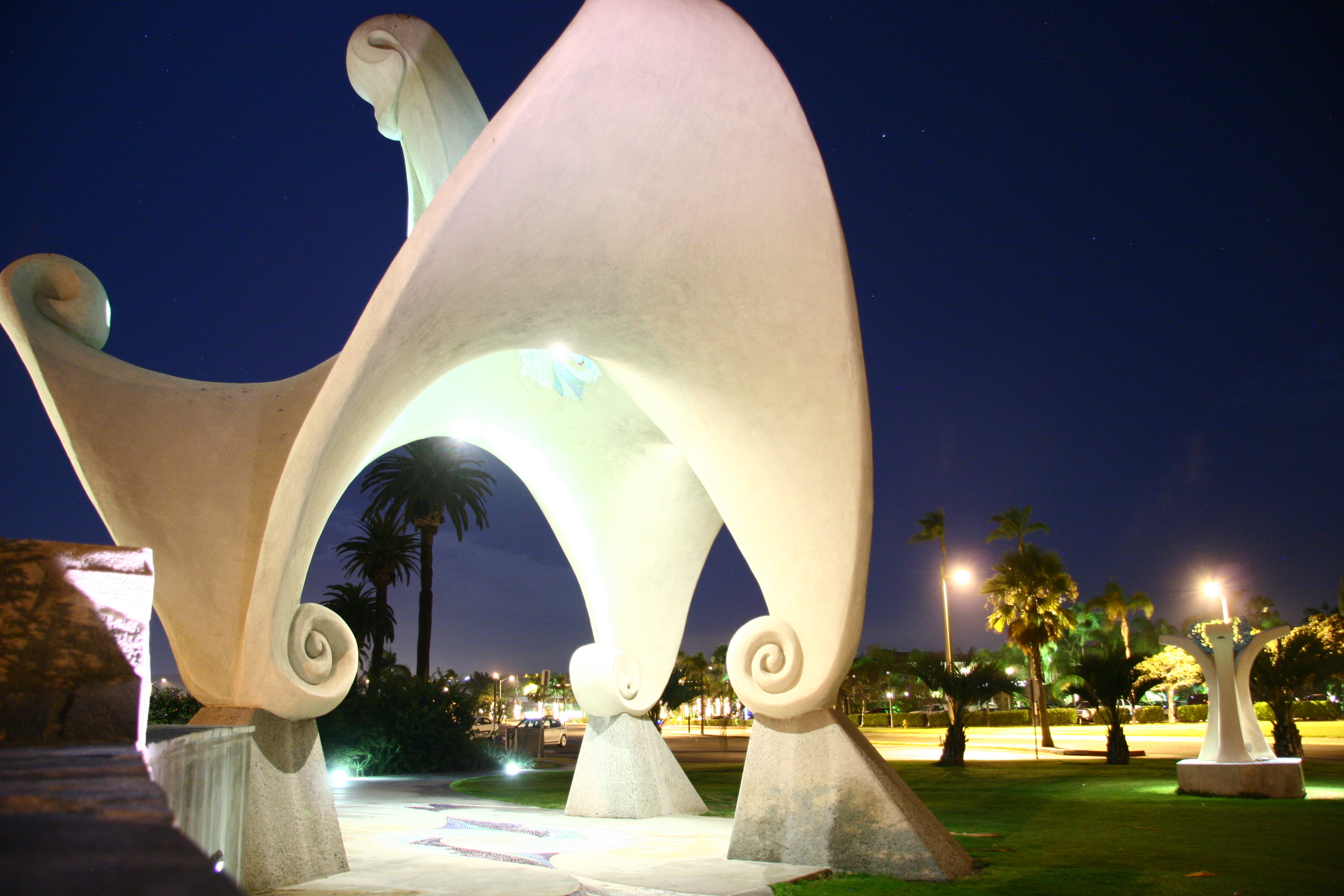
Gazebo at Shelter Island

The Port of San Diego has sponsored many pieces of public art in and around San Diego.

- A Different But Loving Pair by Cecilia Stanford
- Arbor Urbanus Metallicus by James T. Frost (2005) (National City)
- Banner Art by John Banks
- Admiral Sprague by Moon Kim (bust)
- Battle of Leyte Gulf Memorial by Taffy 3
- Bayside Seating art benches by Doug Snider
- Benefit of Mr. Kite by Mags Harries & Lajos Héder
- Between Bay and Sky by Kim Emerson (2003) (National City)
- Bubble Bath by Dan Hill
- Cannery Workers tribute by Valerie Salatino & Nancy Moran
- Children's Park fountain by Peter Walker
- Coming Together by Niki de St. Phalle
- Cruise Ship Terminal Trompe-l'oeil Mural by Joshua Winer
- Elefount by Gary Hughes (Coronado)
- Flame of Friendship by Leonardo Nierman
- Gaspar De Portola monument by Billy Fitzgerald
- Geometric Cascade by Joan Irving
- Gloriett Bay Linear Park artwork (fountain) by James T. Hubbell (Coronado)
- Glorietta Bay Yacht Club Promenade artwork by Jon Koehler (Coronado)
- Green Fire by Robert Verhees
- Helicoid III by Robert Pietruszewski (2008) (National City)
- Historic Railcar Plaza by David Lathrop and Associates (2000) (National City)
- Homecoming by Stanley Bleifeld
- Illuminations by Mary Lynn Domiguez
- Le Bateau Ivre by Alber de Matteis (2008) (National City)
- Konoids by Kenneth Capps (1985) (Chula Vista Bayfront)
- Logan Heights historical murals by Dale Marsh/Tile Artisans
- Mermaids in a Shell by Linda Joanou
- Mini the Mermaid by Frank Mando
- Morning
- Ocean Dances by Kim Emerson
- National Salute to Bob Hope and the Military by Eugene Daub & Steven Whyte
- Ocean Riders by Wyland
- Ocean Song by Alber de Matteis
- Orange Tree by Guy Mayenobe
- Pacific Portal by James T. Hubbell (Shelter Island) aka Shelter Island Gazebo
- Pacific Spirit by James T. Hubbell (Shelter Island) (2002)
- Pearl of the Pacific fountain by James T. Hubbell (Shelter Island)
- Powering the Arts by Michael Leaf (205) (2001) (Chula Vista Bayfront)
- Remember Me by Ross Barrable (2001) (Chula Vista Bayfront)
- Ron McElliott Memorial Wind Harp by Ross Barrable (Chula Vista Bayfront)
- San Diego Synergy by Kent Kraber (2008) (Chula Vista Bayfront)
- School of Blue Bottlenoses by David Boyer (2009) (National City)
- Sea Dragon by Deana Mando (2006) (National City)
- Seat Light by James T. Hubbell (Shelter Island)
- Sheltering Wings by Christopher Slatoff
- Spirit of Imperial Beach sculpture by A. Wasil (Imperial Beach)
- Surfhenge by Malcolm Jones (Imperial Beach)
- Tails of the Big Bay by Annika Nelson
- Tap Root and Growth by Christopher Lee
- The Fish Tree by Zbigniew Pingot and Tobias Flores
- The Fisherman by Stephen Fairfield (2007) (Chula Vista Bayfront)
- Tunaman's Memorial by Franco Vianello (Shelter Island)
- USS San Diego (CL-53) Memorial by Eugene Daub & Louis Quaintance
- Urban Trees 1 (2003): 30 sculptures, various artists
- Urban Trees 2 (2005): 30 sculptures, various artists
- Urban Trees 3 (2006): 30 sculptures, various artists
- Urban Trees 4 (2007): 30 sculptures, various artists
- Urban Trees 5 (2008): 31 sculptures, various artists
- Urban Trees 6 (2009): 30 sculptures, various artists
- Wind Oars by George Peters & Melanie Walker (Chula Vista Bayfront) (2004)
- Yokohama Friendship Bell by Masahiko Katori (Shelter Island)
