= May S. Marcy Sculpture Garden =

Sculpture garden at the San Diego Museum of Art

Coordinates: 32.7318°N 117.1515°W

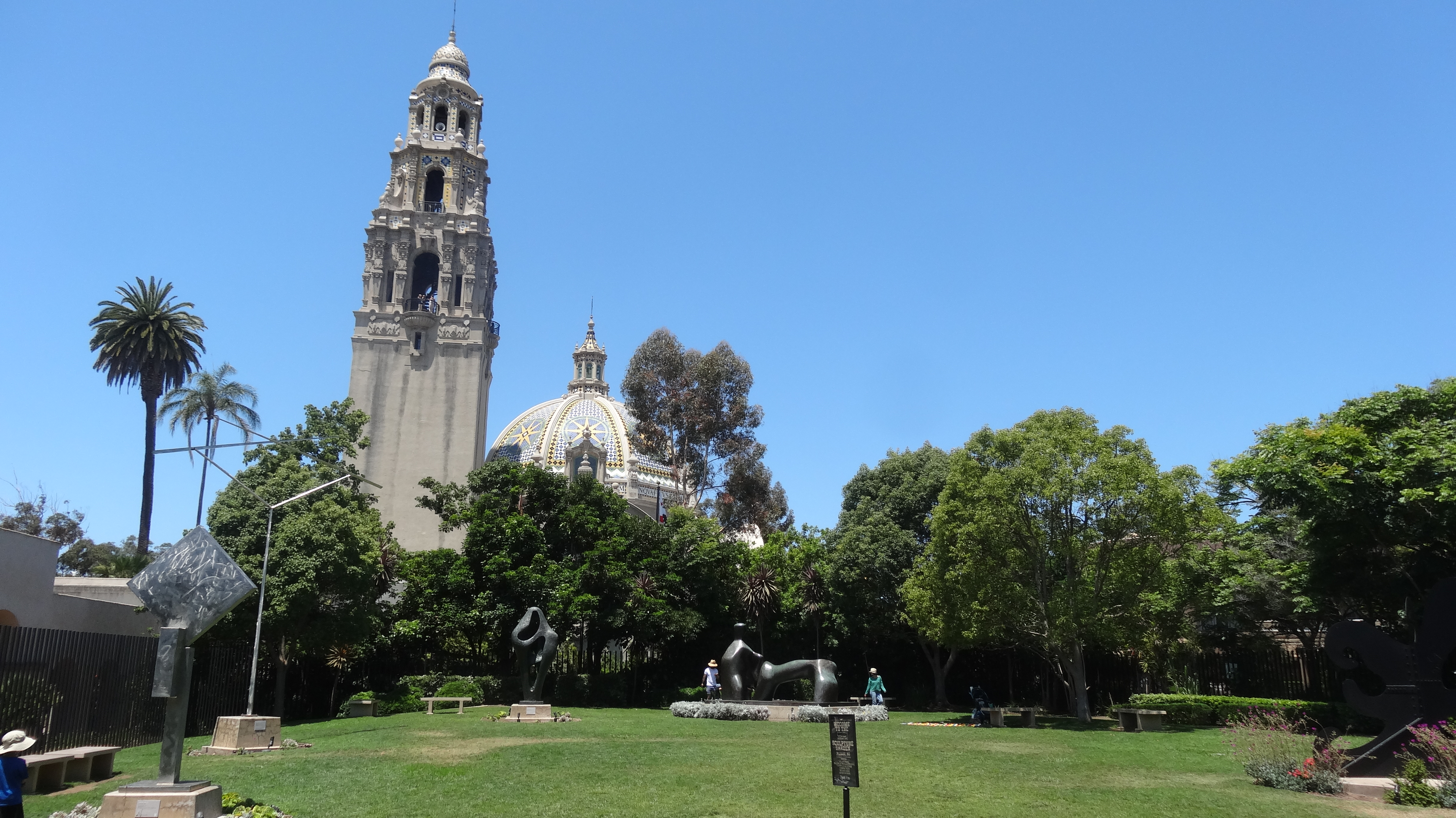
- sculpture garden at the San Diego Museum of Art
- Country: United States
- Location: Balboa Park, San Diego, California
- Opened: 1980
- Curator: San Diego Museum of Art
- Organiser: San Diego Museum of Art

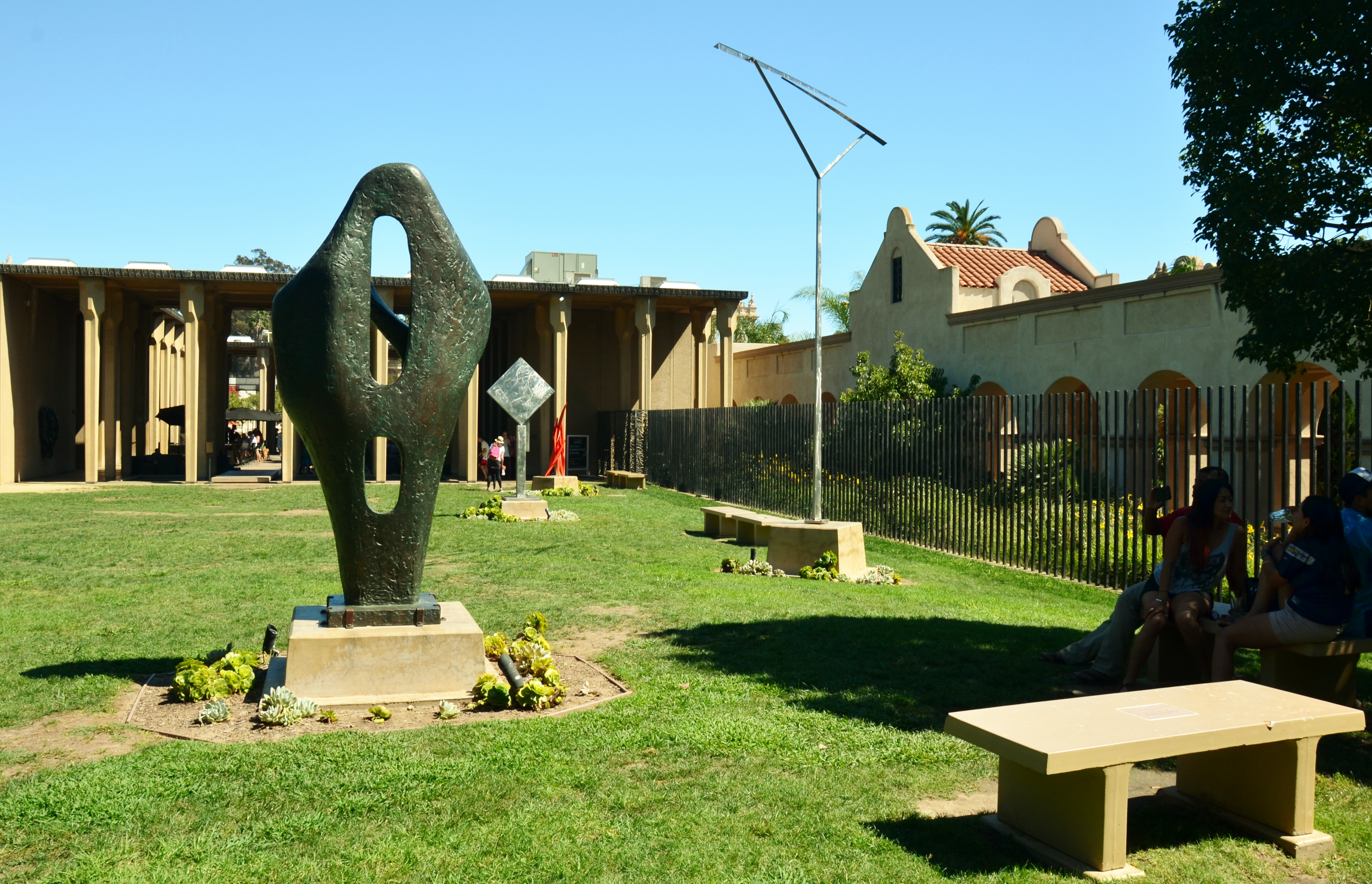
The garden in 2015

The May S. Marcy Sculpture Garden is a sculpture garden featuring 19th- and 20th-century modern and contemporary sculptures, located adjacent to the San Diego Museum of Art's West Wing in San Diego's Balboa Park, in the U.S. state of California.

== Works ==
Featured works include:

Photo	Sculpture	Artist	Year
	Aim I	Alexander Liberman	1980
	Big Open Skull	Jack Zajac	1966-73
	Border Crossing/Cruzando el Rio Bravo	Luis Jiménez	1989
	Cubi XV	David Smith	1963-64
	Foundation (Arqueologica) - Porcelain and various minerals	Fernando Casaempere	2019
	Figure for Landscape	Barbara Hepworth	1960
	Mother and Daughter Seated	Francisco Zúñiga	1971
	Night Presence II	Louise Nevelson	1976
	Odyssey III	Tony Rosenthal	1973
	The Prodigal Son	Auguste Rodin	1905
	Reclining Figure: Arch Leg	Henry Moore	1969
	Solar Bird	Joan Miró	1966-67
	Sonata Primitive	Saul Baizerman	1940-48
	Spinal Column	Alexander Calder	1968
	Two Lines Oblique: San Diego	George Rickey	1993
	Rain Mountain Galvanized steel,	Isamu Noguchi	1982
	The Watchers	Lynn Chadwick	1960
