= Alonzo Horton =

American real estate developer

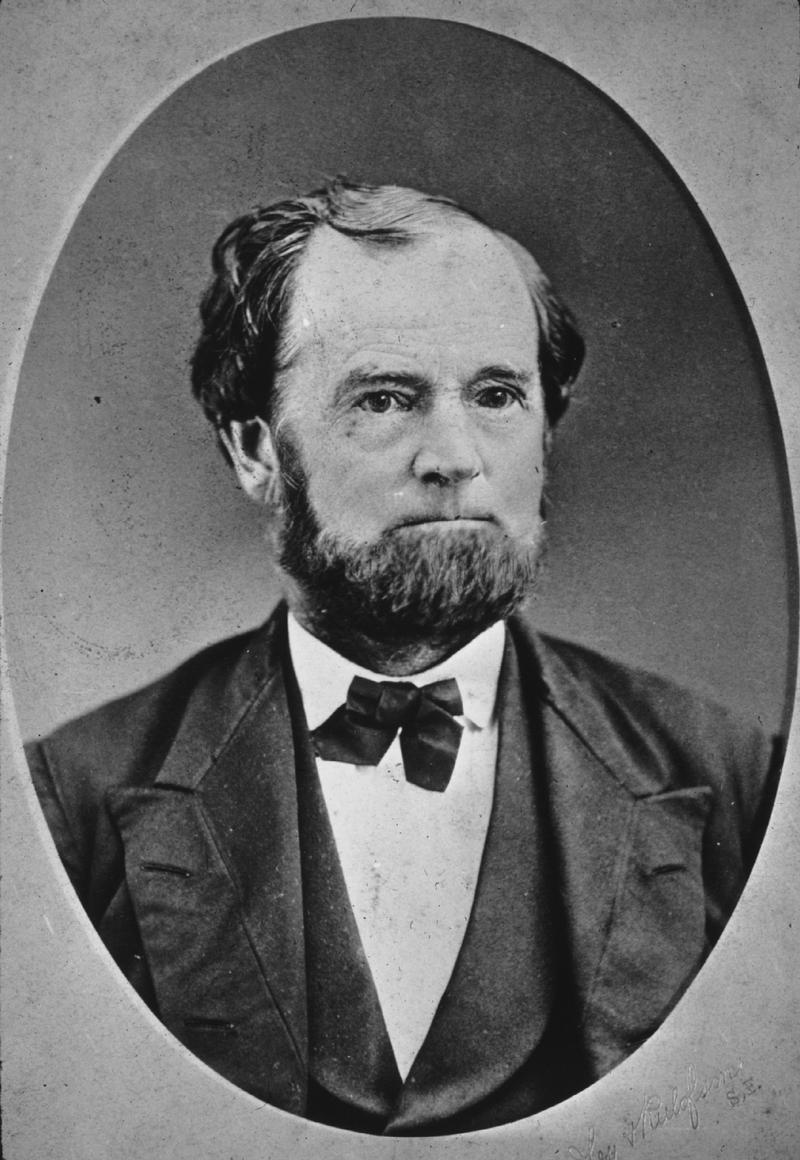
- Horton in 1867
- Born: Alonzo Eratus Horton; October 24, 1813; Union, Connecticut
- Died: 7 January 1909 (aged 95); San Diego, California

Alonzo Eratus Horton (October 24, 1813 – January 7, 1909) was an American real estate developer in the nineteenth century.

== Early life ==
Horton was born 1813 in Union, Connecticut, the scion of an old New England family, and grew up in Onondaga County, New York. By his 20s he had developed a keen entrepreneurial spirit, and in 1834, when he was 21, he began transporting grain by boat from the Lake Ontario port of Oswego, New York, to Canada. He also taught school there, and in 1834 ran for constable on the Whig ticket. But having developed a cough, and with his family and friends fearing tuberculosis, he was advised to move to the West. At that time, the Western frontier was Wisconsin, and in 1836 he moved to Milwaukee, Wisconsin.

A story was told that when Alonzo was eight years old and still living in New York he sold a pig for $1. By mistake, the man gave him $2. The next day Horton returned the $1. By coincidence, the two met again years later in Wisconsin, and the purchaser remembered the incident. He told a large group of citizens in Wisconsin. "I would trust Horton with everything I have in the world."

In 1847, after the American success in the Mexican–American War, Horton traveled to St. Louis, Missouri, then the gateway to the Western frontier, and by purchasing land warrants from veterans of that war, gained 1,500 acres (6 km^{2}) of land in the rural wilderness of northern Wisconsin. In 1848 he filed the first warrant for what would become the village of Hortonville, Wisconsin, in Outagamie County near Appleton, Wisconsin. Today, Hortonville is a village with a 2010 population of over 2,700.

In 1848 Horton filed his first Warrant in Green Bay, the County seat for Brown County which the area was a part of at that time, for 160 acres of land which is now "Downtown Hortonville". The price per acre at that time was only $.70. But before he could file he had to take an oath that he had seen and inspected the land and that no other settler resided on the land. To do so meant travelling by foot to inspect the land which was almost all dense woods with no trails. Then he had to go back to Green Bay by foot to file and return again. No easy task as the trip was around 40 miles and the area has many streams and rivers that he needed to cross along the way. After this he became a success at trading land, establishing businesses and cattle.

In 1851, with his town a success, Horton decided to join many in seeking his fortune in the gold fields of California. He sold his interests for $7,000, and traveled to El Dorado County, California, the heart of the Mother Lode. However, he became a success yet again not so much through gold, but through trading ice in the mining towns. In 1857, he returned to Wisconsin via Panama. During an Indian attack, he lost a bag of gold dust worth $10,000, but kept the money he had made trading ice.

During the late 1850s and early 1860s, Horton spent some time in the East, even marrying his second wife, a prominent New Jersey woman. Horton's first wife, whom he met in Wisconsin, had died of consumption. Horton is known to have married at least thrice, but relatives claimed he married about five times.

In 1862 Horton returned to California, this time to San Francisco, where he opened a furniture and household goods store at 6th and Market streets. While there he heard about growing settlement and interest in a small town called San Diego, located in far southern California, just north of the Mexico–United States border. It had become heavily acclaimed for its dry, warm, healthy climate, very welcome to many cold-weary Easterners. After a lecture about the ports of California, he later recalled his excitement, "I could not sleep at night for thinking about San Diego, and at 2 in the morning, I got up and looked on a map to see where San Diego was, and then went back to bed satisfied. In the morning, I said to my wife, I am going to sell my goods and go to San Diego and build a city." Upon visiting there, he noticed that while the small town was built around the old Spanish presidio (fortress) well inland near the mouth of the San Diego River, no large settlements had been made along the large San Diego Bay just a few miles south, even though all ships sailing to the town docked in the bay.

== The New San Diego ==
In 1867, Horton sold off his merchandise in San Francisco and journeyed to San Diego. There he bought 960 acres (3.9 km^{2}) of land on San Diego Bay for just 27½ cents an acre ($67.95/km^{2}), which became known as "Horton's Addition." Earlier pioneer William Heath Davis was the original founder of San Diego's "New Town", about 12 years before Horton appeared on the scene. "New Town" did not flourish because of lack of freshwater. "Horton's Addition" adjoined the already existing Davis "New Town" subdivision. New businesses began to flood into the "Horton's Addition" due to the promise of a rail connection from the harbor to the east. Eventually, the new addition began to eclipse Old Town in importance as the heart of the growing city. Local land exploded in price throughout the 1880s, making Horton a success yet again. Horton helped to establish San Diego's Chamber of Commerce in an effort to further expand the developing city. In 1867, Horton was the first person to ask for a public city park to be developed, which later became Balboa Park. When the U.S. Congress withdrew its proposed aid to bring the Texas Pacific Railroad into San Diego, the progress of the city froze. Many of the workers in the city had paid Horton a large down payment on their property of 1/3rd the value, and offered to surrender the sum along with the property if Horton would only release them from the contract. Instead, Horton is said to have canceled the contract of anyone who asked, and returned all the money paid, at a great personal loss. Eventually, the California Southern Railroad (now a part of BNSF Railway) became the first line to connect the city with the rest of America's rail network in 1885. But land values crashed in the late 1880s, devastating much of Horton's fortune. By the time he died in 1909, he had lost much of his former wealth.

== Personal life ==
Horton went down in history as a tireless, enthusiastic supporter of the interests of whatever locality he happened to be living in. Saying after moving to Wisconsin and founding the village of "Hortonville" as one of its first settlers in 1848, "My principle is to be as happy as I can every day, to try and make everyone else as happy as I can, and to try to make no one unhappy." Today, the village of Hortonville, Wisconsin honors its founder with "Alonzo Park", one of three parks in the small town.

He also had an effect on San Diego's political scene; when he moved there in late 1860s, most locals, many of whom had migrated from the South or the border states, had supported the South during the Civil War and were Copperheads, or Democratic sympathizers of the Confederacy in an officially Union state. Upon being told that San Diego was a "Copperhead hole", Horton remarked, "Then I shall make it a Republican hole," and encouraged strong Republican sentiment in the city's newspapers.

Horton was one of San Diego's first Unitarians. He helped found the first Unitarian church in San Diego.

Horton died at age 96 in Agnew Sanitarium, San Diego. He is buried at Mount Hope Cemetery.

Horton Plaza Park in downtown San Diego was named for him.

== See also ==
- Statue of Alonzo Horton
