= Seated Yucatan Woman =

Seated Yucatán Woman
- Artist: Francisco Zúñiga
- Year: 1973
- Type: Bronze
- Dimensions: 105.4 cm × 89.9 cm × 114.0 cm (41 1/2 in × 35 3/8 in × 44 7/8 in)
- Location: Washington, D.C., United States; 38.889117°N 77.022683°W
- Owner: Smithsonian Institution

Seated Yucatán Woman is a bronze sculpture, by Francisco Zúñiga. It is an edition of four, one of which is located at the Hirshhorn Museum and Sculpture Garden.

The artist depicts the grace and dignity of peasant women in Mexico.

According to Ariel Zuñiga, the correct title of the piece is Juchiteca sentada (Seated Juchiteca).

== See also ==
- List of public art in Washington, D.C., Ward 2
