= Reclining Figure: Arch Leg =

Sculpture by Henry Moore

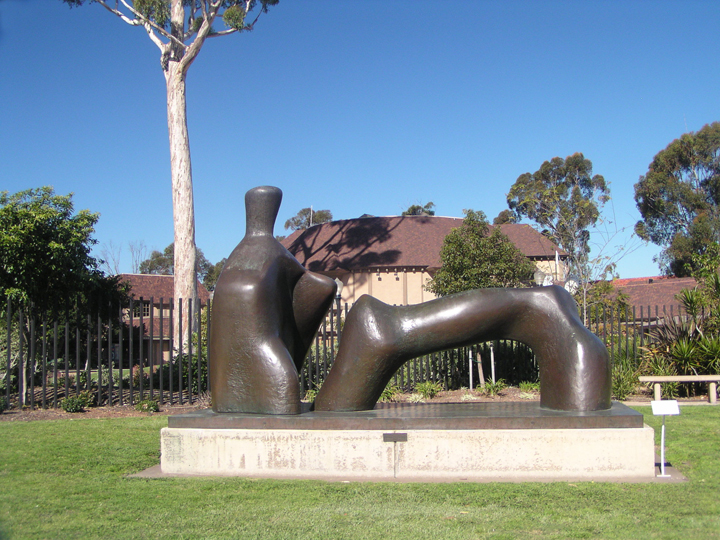
- The sculpture in San Diego in 2006
- Artist: Henry Moore
- Year: 1969-1970
- Catalogue: LH 610
- Medium: Bronze
- Dimensions: 442 cm (174 in)
- Location: San Diego Museum of Art Tehran Museum of Contemporary Art; Berardo Collection Museum Musée d'Art et d'Histoire (Geneva)

Reclining Figure: Arch Leg is a sculpture by Henry Moore.

== Casts ==
One bronze, cast in 1969, is installed at the San Diego Museum of Art's May S. Marcy Sculpture Garden, in the U.S. state of California. Two others are in Iran, part of the collection of the Tehran Museum of Contemporary Art, and the Museu Coleção Berardo in Lisbon, Portugal. Another bronze, signed 4/6, is owned by the Musée d'Art et d'Histoire in Geneva.

== See also ==
- List of sculptures by Henry Moore
