= Fountain of Two Oceans =

Fountain and sculpture in San Diego, California, U.S.

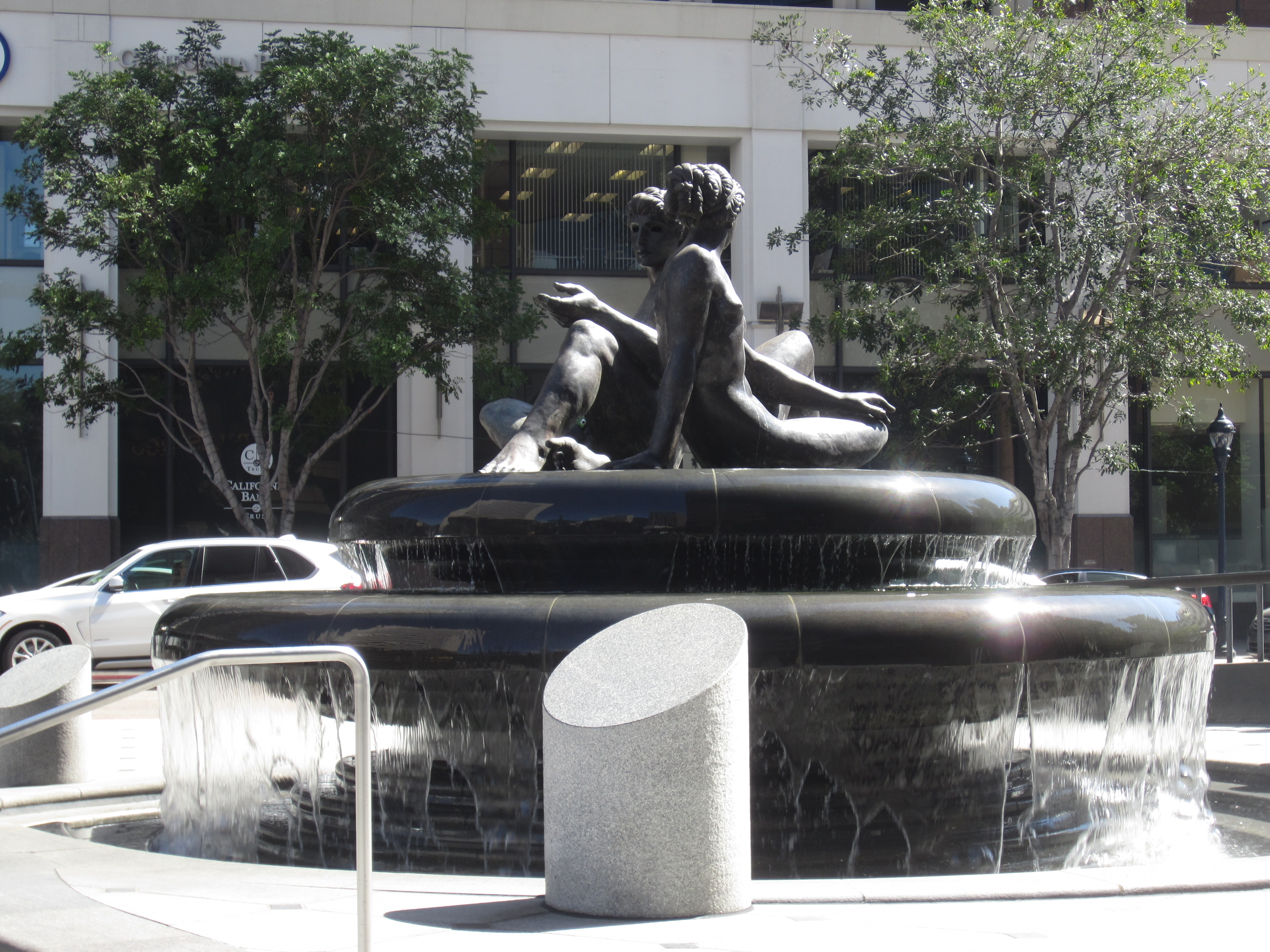
- The fountain in 2016
- Artist: Sergio Benvenuti
- Year: 1984
- Location: San Diego, California, U.S.
- 32°43′03″N 117°09′37″W

Fountain of Two Oceans is an outdoor 1984 fountain and sculpture by Sergio Benvenuti, installed in San Diego, in the U.S. state of California. It features a nude man and woman facing one another.

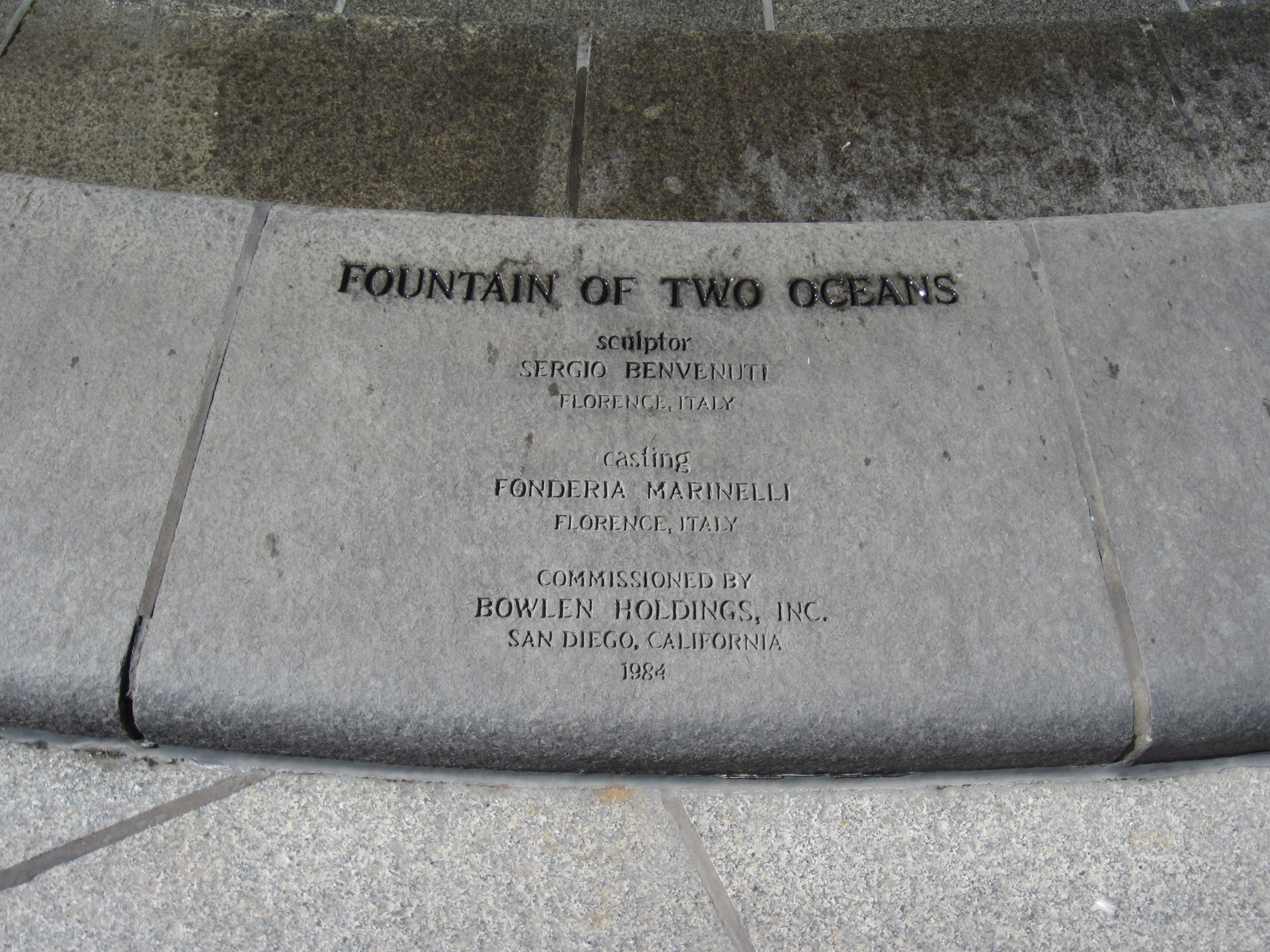
Inscription, 2016

== See also ==
- 1984 in art
