= Border Crossing/Cruzando el Rio Bravo =

Sculpture by Luis Jiménez

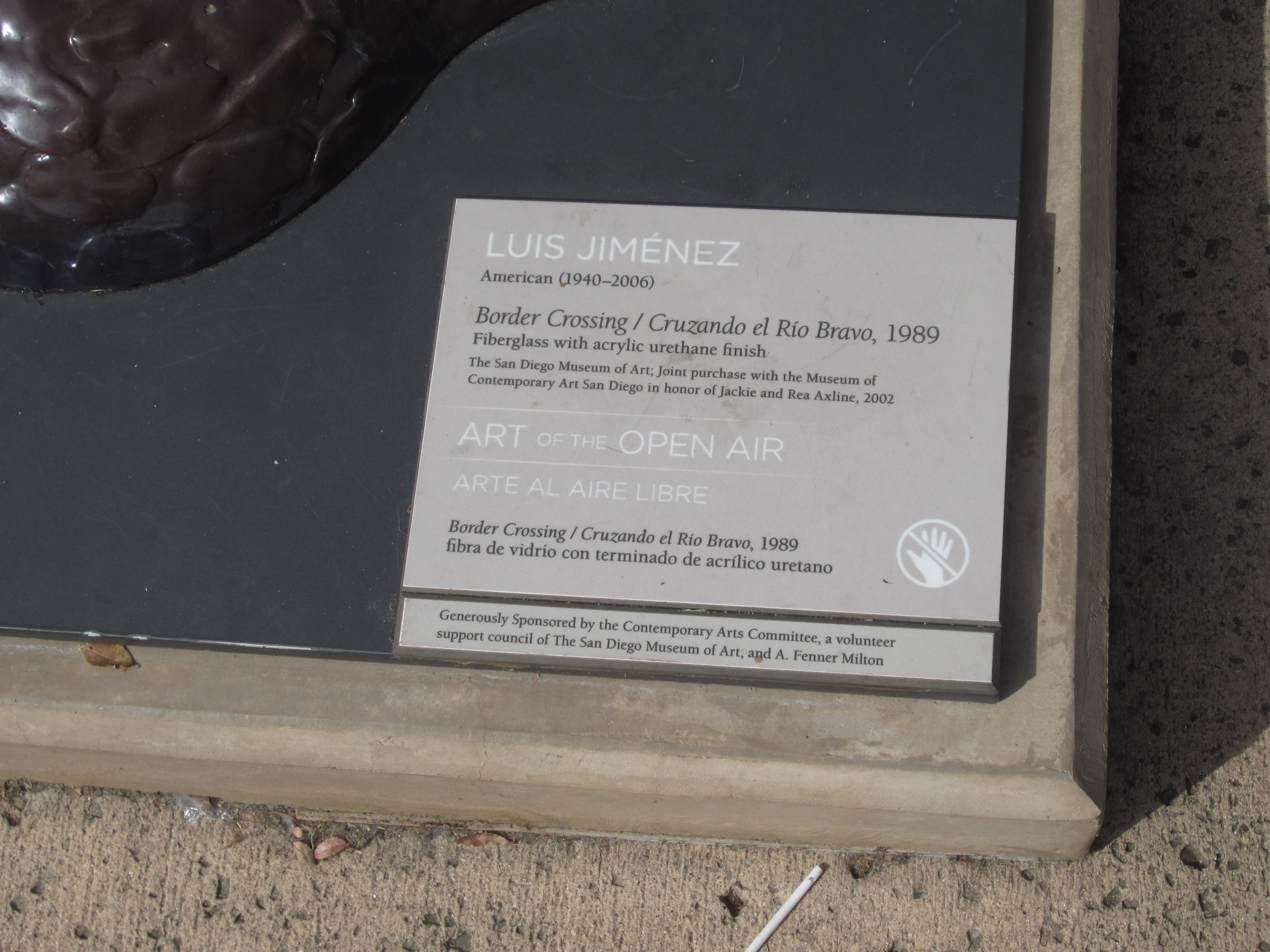
Plaque for the San Diego sculpture

Border Crossing/Cruzando el Rio Bravo, or Border Crossing (Cruzando el Rio Bravo), is a sculpture by Luis Jiménez. It depicts a Mexican man carrying his wife and their baby on his shoulders as they cross the Rio Grande.

One fiberglass copy, completed in 1989, was purchased by the Museum of Contemporary Art San Diego and the San Diego Museum of Art and installed in the May S. Marcy Sculpture Garden. Others are part of the collections of the Blanton Museum of Art (Austin, Texas), the Museum of Fine Arts, Houston, and the New Mexico Museum of Art (Santa Fe, New Mexico). Two others are installed at Iowa State University in Ames, Iowa, and The University of Texas at San Antonio.

== See also ==
- 1989 in art
