= Dream (Salas) =

Public artwork by Roberto Salas in San Diego, California, U.S.

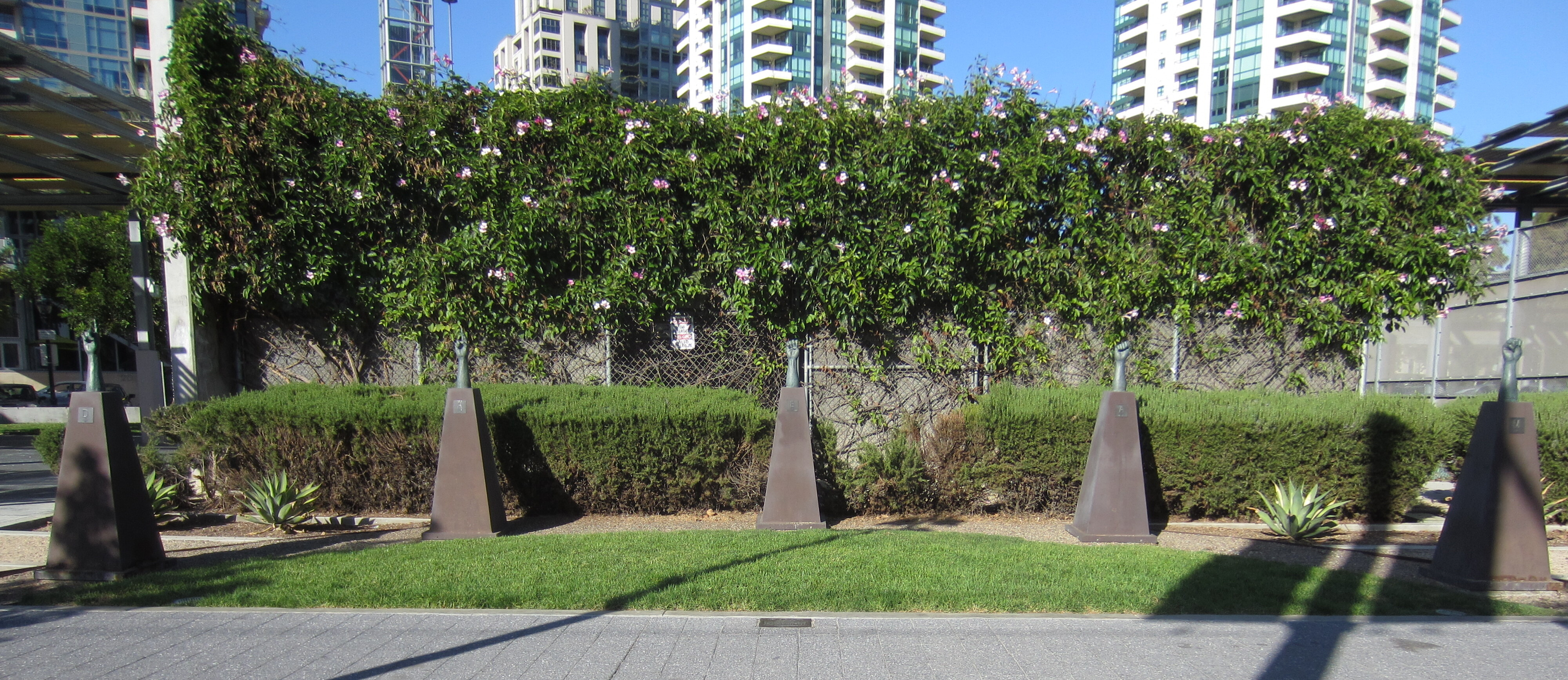
- The art installation in 2016
- Artist: Roberto Salas
- Year: 2001
- Location: San Diego, California, United States
- 32°42′36″N 117°09′55″W

Dream is an outdoor 2001 public artwork by Roberto Salas, installed along San Diego's Martin Luther King Jr. Promenade, in the U.S. state of California. The work, which includes five bronze hand sculptures, is one of several commemorating Martin Luther King Jr. along the promenade, including Melv Edwards' Breaking of the Chains and Shedding the Cloak by Jerry and Tama Dumlao and Mary Lynn Dominguez.

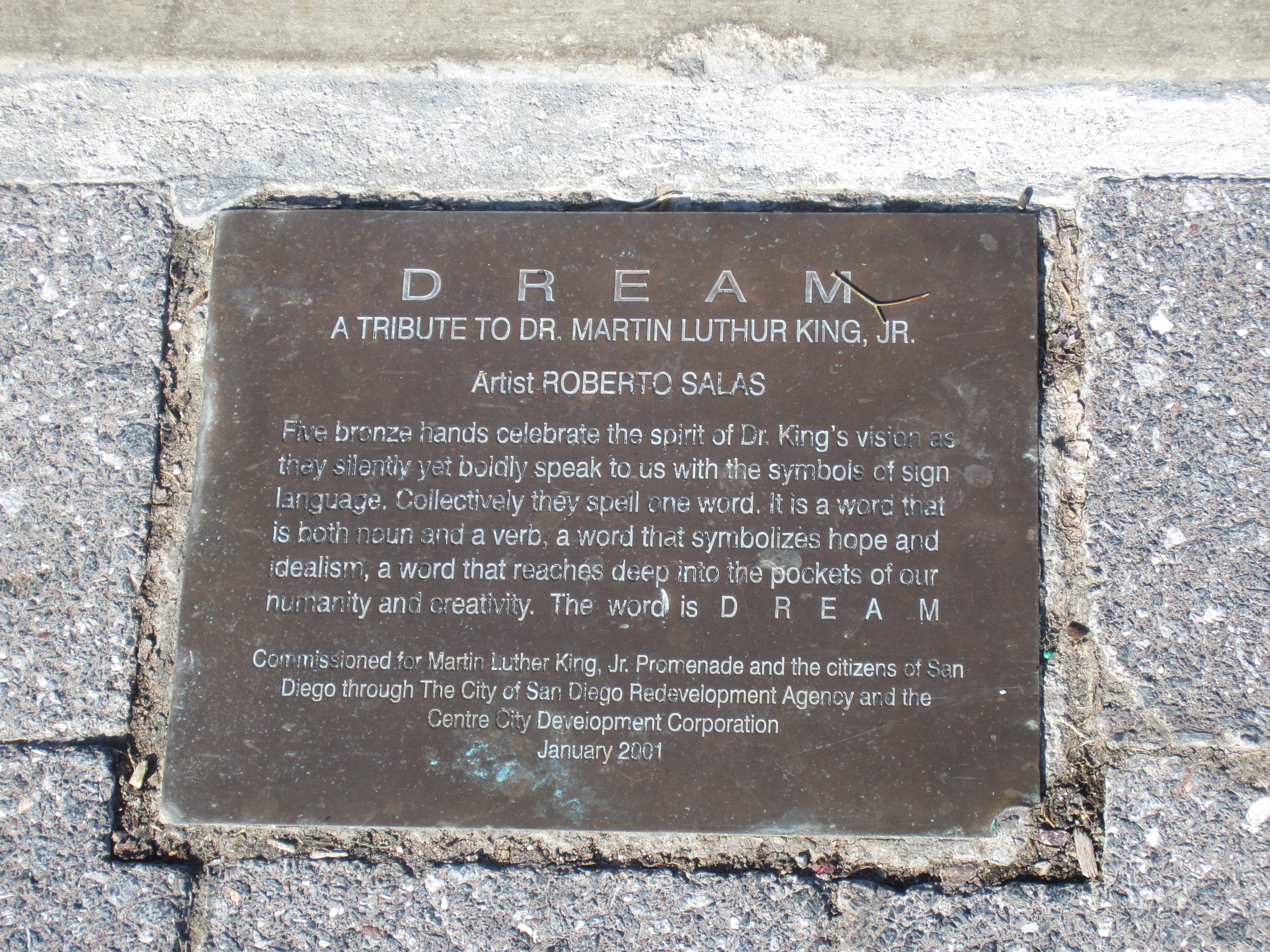
Plaque for the sculpture, 2016

== See also ==
- 2001 in art
