= Bow Wave (sculpture) =

Fountain and sculpture in San Diego, California, U.S.

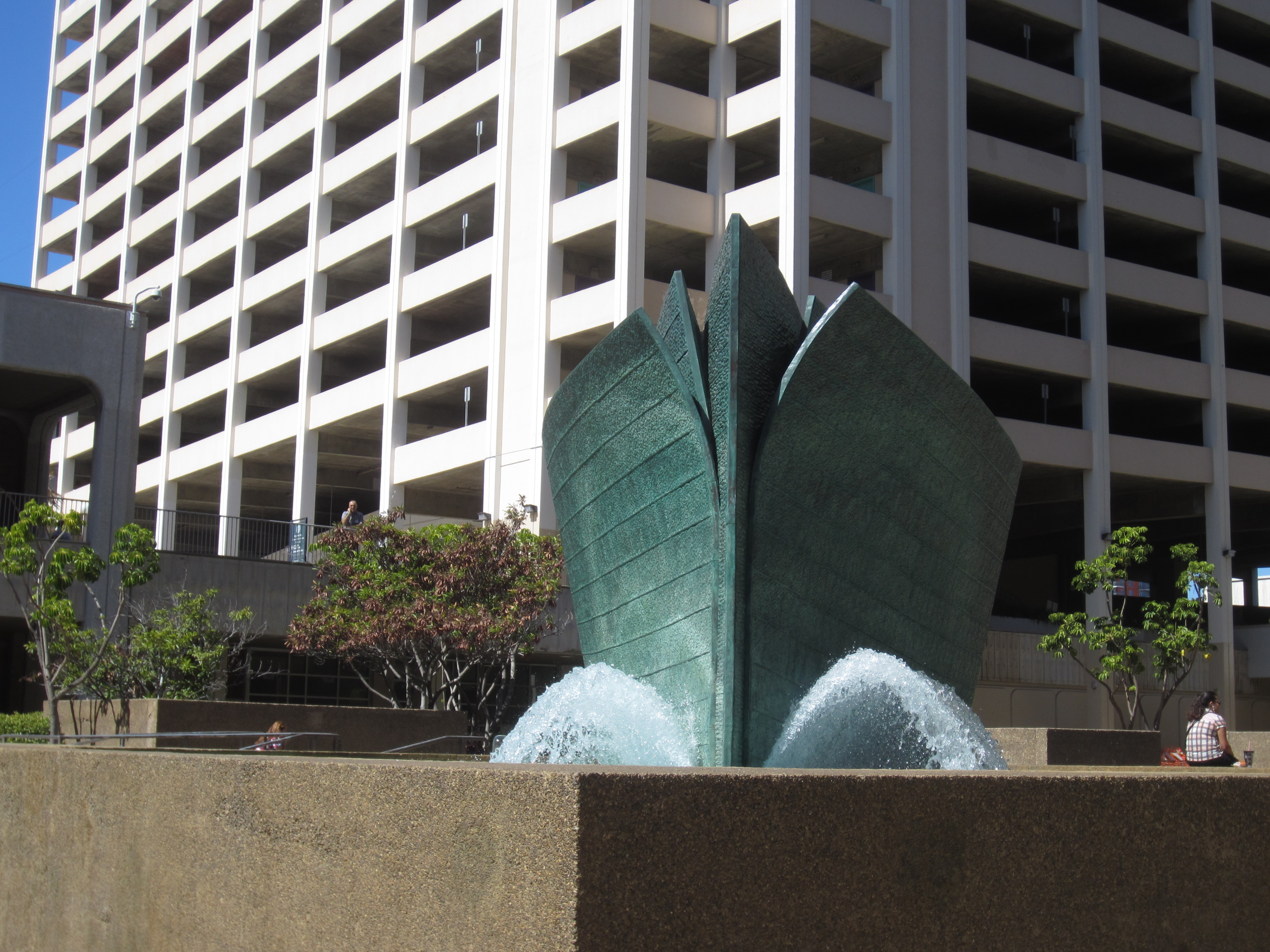
- The sculpture in 2016
- Artist: Malcolm Leland
- Year: 1972
- Type: Sculpture
- Location: San Diego, California, U.S.; 32°43′04″N 117°09′46″W

Bow Wave is an outdoor fountain and sculpture by Malcolm Leland, installed at San Diego's Civic Center Plaza, in the U.S. state of California, in 1972.

== See also ==
- 1972 in art
