= Two Lines Oblique: San Diego =

Sculpture in San Diego, California, U.S.

- Artist: George Rickey
- Year: 1993
- Location: San Diego Museum of Art, San Diego, California, United States

Two Lines Oblique: San Diego is an outdoor 1993 stainless steel sculpture by George Rickey, installed in the San Diego Museum of Art's May S. Marcy Sculpture Garden, in the U.S. state of California.

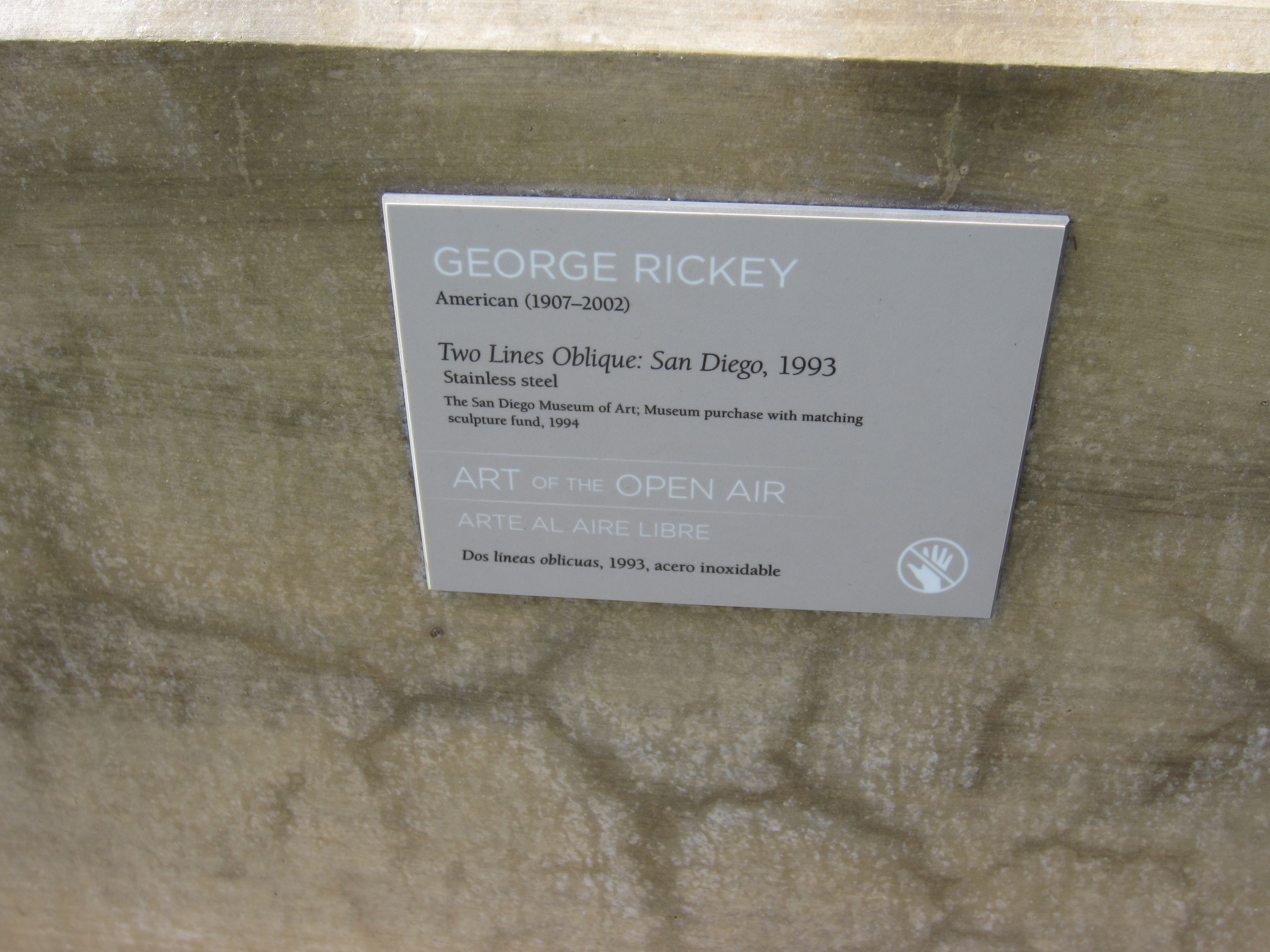

== See also ==
- 1993 in art
