= Statue of Alonzo Horton =

Statue in San Diego, California, U.S.

Alonzo E. Horton
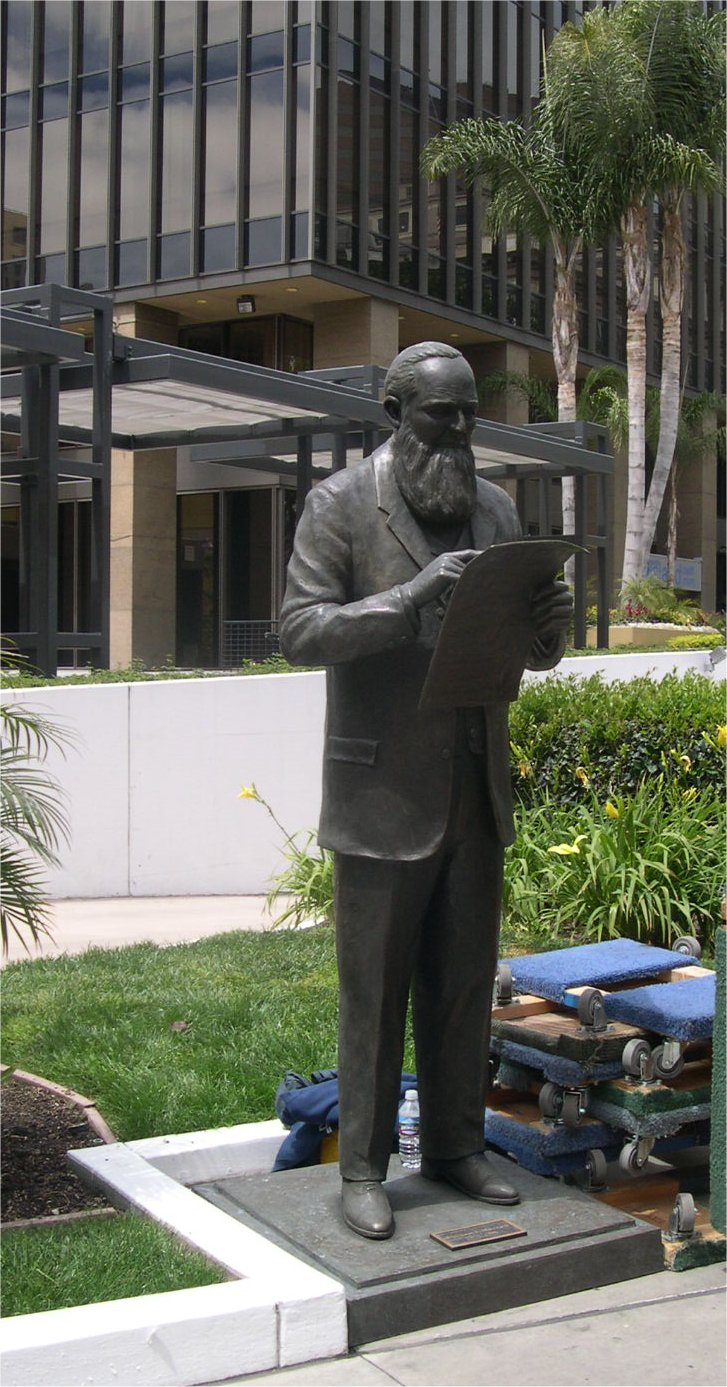
- The statue in 2006
- Medium: Sculpture
- Subject: Alonzo Horton
- Location: San Diego, California, U.S.; 32°42′53″N 117°09′44″W

Alonzo E. Horton is a statue of the American real estate developer Alonzo Horton, installed at the intersection of Third Avenue and E Street (Broadway Circle), in San Diego, California.
