= Spinal Column (sculpture) =

Sculpture by Alexander Calder in San Diego, California, U.S.

- The sculpture in 2016
- Artist: Alexander Calder
- Year: 1968
- Type: Sculpture
- Dimensions: 3.0 m × 2.5 m × 2.3 m (118 in × 100 in × 90 in)
- Location: San Diego Museum of Art; San Diego, California, U.S.; 32°43′54.8″N 117°9′5.3″W

Spinal Column is a 1968 sculpture by Alexander Calder. It was commissioned for the San Diego Museum of Art in 1968 and was displayed in the May S. Marcy Sculpture Garden before being installed outside the museum. The work measures 118 in. x 100 in. x 90 in.

== See also ==
- 1968 in art
- List of Alexander Calder public works
