= Night Presence II =

Sculpture in San Diego, California, U.S.

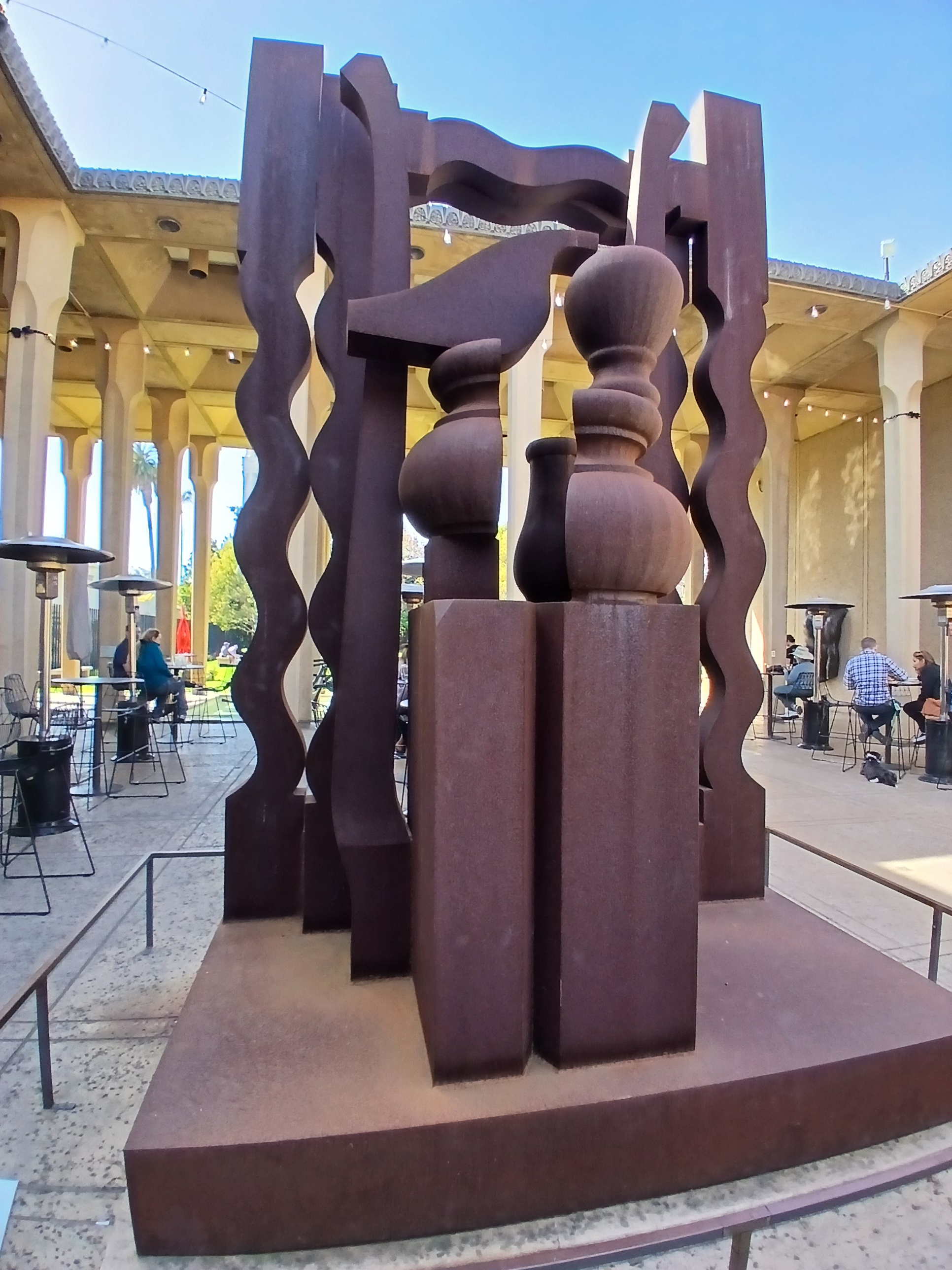
- Artist: Louise Nevelson
- Year: 1976
- Medium: Cor-Ten steel sculpture
- Location: San Diego Museum of Art, San Diego, California, U.S.
- 32°43′54.4″N 117°9′4.1″W

Night Presence II is an outdoor 1976 welded Cor-Ten steel sculpture by Louise Nevelson, installed at the San Diego Museum of Art's May S. Marcy Sculpture Garden, in the U.S. state of California.

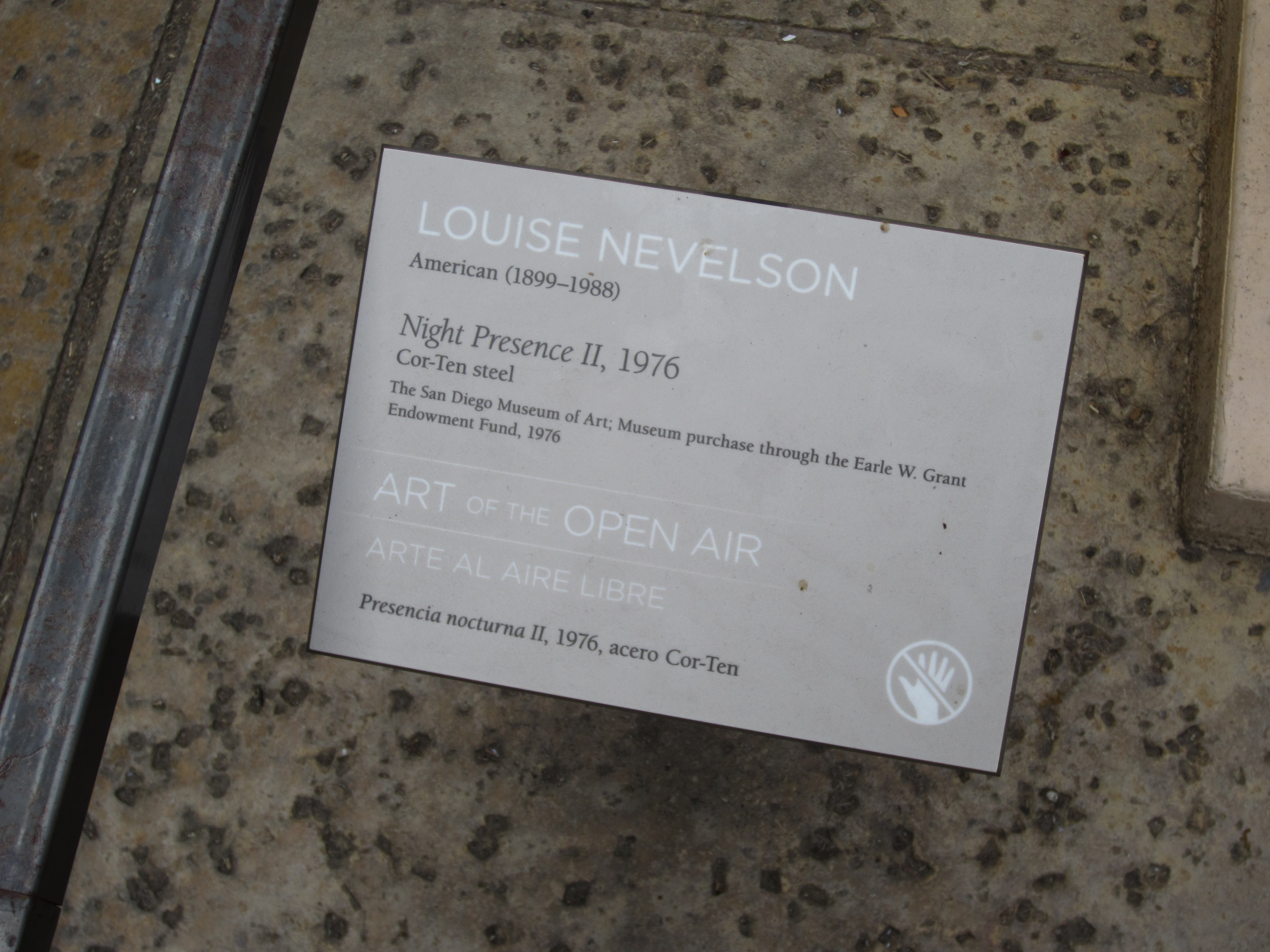

== See also ==
- 1976 in art
- List of Louise Nevelson public art works
