= Aim I =

Sculpture by Alexander Liberman in San Diego, California, U.S.

- Artist: Alexander Liberman
- Year: 1980
- Location: San Diego, California, U.S.
- 32°43′54″N 117°09′05″W

Aim I is an outdoor 1980 aluminum sculpture by Alexander Liberman, installed at the San Diego Museum of Art's May S. Marcy Sculpture Garden, in the U.S. state of California.

== See also ==
- 1980 in art
