= Shedding the Cloak =

Public artwork in San Diego, California, U.S.

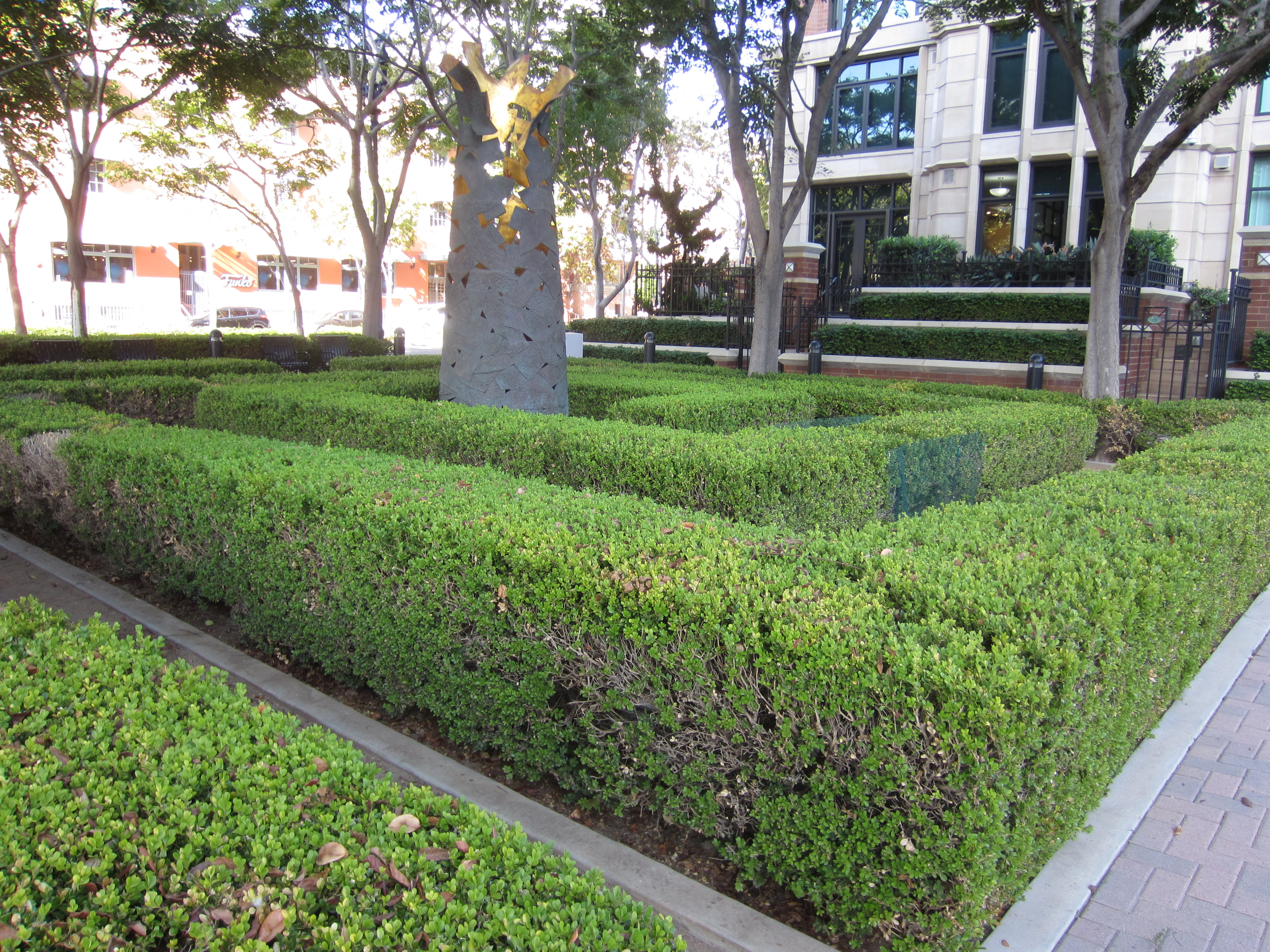
- The art installation in 2016
- Artist: Jerry Dumlao; Tama Dumlao; Mary Lynn Dominguez
- Year: 2001
- Location: San Diego, California, U.S.
- 32°42′41″N 117°10′03″W

Shedding the Cloak is an outdoor 2001 public artwork by Jerry and Tama Dumlao and Mary Lynn Dominguez, installed along San Diego's Martin Luther King Jr. Promenade, in the U.S. state of California. The work is one of several commemorating Martin Luther King Jr. along the promenade, including Melvin Edwards' Breaking of the Chains and Roberto Salas' Dream.

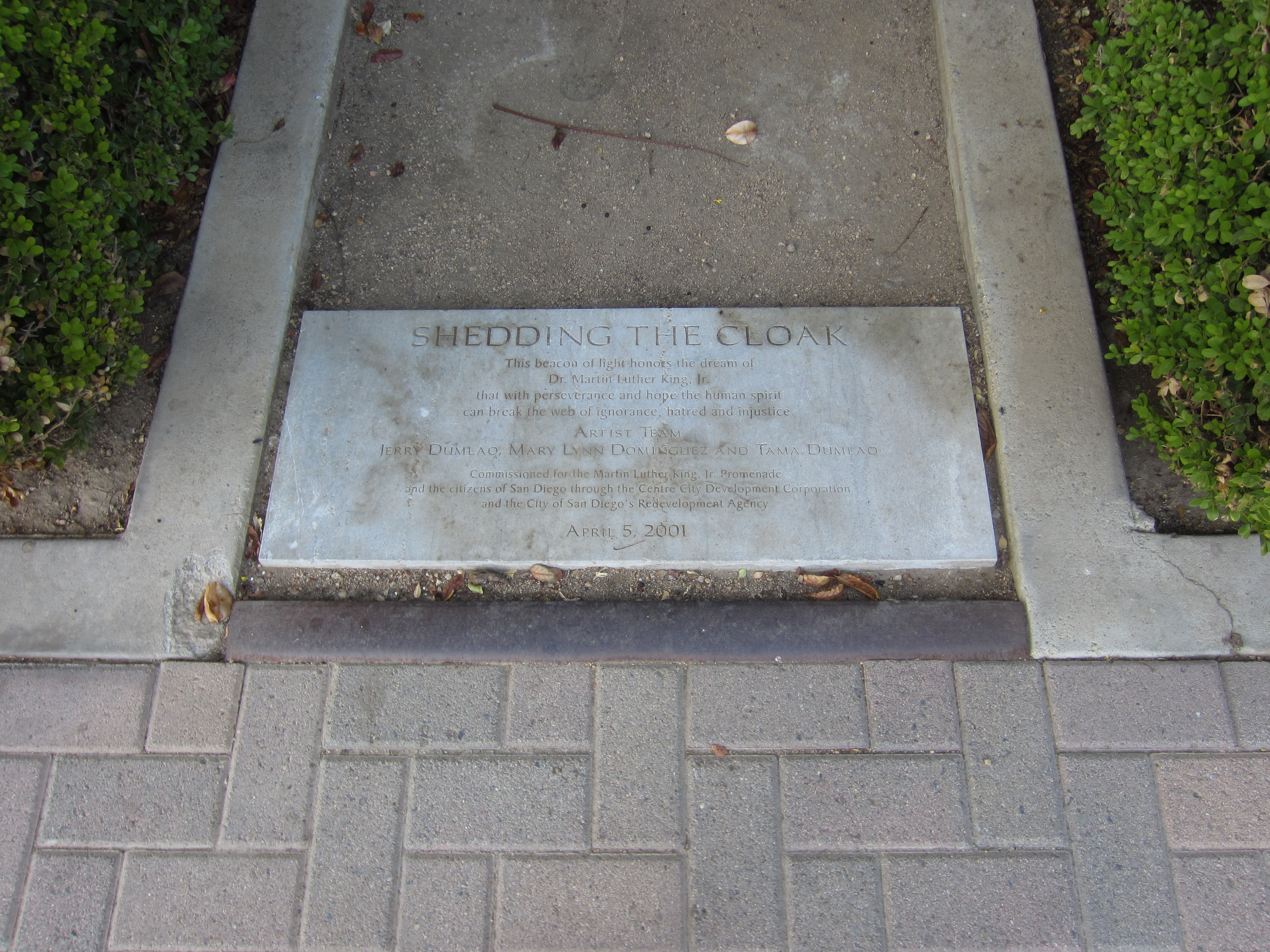
Plaque for the sculpture, 2016

== See also ==
- 2001 in art
