= Jack Zajac =

American sculptor (born 1929)

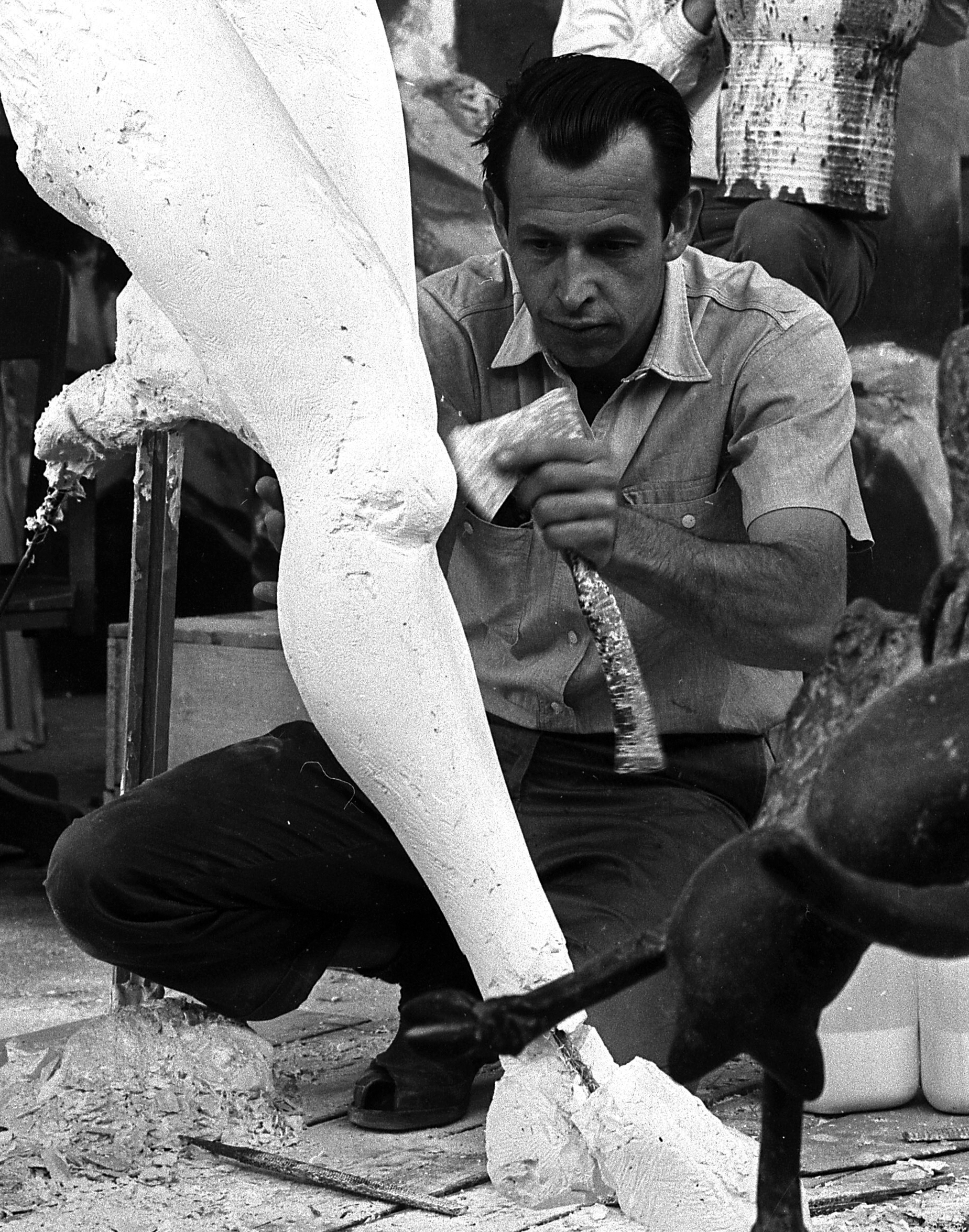
- Zajac in 1961
- Born: December 13, 1929 (age 96); Youngstown, Ohio
- Education: Scripps College
- Known for: Sculpture, Painting
- Movement: West Coast Romantic Surrealism

'Ram's Skull and Horn', bronze sculpture by Jack Zajac, 1976, Honolulu Museum of Art

Jack Zajac (born December 13, 1929) is a Californian West Coast artist who has been concerned with the “Romantic Surrealist tradition”.

”To have a message or an emotional stimulation soaked up by an uncertainty of the Artist’s tool — color — shape — form — which are the punctuation of his message, is a discouraging thing. This is the kind of anemia I’m trying to eliminate.”

== Biography ==
Jack Zajac is an American artist who was born December 13, 1929, in Youngstown, Ohio. In 1946, his family moved to southern California. After he graduated from high school, he got a job at Kaiser Steel Mill. This employment helped finance his study of art at Scripps College in Claremont, California, from 1949 to 1953. Though Zajac studied art with Millard Sheets at Scripps College, and was a member of the art community that developed in Claremont, California during the mid-20th century, he was admitted as a special, non-degree seeking student. The reason that he was not admitted as a regular student was because Scripps College was then, and remains today, a women's college. Jack Zajac is married to artist, Corda Eby. They have two children, Aaron Zajac and Christian Zajac and three grandchildren, Camille Zajac, Phoebe Zajac and Jack Zajac. His son, Christian Zajac and granddaughter, Camille Zajac are both artists.

== Honors ==
In 1948, Zajac won a scholarship at a California State Fair student exhibition in Sacramento. He was named recipient of the Purchase Prize at the Pasadena Art Museum in 1950, which led to his first one-man exhibit. He is known for his sculptures in bronze and marble, as well as his figurative paintings. He received a Guggenheim Fellowship and the Rome Prize. He is a member of The American Academy of Arts and Letters and the National Academy of Design. He has been an Artist in Residence at the American Academy in Rome, Dartmouth College and the University of California, Santa Cruz.

== Selected solo exhibitions ==
- 1951, 53, 54, 56, 58, 60, 62, 64, 67, 69: Felix Landau Gallery;
- 1951: Pasadena Art Museum;
- 1953: Santa Barbara Museum of Art;
- 1955: Scripps College, Claremont, CA;
- 1955, 61: Schneider Gallery, Rome, Italy;
- 1956: John Young Gallery, Honolulu, HI;
- 1957: Il Segno, Rome;
- 1960: Downtown Gallery, New York, NY;
- 1960, 63: Devorah Sherman Gallery, Chicago, IL;
- 1960: Roland, Browse and Delbanco, London, England;
- 1961: Bolles Gallery, San Francisco, CA;
- 1963: Mills College, Oakland, CA; California Palace of the Legion of Honor, San Francisco, CA; Galleria Pogliani, Rome;
- 1965: Newport Pavilion Gallery, Balboa, CA;
- 1966, 68: Landau-Alan Gallery, New York, NY;
- 1967: Gallery Marcus, Laguna Beach, CA;
- 1968: Alpha Gallery, Boston, MA;
- 1970: Fairweather Hardin Gallery, Chicago, IL;
- 1971, 74, 78, 83: Forum Gallery, New York, NY;
- 1972, 76: Margherita Gallery, Rome, Italy;
- 1973, 75, 77: Jodi Scully Gallery, Los Angeles[;
- 1973: L’Obelisco Gallery, Rome, Italy;
- 1976: Maitani Gallery, Orvieto, Italy;
- 1974, 77: James Willis Gallery, San Francisco, CA;
- 1977: Zara Gallery, San Jose, CA;
- 1979, 83: Mekler Gallery, Los Angeles;
- 1980: Cedar Street Gallery, Santa Cruz, CA;
- 1983, 87: Bound Goats, Santa Cruz Series, Forum Gallery, NY;
- 1984, 87: Stephen Wirtz Gallery, San Francisco, CA;
- 1989 90: Jan Turner Gallery, Los Angeles;

== Selected retrospectives ==
- 1953, 75: Santa Barbara Museum of Art, Santa Barbara, CA;
- 1968: The Galleries of Temple University Tyler School of Art in Rome;
- 1970: Jaffe-Friede Gallery, Dartmouth College;
- 1977: Palm Springs Desert Museum, Palm Desert, CA;
- 1978: California State University, Los Angeles;
- 1981: Fresno Arts Center, Fresno, CA;
- 1984: El Paso Museum of Art, El Paso, TX;
- 1990: Oakland Museum, Oakland, CA.

== Selected group exhibitions ==
- 1950: "Artists You Should Know", Los Angeles Art Association;
- 1951: Pennsylvania Academy of Fine Arts;
- 1952: University of Illinois;
- 1955: São Paulo Biennale; Carnegie International;
- 1956: "New Talent, U.S.A., Recent Drawings U.S.A.", Museum of Modern Art, New York;
- 1957: "Young America", Whitney Museum of American Art, New York City;
- 1958: "Festival of Two Worlds", Spoleto, Italy; "Ten Americans Living Abroad", University of Wisconsin;
- 1957, 59: Santa Barbara Museum of Art Biennial;
- 1959,60: Los Angeles County Museum Annual;
- 1959: Whitney Museum of American Art Annual; 63rd American Exhibition, Art Institute of Chicago; "Recent Sculpture, U.S.A.", Museum of Modern Art, New York;
- 1960: "Liturgical Art", Arts Club of Chicago; "American Sculpture", Galerie Claude Bernard, Paris, France; American Academy in Rome Annual;
- 1961: "Drawings by Sculptors", Smithsonian Institution, Washington, DC;
- 1962: "Modern Sculpture from the "Joseph H. Hirshhorn Collection", Solomon R. Guggenheim Museum, New York City; "American Painters Today", circ., Whitney Museum of American Art, Los Angeles County Museum and twenty others; "Fifty California Artists", Whitney Museum of American Art; "Some Directions in Modern Sculpture", Providence Art Club, Providence, RI; "American Painting 1962", Virginia Museum of Fine Arts, Richmond, VA; "Recent Painting U.S.A.: The Figure", Museum of Modern Art, New York City;
- 1962-1963: "The Artist’s Environment: The West Coast", Amon Carter Museum Fort Worth, TX; U.C.L.A. Art Galleries; Oakland Art Museum, Oakland, CA;
- 1963: "Chadwick, Moore, Zajac: Small Works, M. Knoedler & Co.", NYC;
- 2015: "Art of the Open Air": The San Diego Museum of Art, Balboa Park

== Works in museums and public collections ==
He is best known for his bronze sculptures that resemble animal skulls, such as Big Open Skull (1966–1973), sited in front of the San Diego Museum of Art, and Ram's Skull and Horn, installed in a courtyard of the Honolulu Museum of Art. Cowell College at UC Santa Cruz, the Hirshhorn Museum and Sculpture Garden, the Honolulu Museum of Art, the Israel Museum, The J Paul Getty Museum, Museum of Modern Art, the Nelson-Atkins Museum of Art, Palm Springs Art Museum, the Pasadena Museum of California Art, the Pennsylvania Academy of the Fine Arts, the Santa Barbara Museum of Art, the San Jose Museum of Art, the Wildling Museum and the Walker Art Center are among the public collections holding works by Jack Zajac.
