= Figure for Landscape =

Sculpture by Barbara Hepworth

- Figure for Landscape in 2018
- Artist: Barbara Hepworth
- Year: 1960
- Medium: Bronze

Figure for Landscape is a bronze sculpture by Barbara Hepworth, modeled in 1960.

Seven castings were made; they are in the Barbara Hepworth Museum (Tate St Ives), Hirshhorn Museum and Sculpture Garden, Yorkshire Sculpture Park, University of Exeter, J. Paul Getty Museum, the San Diego Museum of Art. and Stavanger Kunstforening, Norway.

The sculpture in Stavanger was placed outside Stavanger Kunstforening in 1965, when Dame Hepworth decided to sell it at less than half price to ensure that one of her works was placed in Norway. In the spring of 2014 the Stavanger Kunstforening decided to sell the sculpture to improve their financial situation, a decision which has created an uproar in the city of Stavanger. The sculpture was sold at Auction by Christie's to a client of Stephen Ongpin, a London art dealer, for $4.17 million including commission

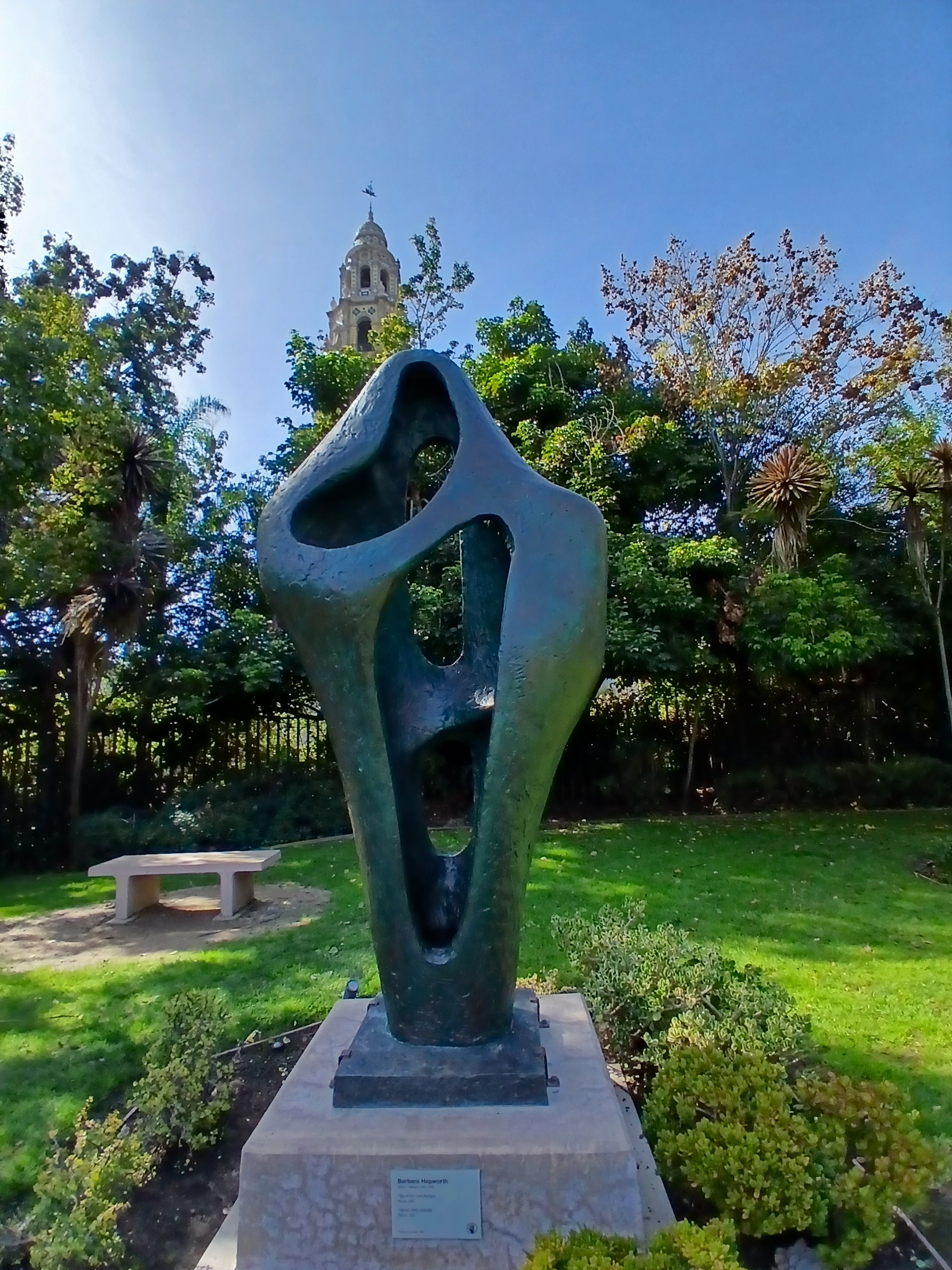
Figure for Landscape is a bronze sculpture by Barbara Hepworth, modeled in 1960. The San Diego Museum of Art purchase. 1968

== See also ==
- List of public art in Washington, D.C., Ward 2
