= Mother and Daughter Seated =

1971 bronze sculpture by Francisco Zúñiga

- The sculpture in 2016
- Artist: Francisco Zúñiga
- Year: 1971
- Type: Sculpture
- Medium: Bronze
- Location: San Diego, California, U.S.; 32°43′55.3″N 117°9′2.5″W

Mother and Daughter Seated (also known as Mother and Daughter, seated and Madre e Hija Sentadas) is a 1971 outdoor bronze sculpture by Francisco Zúñiga, installed at Balboa Park in San Diego, in the U.S. state of California. It is part of the collection of the San Diego Museum of Art.

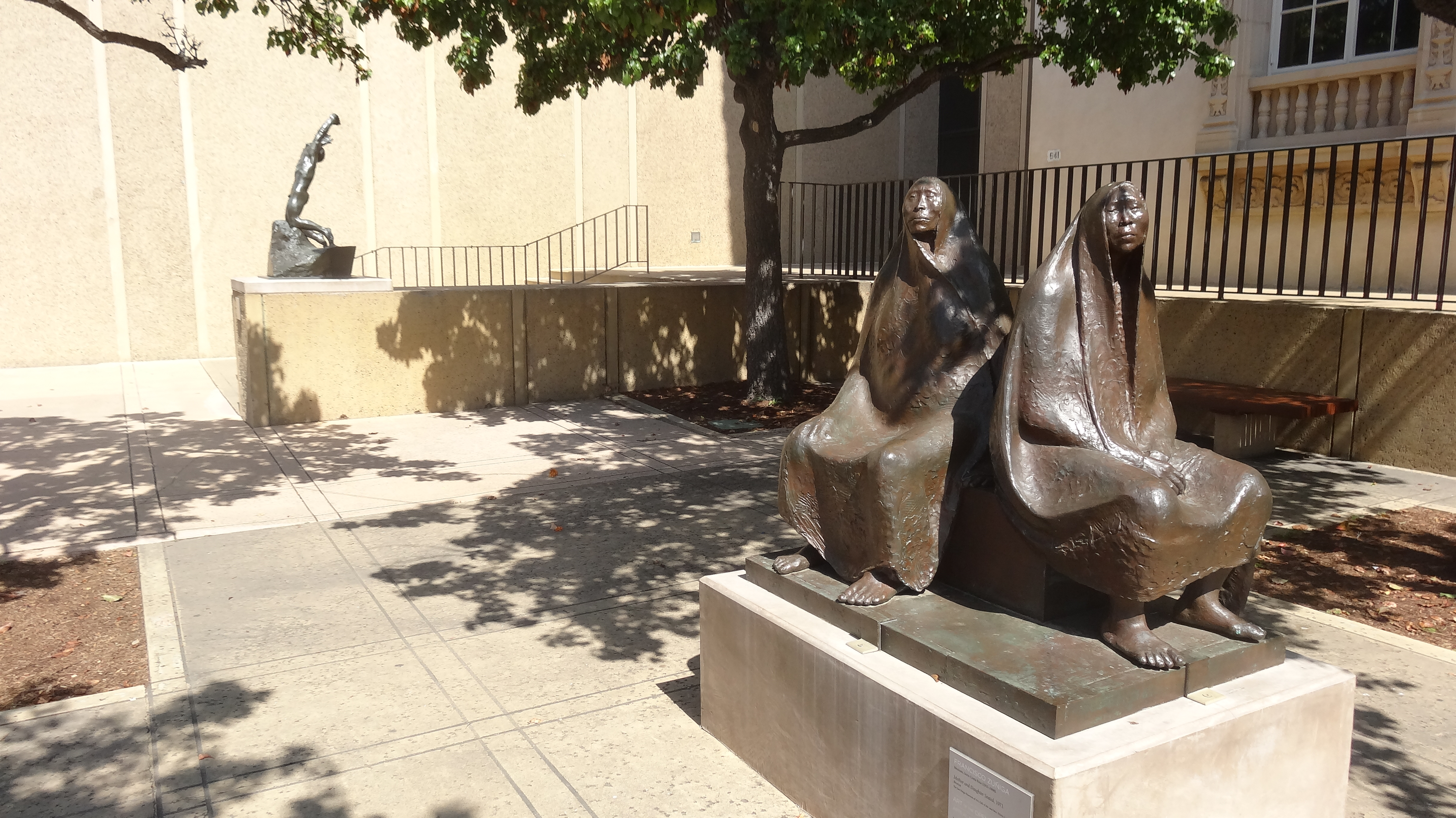
San Diego Museum of Art, Balboa Park

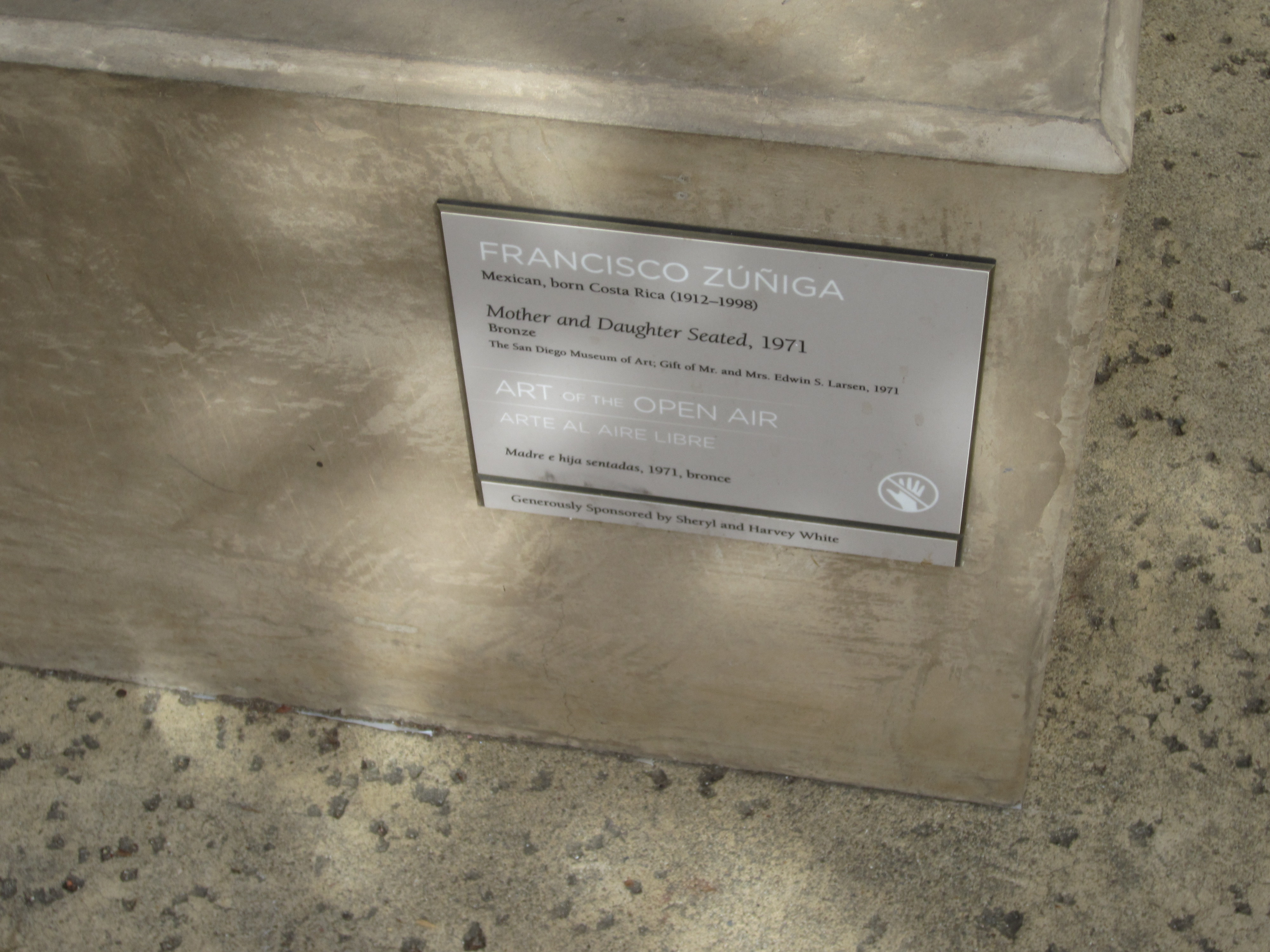

== See also ==
- 1971 in art
