= Francisco Zúñiga =

Costa Rican-born Mexican artist

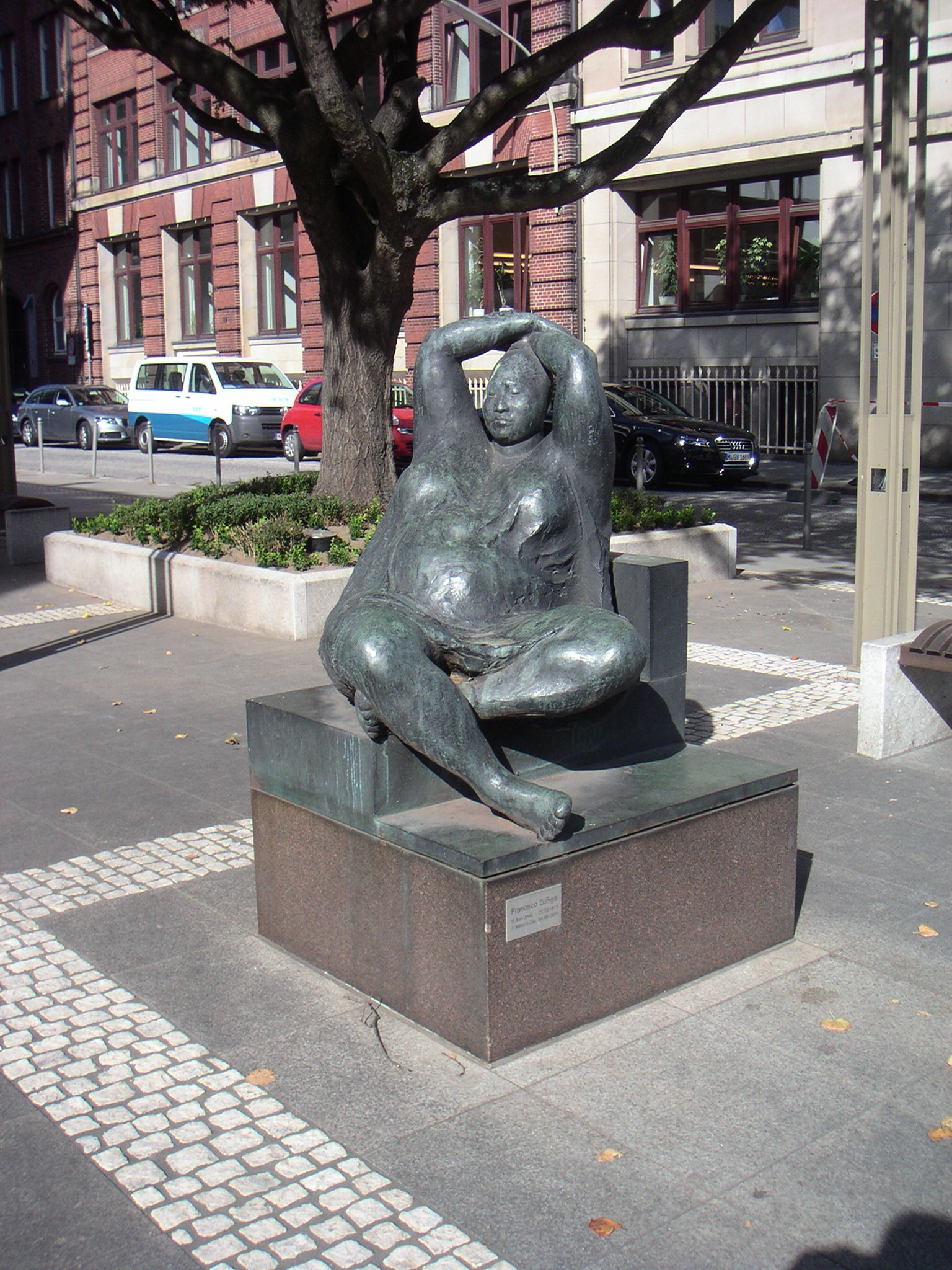

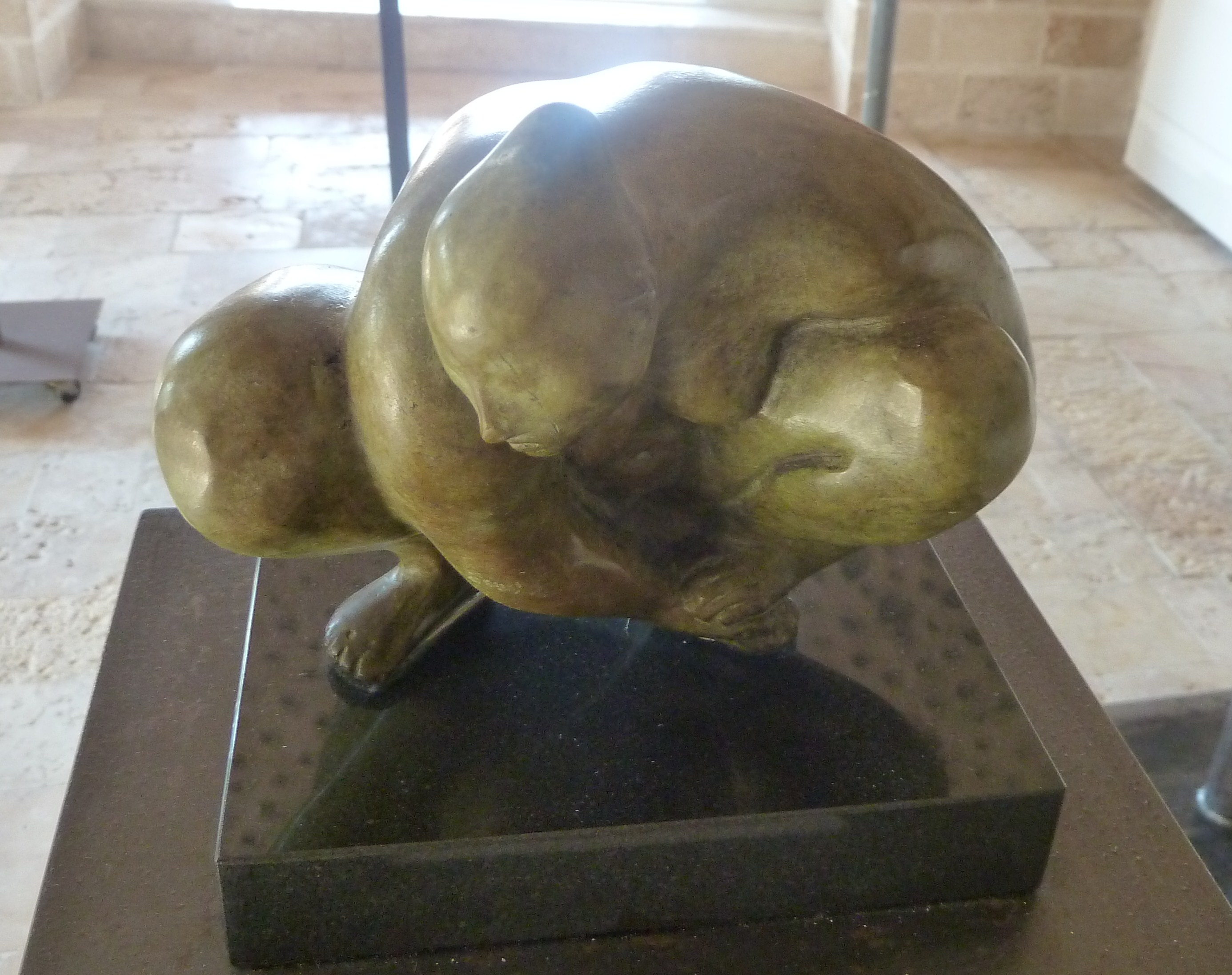
"Squatting Nude", at the Ilana Goor Museum.

A bronze sculpture by Francisco Zuniga, on the campus of the University of Southern California, Los Angeles, CA.

José Jesús Francisco Zúñiga Chavarría (December 27, 1912 – August 9, 1998) was a Costa Rican-born Mexican artist, known both for his painting and his sculpture. Journalist Fernando González Gortázar lists Zúñiga as one of the 100 most notable Mexicans of the 20th century, while the Encyclopædia Britannica calls him "perhaps the best sculptor" of the Mexican political modern style.

== Biography ==
Zúñiga was born in Guadalupe, Barrio de San José, Costa Rica on December 27, 1912, to Manuel Maria Zúñiga and María Chavarría, both sculptors. His father worked as a sculptor of religious figures, and in stone work. His artistic inclinations began early and by the age of twelve had already read books on the history of art, artistic anatomy and the life of various Renaissance painters. At age fifteen he began working in his father's shop. This experience sensitized him to shape and spaces. In 1926 he enrolled in the Escuela de Bellas Artes in Mexico, but left the following year to continue on his own. As part of his self-study, he studied German Expressionism and the writings of Alexander Heilmayer, through which he learned of the work of two French sculptors, Aristide Maillol and Auguste Rodin, coming to appreciate the idea of subordinating technique to expression.

Zúñiga's painting and sculpting work began receiving recognition in 1929. His first stone sculpture won second prize at the Exposición Nacional de Bellas Artes. In the following two years continued to win top prizes at this event. This work made critics recommend him for study abroad. He won first prize in a 1935 Latin American sculpture competition, the Salón de Escultura en Costa Rica, for his stone sculpture La maternidad, but the work caused controversy and the government rescinded its award. In the 1930s, he began to research pre Hispanic art and its importance to contemporary Latin American art, as well as what was happening artistically in Mexico. The scholarship never materialized so various colleagues organized his first individual exhibition in Costa Rica. The earnings from this endeavor earned his passage to Mexico City. In 1936 he immigrated to Mexico permanently.

In the early 1930s, he joined a wave of young artists with nationalist sensibilities in modern art and design. Together with number of other national artists including Teodorico Quirós and Fausto Pacheco, he helped create the so-called New Sensibility movement in Costa Rican art.

In the capital, his first contact with Manuel Rodríguez Lozano, who opened his library to Zúñiga. He did some formal study at La Escuela de Talla Directa, working with Guillermo Ruiz, sculptor Oliverio Martínez, and painter Rodríguez Lozano. In 1937 he worked as an assistant to Oliverio Martínez on the Monument to the Revolution, the re-imagined building that had begun as the Federal Legislative Palace conceived during the regime of Porfirio Díaz. In 1938, he took a faculty position at La Esmeralda; he remained at that position until retiring in 1970. In 1958 he was awarded the first prize in sculpture from the Mexican National Institute of Fine Arts.

In the 1940s, the New York Museum of Modern Art acquired the sculpture Cabeza de niño totonaca and the Metropolitan Museum of Art requested two of his drawings. He also helped to found the Sociedad Mexicana de Escultores and received commissions in various parts of Mexico.

In 1947, he married Elena Laborde, a painting student. They had three children, Ariel, Javier and Marcela.

In 1949, he was part of the founding board of the Salón de la Plástica Mexicana, and in 1951, he joined the Frente Nacional de Artes Plástica of Francisco Goitia .

Major individual exhibitions during his career include the Bernard Lewin Gallery in Los Angeles in 1965, a retrospective at the Museo de Arte Moderno in 1969 and various exhibitions in Europe in the 1980s.

In 1971, he received the Acquisition Prize at the 1971 Biennial of Open Air Sculpture of Middelheim in Antwerp, Belgium. In 1975 twenty of his drawings with the Misrachi Gallery obtained the silver medal at the International Book Exposition of Leipzig. In the 1980s, he was named an Academic of the Accademia delle Arte e del Lavoro in Parma, Italy. In Mexico he won the Elías Sourasky Prize.

In 1984 he won the first Kataro Takamura Prize of the Third Biennial of Sculpture in Japan.

He became a Mexican citizen in 1986, fifty years after his arrival in the country.

In 1992 he received the Premio Nacional de Arte, and in 1994, the Palacio de Bellas Artes held a tribute to his career.

Near the end of his life, illness left him nearly blind, which caused him to shift his artistic work to terra cotta, using his hands to create the lines.

== Works ==
Zúñiga created over thirty five public sculptures, such as the monument to poet Ramón López Velarde in the city of Zacatecas and others dedicated to Mexican heroes. In the 1940s he created two sculpture for Chapultepec Park, Muchachas corriendo and Física nuclear. In 1984 he created a group of sculptures called Tres generaciones for the city of Sendai, Japan. During his lifetime, these were considered his most important works. Since then, they have become secondary to his other sculpting.

He stated that he preferred figurative art because he found the human figure to be “the most important aspect of the world around (him)”. He was also strongly influenced by pre Hispanic art, spending significant time sketching pieces in museums, along with images of women in traditional markets, feeling that they represented maternity and familial responsibility.

Museums holding his works in their permanent collections include the San Diego Museum of Art, the New Mexico Museum of Art, the Metropolitan Museum of Art and the Museum of Modern Art in New York, the Museo de Arte Moderno in Mexico City, the Dallas Museum of Art, the Phoenix Art Museum, the Ponce Museum of Art in Puerto Rico, and the Hirshhorn Museum and Sculpture Garden in Washington, D.C.

- Seated Yucatan Woman
- Mother and Daughter Seated (1971), San Diego

== Books ==
- Anguiano, Raúl; Moyssén Echeverría, Xavier; Sebastián, Enrique Carbajal (1998), Homenaje al maestro Francisco Zúñiga : (1912 - 1998), Academia de Artes, ISBN 968-7292-12-1.
- Brewster, Jerry (1984), Zúñiga, Alpine Fine Arts, ISBN 0-88168-007-9.
- Echeverria, Carlos Francisco (1981), Zúñiga: An Album of His Sculptures, Hacker Art Books, ISBN 978-968-7047-03-4.
- Cardona Pena, Alfredo (1997), Francisco Zúñiga: Viaje poetico, Editorial Universidad Estatal a Distancia, ISBN 978-9977-64-899-6.
- Ferrero, Luis (1985), Zúñiga, Costa Rica: Colección Daniel Yankelewitz, Editorial Costa Rica, ISBN 9977-23-160-5.
- Paquet, Marcel (1989), Zúñiga: La abstracción sensible, El Taller del Equilibrista, ISBN 968-6285-24-5.
- Reich, Sheldon (1981), Francisco Zúñiga, Sculptor: Conversations and Interpretations, Univ. of Arizona Press, ISBN 978-0-8165-0665-1.
- Rodriguez Prampolini, Ida (2002), La obra de Francisco Zúñiga, canon de belleza americana, Sinc, S.A. de C.V / Albedrio, ISBN 978-970-9027-07-5.
- Zúñiga, Ariel (2001), Francisco Zúñiga: Travel sketches 1, Sinc, S.A. de C.V / Albedrio, ISBN 978-970-9027-05-1.
- Zúñiga, Ariel (1999), Francisco Zúñiga, Catalogo Razonado, Volumen I: Escultura / Catalogue Raisonné, Volume I: Sculpture (1923-1993), Sinc, S.A. de C.V / Albedrio, ISBN 978-970-9027-02-0.
- Zúñiga, Ariel (2003), Francisco Zúñiga, Catalogo Razonado, Vol. II: Oleos, estampas y reproducciones / Catalogue Raisonné, Vol. II: Oil Paintings, prints and reproductions, Sinc, S.A. de C.V / Albedrio, ISBN 978-970-9027-08-2.
- Zúñiga, Ariel (2007), Francisco Zúñiga Catalogo Razonado / Catalogue Raisonné Volume III (Drawings 1927–1970), Sinc, S.A. de C.V / Albedrio, ISBN 978-970-9027-10-5.
- Zúñiga, Ariel (2007), Francisco Zúñiga Catalogo Razonado / Catalogue Raisonné Volume IV (Drawings 1971–1989), Sinc, S.A. de C.V / Albedrio, ISBN 978-970-9027-11-2.

== Additional sources ==
- Nieto Sua, Rosa Amparo (1983), Francisco Zúñiga and the Mexican tradition, M.A. thesis, Queens College, New York.
- Ruiz de Icaza, Maru (1998), "Francisco Zúñiga: sus mujeres indígenas se asentaron en el ex Palacio del Arzobispo", Actual, 5 (52): 68.
- Sánchez Ambriz, Mary Carmen (1998), "Francisco Zúñiga, 1912-1998; In memoriam", Siempre!, 45 (2357): 61.
- Ureña Rib, Fernando (2007), La sostenida maestría de Francisco Zúñiga.
- Van Rheenen, Erin (2007), Living Abroad in Costa Rica, Avalon Travel Publishing, ISBN 978-1-56691-652-3.
