= Odyssey III =

Sculpture by Tony Rosenthal in San Diego, California, U.S.

Odyssey III, 1973
- The sculpture photographed in 2016
- Artist: Tony Rosenthal
- Year: 1973
- Type: Sculpture
- Medium: Painted aluminum
- Location: San Diego Museum of Art; San Diego, California, United States; 32.73199°N 117.15022°W

Odyssey III is an abstract 1973 painted aluminum sculpture by Tony Rosenthal, located in San Diego, California. It is installed outside the San Diego Museum of Art in Balboa Park.

The Rosenthal sculpture was purchased by the San Diego Museum of Art in 1974 with matching funds from the National Endowment for the Arts. Since 2016, it has been included in "Art of the Open Air", an exhibition open to the public without admission charge of public art owned by the San Diego Museum of Art.

The San Diego Union-Tribune described the work as a "riotous orangey-red-painted assembly of aluminum discs".

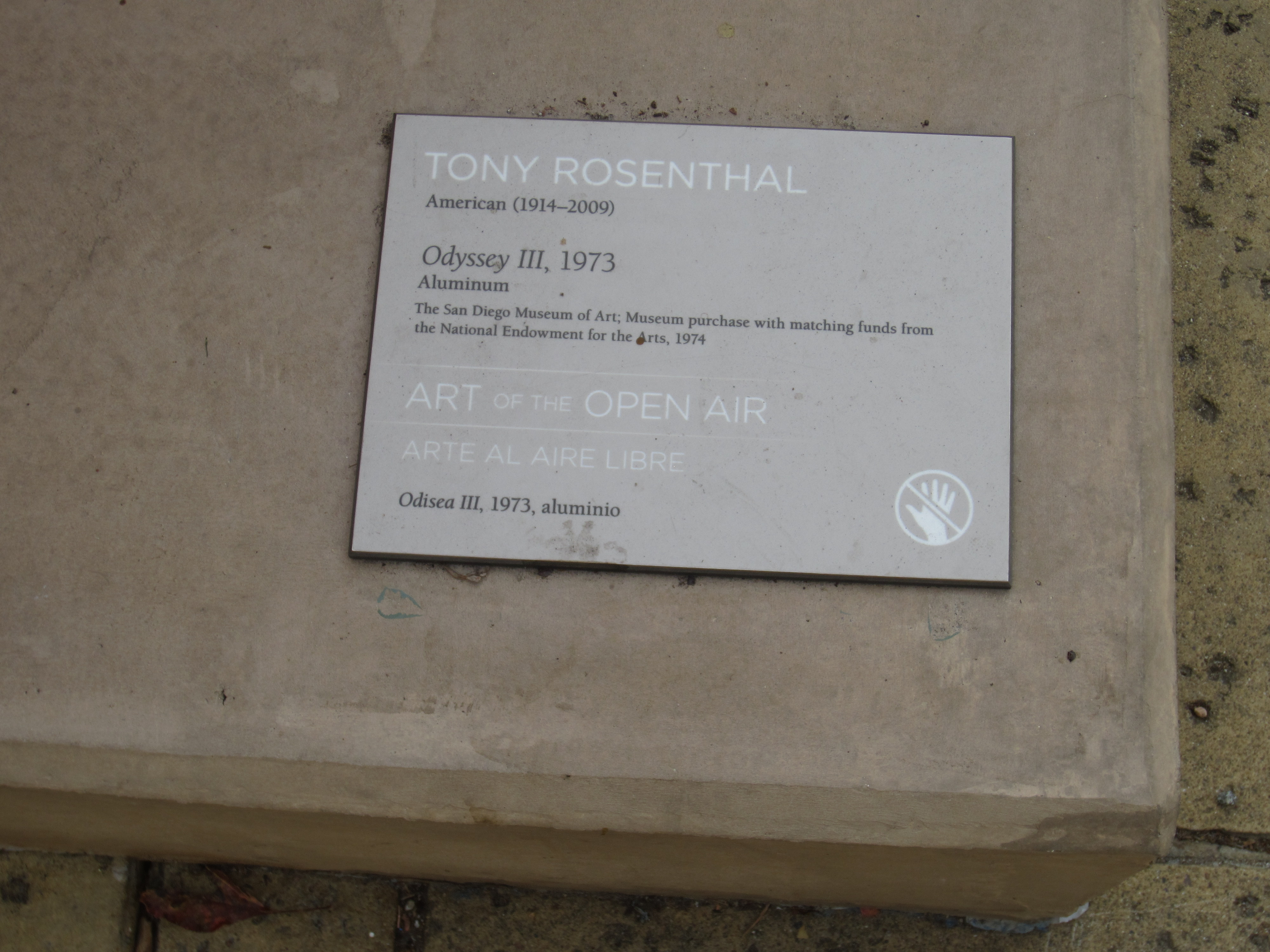

== See also ==
- 1973 in art
