= Big Open Skull =

Sculpture in San Diego, California, U.S.

- The sculpture in 2016
- Artist: Jack Zajac
- Year: 1966–1973
- Type: Sculpture
- Medium: Bronze
- Location: San Diego Museum of Art, San Diego, California, United States; 32.73203°N 117.15007°W

Big Open Skull is an outdoor 1966–1973 bronze sculpture by Jack Zajac, installed outside the San Diego Museum of Art in San Diego's Balboa Park, in the U.S. state of California.

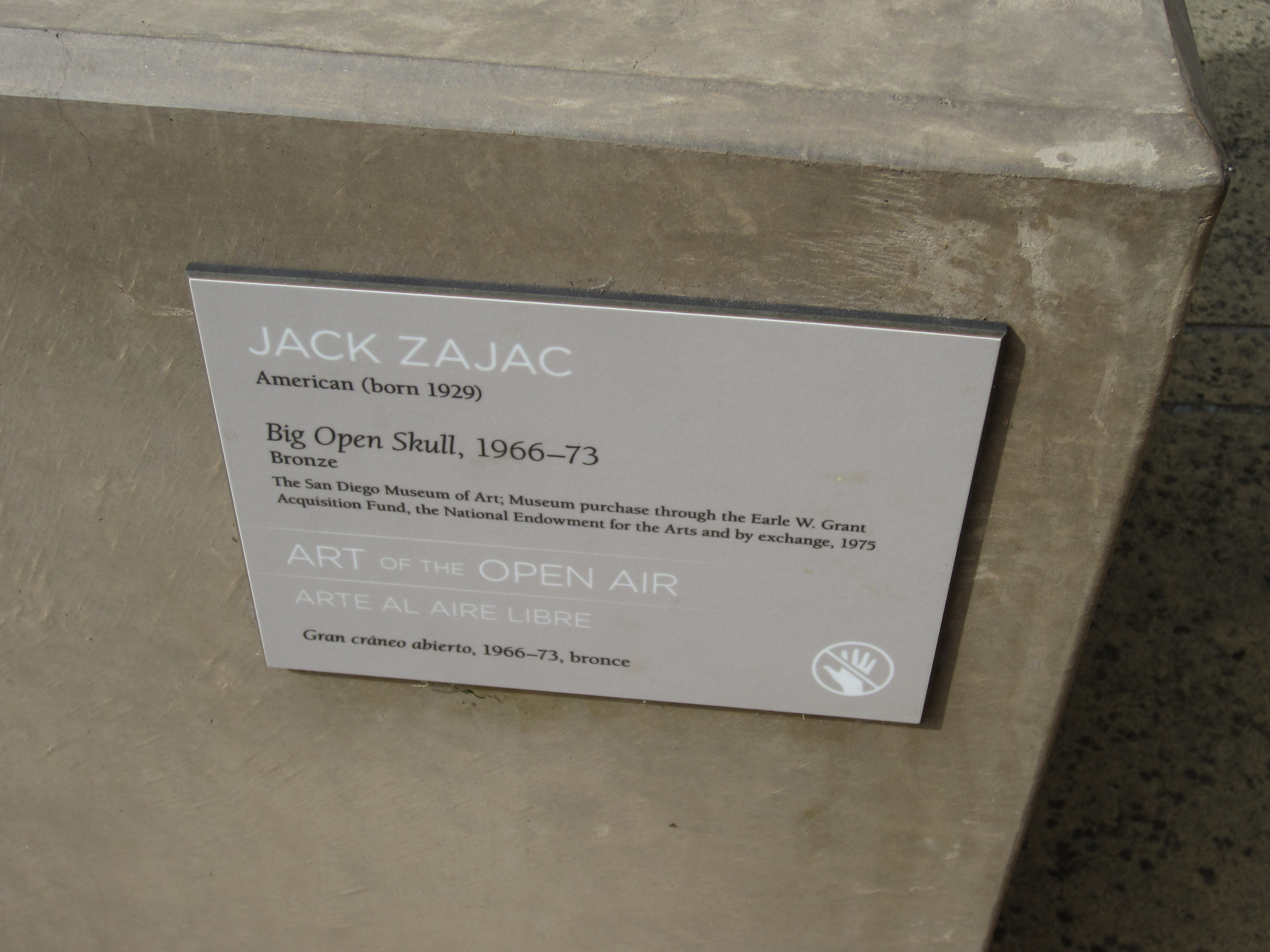
Big Open Skull by Jack Zajac, San Diego, 2016

== See also ==
- 1973 in art
