= The Prodigal Son (sculpture) =

Sculpture by Auguste Rodin

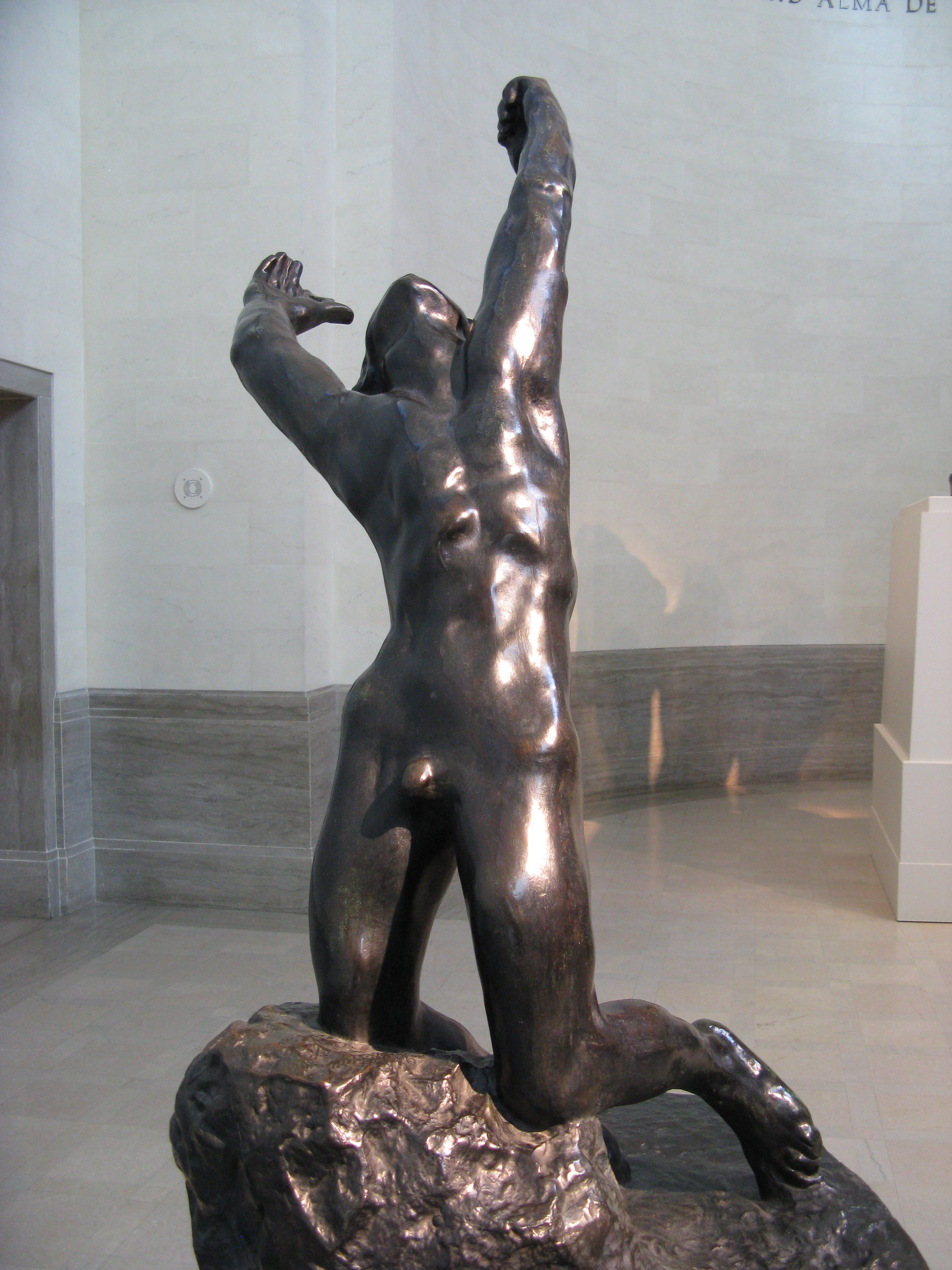
- A version at Legion of Honor, San Francisco, in 2012
- Artist: Auguste Rodin

The Prodigal Son is a sculpture by Auguste Rodin.

== Versions ==
Versions exist in several museums, including:

- Victoria and Albert Museum, London: c. 1885–1887, bronze
- Musée Rodin, Paris: 1905, bronze
- Ny Carlsberg Glyptoteket, Copenhagen: modelled 1884, carved 1899, limestone
- Allen Memorial Art Museum, Oberlin, Ohio: c. 1905, bronze
- The San Diego Museum of Art, Balboa Park, California: 1905, bronze
- Los Angeles County Museum of Art, California: 1967, bronze

== See also ==
- List of sculptures by Auguste Rodin
