= Solar Bird =

Sculpture by Joan Miró

- The sculpture in 2016
- Artist: Joan Miró
- Year: 1966
- Type: Sculpture
- Location: Art Institute of Chicago; Fundació Joan Miró; Museum of Modern Art; San Diego Museum of Art

Solar Bird is a 1966 sculpture by Spanish artist Joan Miró. Several institutions have copies in their collections, including:

- Art Institute of Chicago (1966, bronze, 48 x 71 x 40 in.)
- Museum of Modern Art (1966, bronze, 47 1/4 x 70 7/8 x 40 1/8")
- The San Diego Museum of Art (1966–1967, bronze), Balboa Park
- Fundació Joan Miró, Barcelona (Carrara marble, 163 x 146 x 240 cm, 1968)
- Fondation Maeght, Saint-Paul-de-Vence (Carrara marble, 1968)
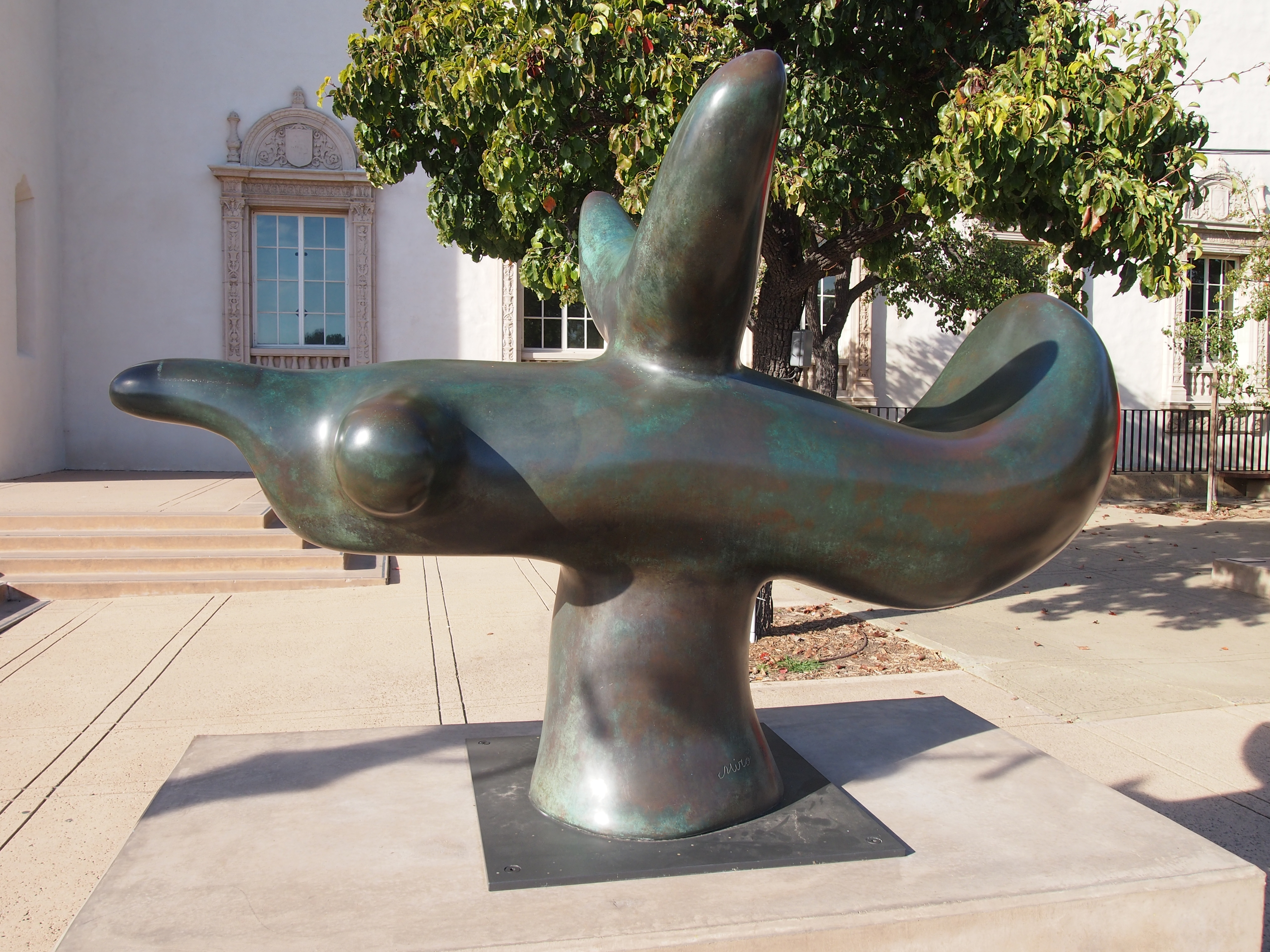

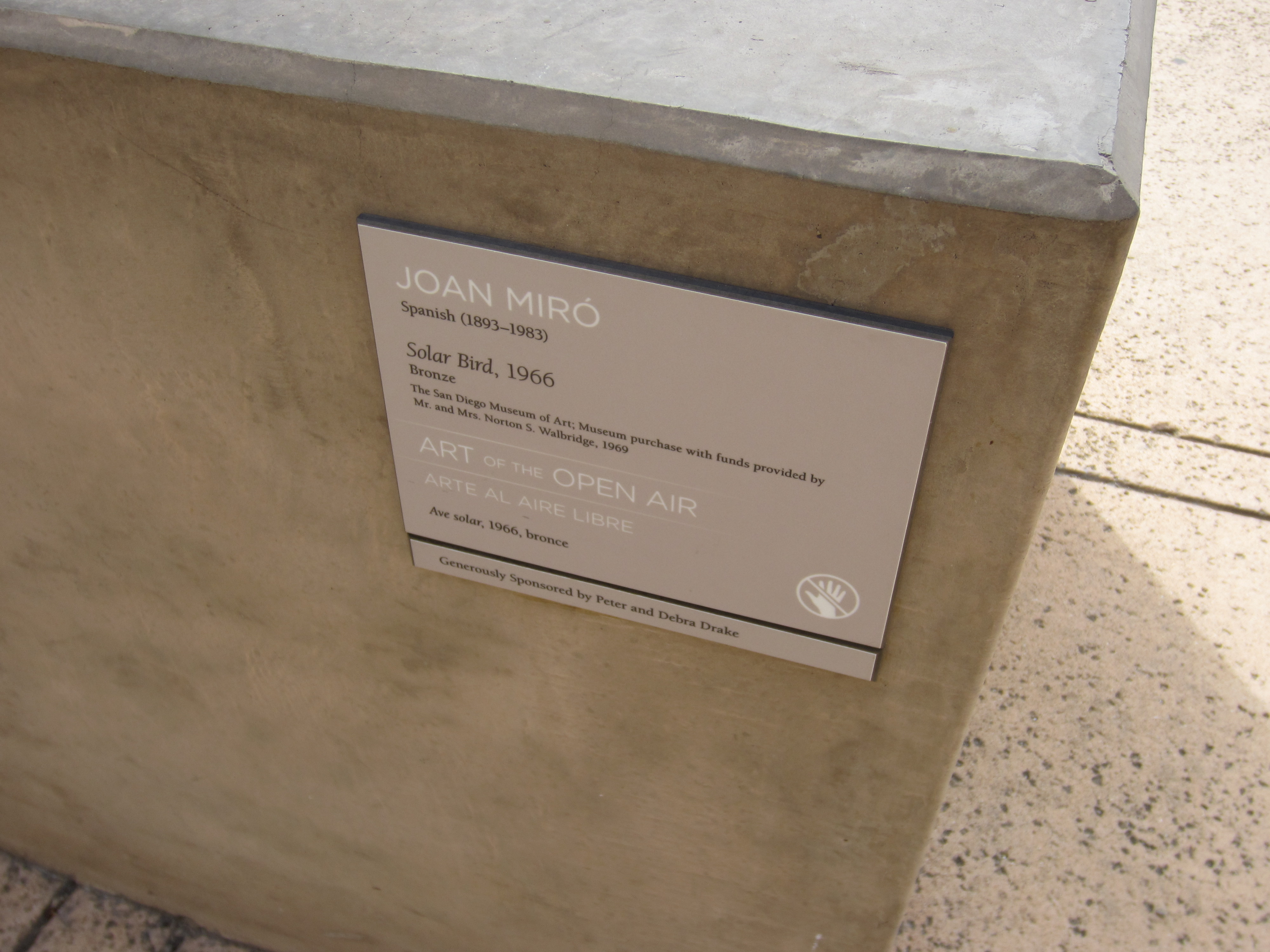

== See also ==
- 1966 in art
