= Luginbuhl =

Luginbuhl can refer to:

- Bernhard Luginbühl (1929–2011), Swiss architect
- 7393 Luginbuhl, minor planet named after American astronomer Christian B. Luginbuhl
