= Museum Tinguely =

Art museum in Basel, Switzerland

Coordinates: 47°33′33″N 7°36′44″E

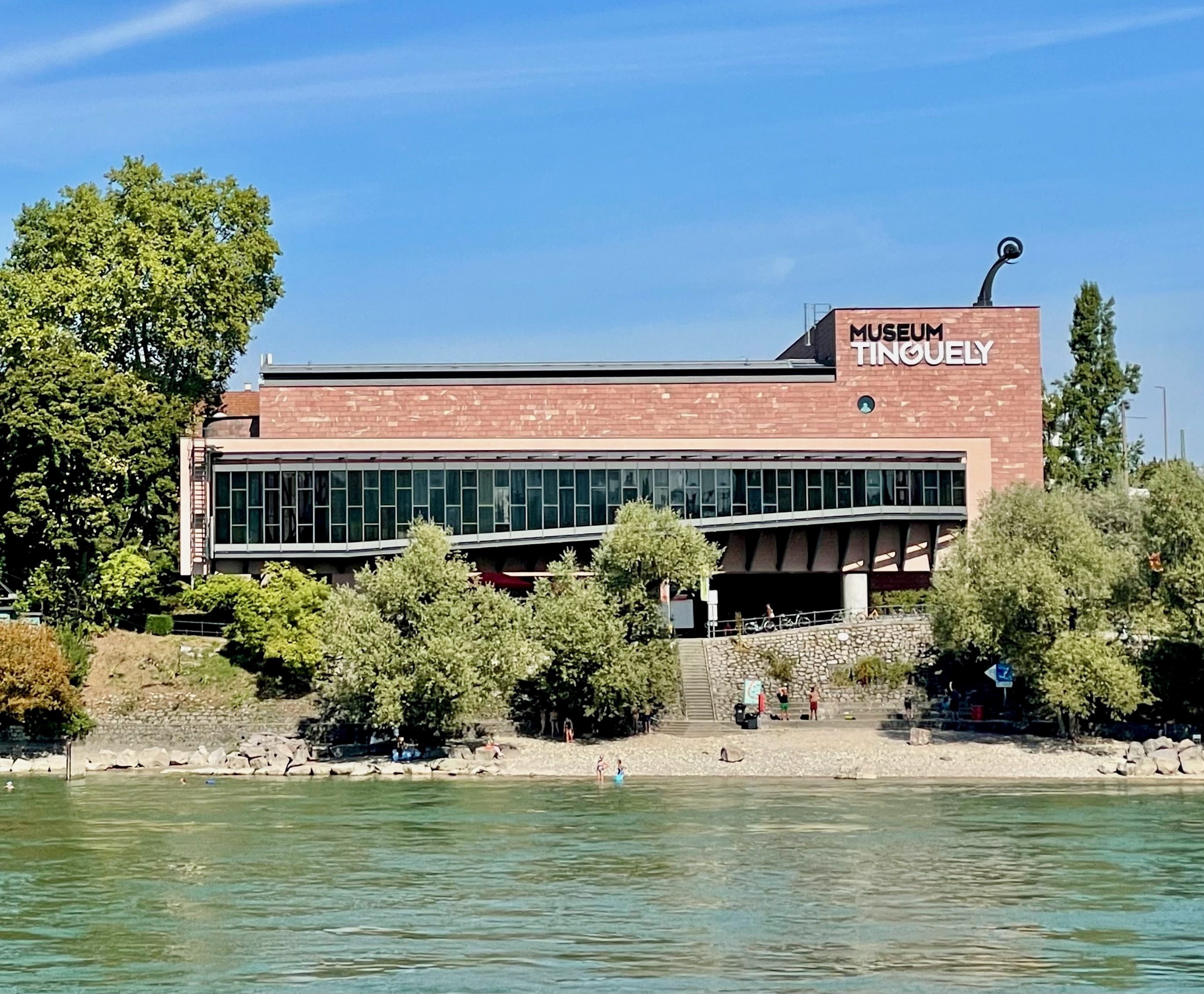
Museum Tinguely seen from across the Rhine, Basel

Museum Tinguely exterior

The Museum Tinguely is an art museum in Basel, Switzerland, devoted to the work of Swiss painter and sculptor Jean Tinguely (1925–1991). The building was designed by architect Mario Botta and opened in 1996 beside the Rhine. The museum has the world’s largest collection of Tinguely’s work, from early reliefs to large-scale kinetic sculptures.

== Collection ==
The museum’s permanent display includes Tinguely’s kinetic sculptures, as well as illustrations, photographs, and archive material about his life and work. Soon after the museum opened, Niki de Saint Phalle donated more than 50 works from Tinguely’s estate.

== Exhibitions ==
The museum also holds temporary exhibitions on other artists, including people who worked at the same time as Tinguely and contemporary artists.

In 2023, the Museum Tinguely open an exhibition called La roue = c’est tout, about Tinguely’s work in kinetic art. Near the entrance is Éloge de la folie (1966), a large-scale relief first made as a stage set for a ballet in Paris. The piece had been in private collection for about 20 years before being acquired by the museum. The exhibition also shows early Méta-Mécaniques, machines made from scrap in the 1960s, large Méta-Harmonies, and material about Tinguely’s work with other artists.

Also in 2023, the museum showed The Last Reality Show, an installation by playwright Boris Nikitin. The work included a replica of the living container used in the first season of the reality television show Big Brother. The installation was first made in 2020 for a theatre production in Germany, and was shown as a walk-through work. The museum linked it to Tinguely's interest in people and machines.

== Gallery ==
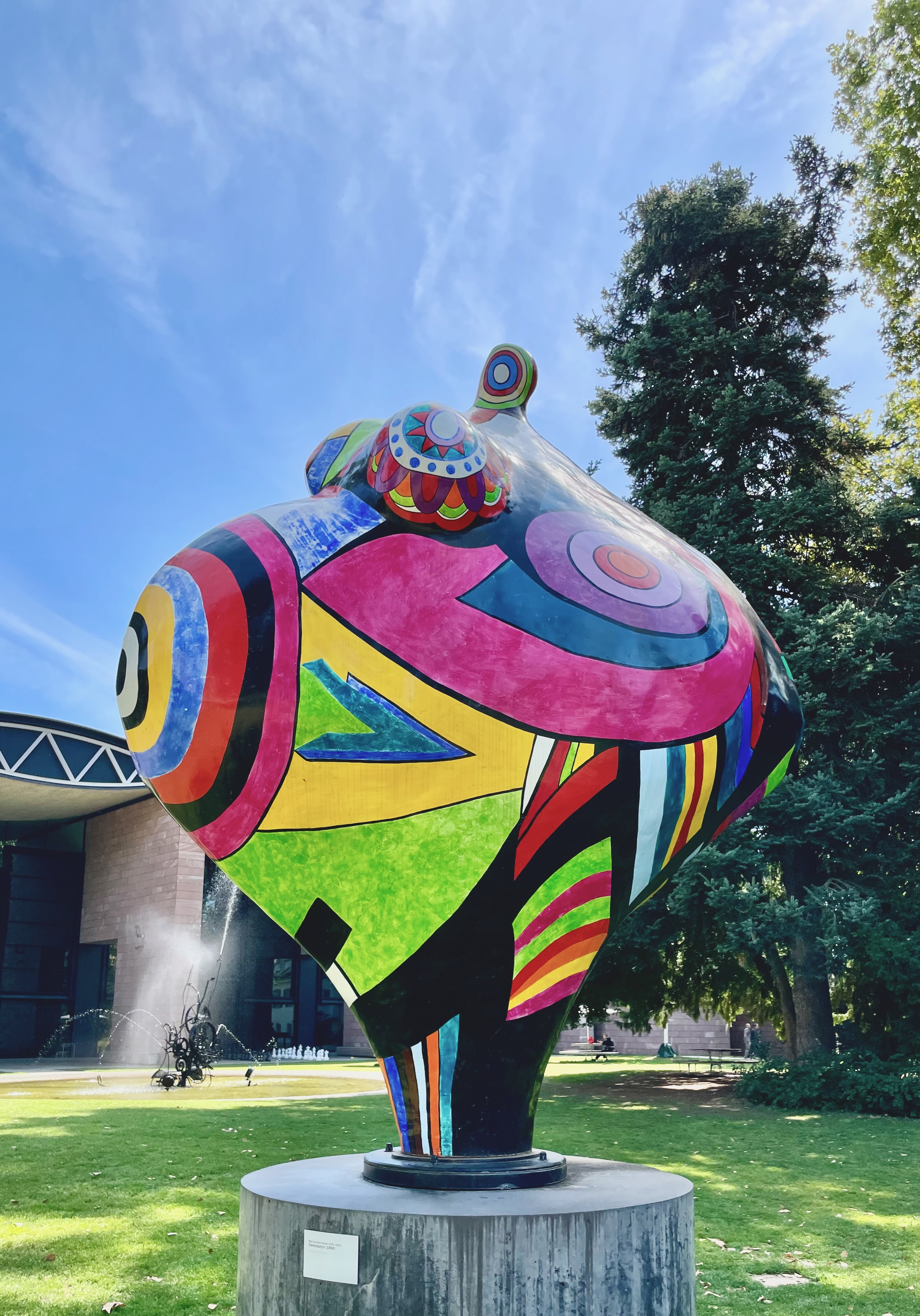
Gwendolyn (1966) by Niki de Saint Phalle, in Solitude Park

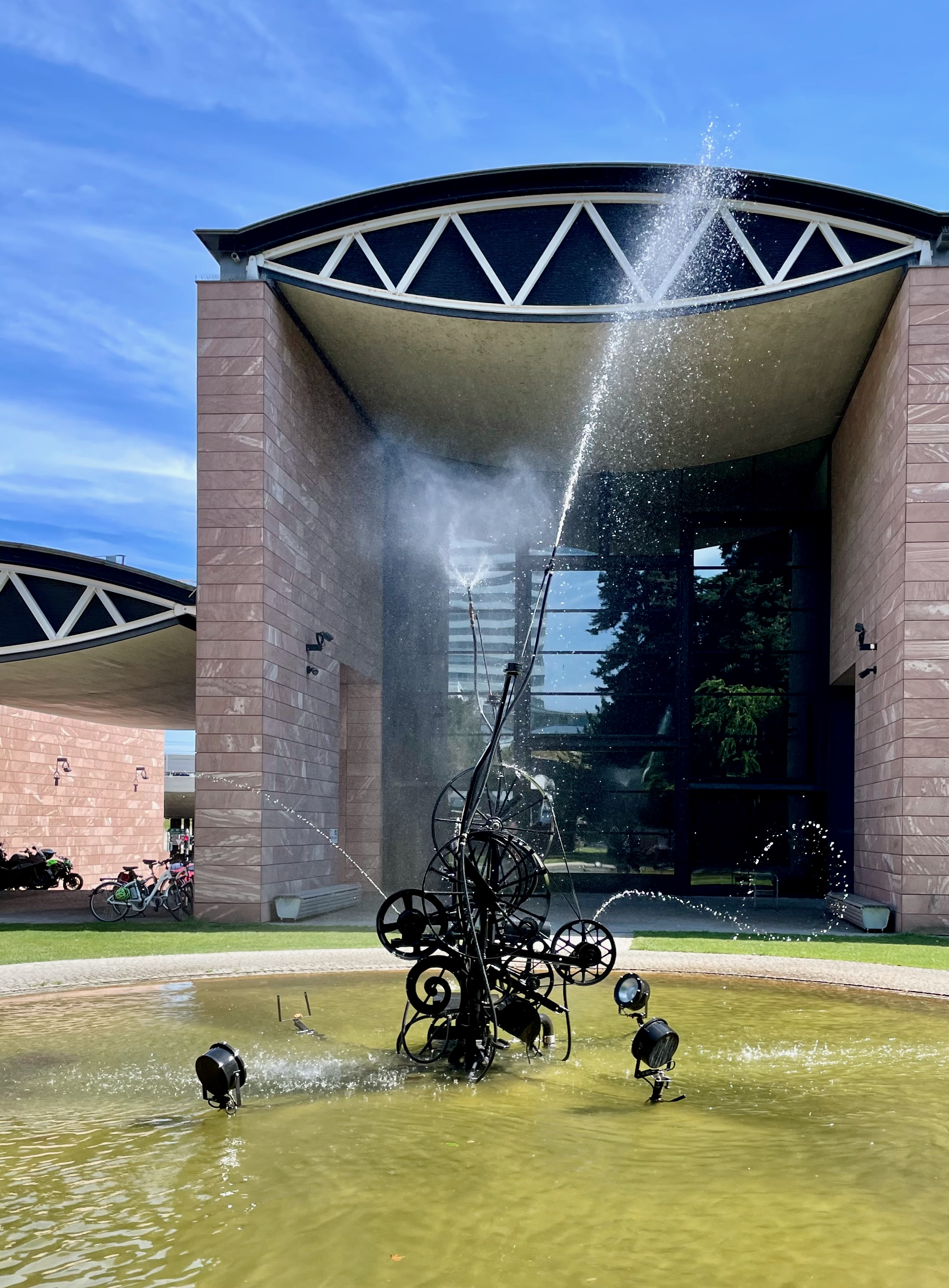
Schwimmwasser-Plastik (1980) by Jean Tinguely, in Solitude Park

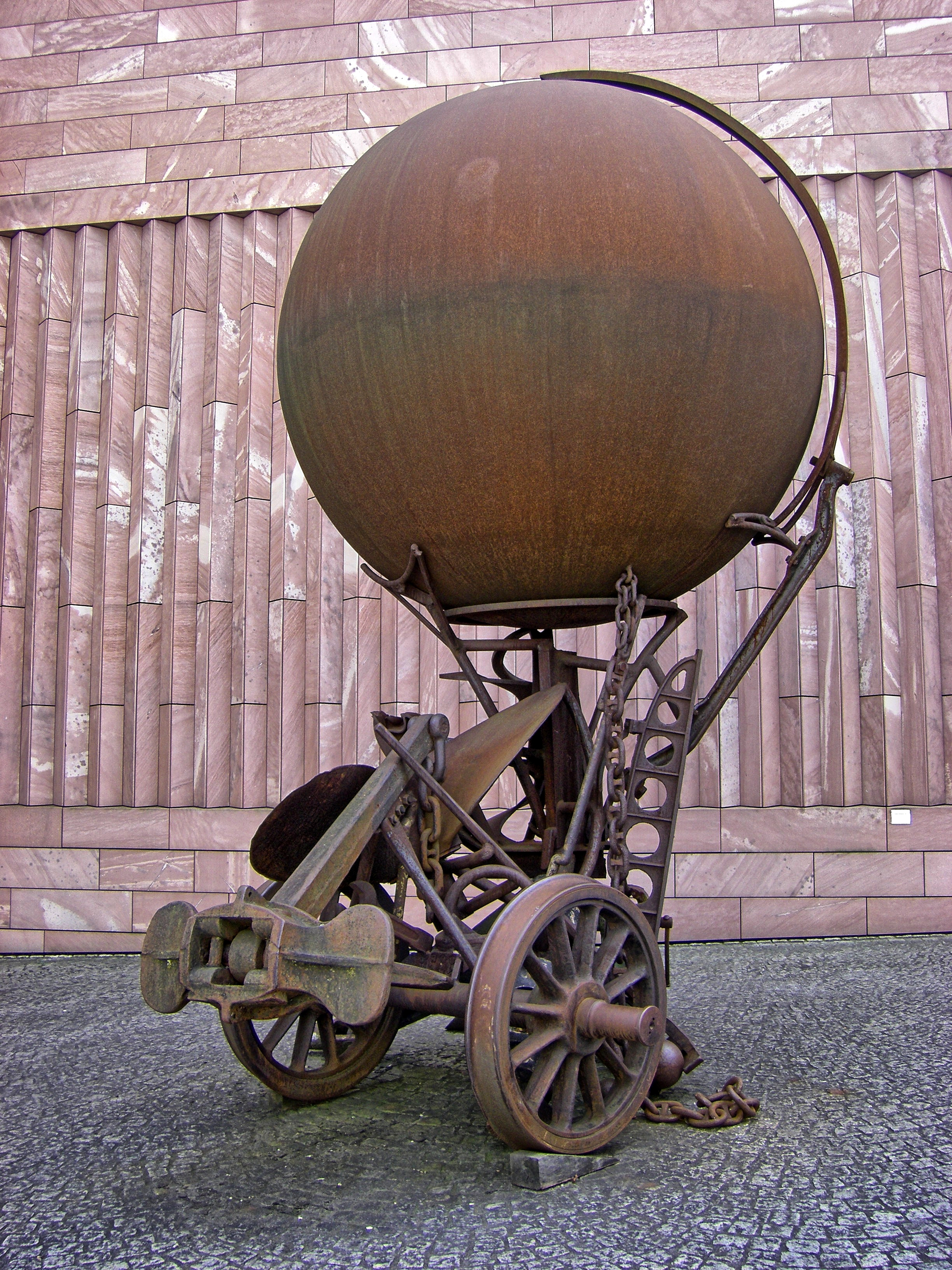
Dickfigur Beteigeuze (1996) by Bernhard Luginbühl, outside Museum Tinguely

== See also ==
- Chaos I
- List of museums in Switzerland
- List of single-artist museums
- Museums in Basel
- Stravinsky Fountain
