= Homage to New York =

1960 kinetic art performance by Tinguely

- Artist: Jean Tinguely
- Year: 1960

Homage to New York was a 1960 kinetic artwork and performance by Jean Tinguely.

== Description ==
Homage to New York was a kinetic artwork composed of found mechanical parts including multiple bicycle wheels, a weather balloon, a piano, a radio, an American flag, a bassinet, and a toilet, all painted white. In its first and only performance in the New York Museum of Modern Art sculpture garden on March 17, 1960, the machine whirred to life with the sounds and smells of its mechanical motion. The sculpture was split into sections that would activate at different times, slowly turning the overall sculpture until, in its climax, the machine would destroy itself. In one section, the piano played while glass bottles dropped from above, shattering and releasing noxious odors. A youth go-kart scurried in front of the sculpture.

== Production ==
In February 1960, Museum of Modern Art curator for painting and sculpture Peter Selz commissioned artist Jean Tinguely to make a self-destructing machine to perform in the museum's sculpture garden. Tinguely found its components among scraps, junk, garbage dumps, and shops in New Jersey and New York City.

Tinguely intended for the work to reflect the excess and overabundance of modern living. Christina Chau described it as a "spectacle of abundance, from abundance" that produced nothing besides "motion".

== Bibliography ==
- Chau, Christina (2017). Movement, Time, Technology, and Art. Springer. ISBN 978-981-10-4705-3.
