= Milena Palakarkina =

French painter

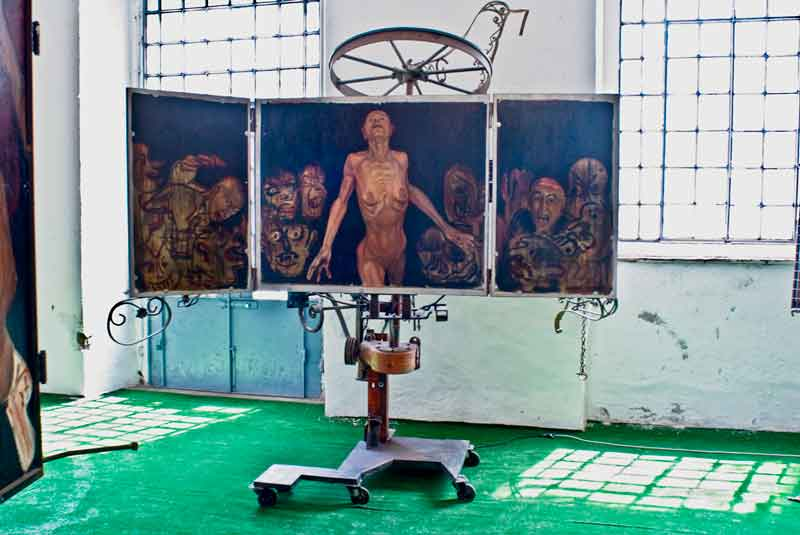
Milena Palakarkina, Bride of Christ, mixed media, 1990

Milena Palakarkina (born 1959) is a Bulgarian artist. She collaborated with Jean Tinguely during the last five years of his life and together they created a three series of paintings called Märtyrer und Gespenster. The collection was exhibited at galleries in Zurich (1990), Düsseldorf (1991), Fribourg (1991), Paris (1996), and Milan (2008). The works are on display at the Rossini Foundation in Carate Brianza in Northern Italy.

== Early life ==
After she completed undergraduate studies at UCLA and NYU, Palakarkina met Pierre Restany in 1983 in Milan. Under his influence she studied Yves Klein and moved to Paris in 1984 in order to write a screenplay.

While researching the project she reunited with Niki de Saint-Phalle, whom she had met in Hollywood in 1978. Niki introduced her to Jean Tinguely in 1986 and the young woman abandoned the screenplay to follow Tinguely to Switzerland where she returned to painting.

Palakarkina shared the last five years of Jean Tinguely's life and created with him a series of paintings Märtyrer und Gespenster, which includes three collaborations - The Altars: Saint Sebastian (1988), Saint Christopher/Rococo (1989), and Kathryn, Bride of Christ (1990). The collection was shown at the gallery Jamile Weber in Zurich in 1990 and at the Gallery Hans Mayer in Düsseldorf in 1991. The Altar Saint Sebastian was shown in the retrospective of Jean Tinguely in Musee d'Art et d'Histoire in Fribourg in 1991. The collaborations were shown at the Gallery Beaubourg in 1996 and at Padiglione d'Arte Contemporanea in Milan in 2008. The works are on display at the Rossini Foundation in Carate Brianza in Northern Italy.

Five months after Tinguely's death she gave birth to their son and returned to Paris to participate in the contemporary figurative art scene.
