= Métamatic =

Series of generative artwork by Jean Tinguely

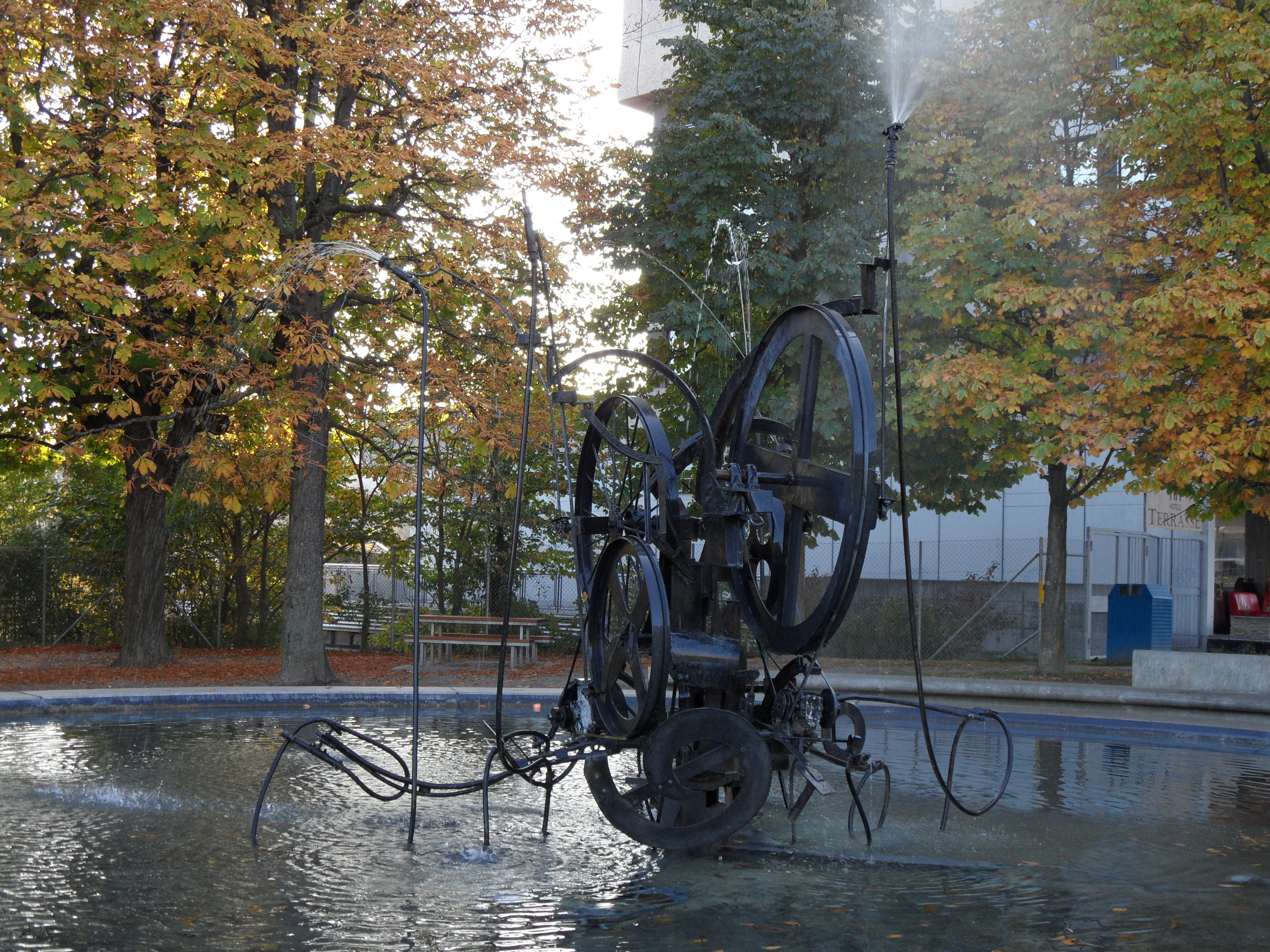
Fontaine Jean Tinguely (Fribourg)

In the mid-1950s Jean Tinguely began production of a series of generative works titled Métamatics: machines that produced art works. With this series of works, Tinguely not only problematised the introduction of the robotic machine as interface in our society, but also questioned the role of the artist, the art work and the viewer. Metamechanics (French méta-mécanique), in relation to art history, describes the kinetic sculpture machines of Jean Tinguely. It is also applied to, and may have its origins in, earlier work of the Dada art movement.

Jean Tinguely created his Métamatic sculptures between 1955 and 1959. These sculptures are modelled in a way that resembles the aesthetics of the Industrial Revolution. The drawings they produce resemble, but also mimic mid-century gestural abstraction. The abstract drawings are produced by means of a motor-driven arm that holds drawing implements of the viewer’s choosing against a piece of paper. The result is a random composition of lines and dots in colours chosen by the user.

His most famous Métamatic, no 17, was created especially for the 1959 Paris Biennale. This piece, which was driven by a small engine, served as a prototype for Tinguely’s later large-scale, self-destructing pieces.

The Métamatics and their artistic output brought Tinguely a new level of fame and notoriety and helped launch his career outside Europe. Tinguely’s first major exhibition of these works took place in 1959 at Galerie Iris Clert in Paris, which included a competition for the best drawing made on a Métamatic, with a jury of well-known figures in avant-garde Parisian art circles at the time, including Hans Arp, Yves Klein and Pierre Restany. Four thousand Métamatic drawings were made and at least five to six thousand people attended the exhibition. Even producers of the kind of gestural abstraction imitated by the Métamatics, such as Hans Hartung, attended. The success of this exhibition led to Tinguely’s first exhibition in the United States in 1960 at the Staempfli Gallery in New York, in which he presented five Métamatic sculptures.

Tinguely's Métamatics were part of a wide range of artistic activities in the late 1950s and into the 1960s that questioned the role of the artist as genius, critiqued the excessive commercialisation of both art works and artists’ personalities as products, and in some cases offered an alternative to the existing art structure. Tinguely was working on ideas that were pertinent not only to himself but to a wider group of artists and writers and, as such, Tinguely's Métamatics were part of a broader post-war interest in redefining art.
