= Bernhard Luginbühl =

Swiss sculptor (1929–2011)

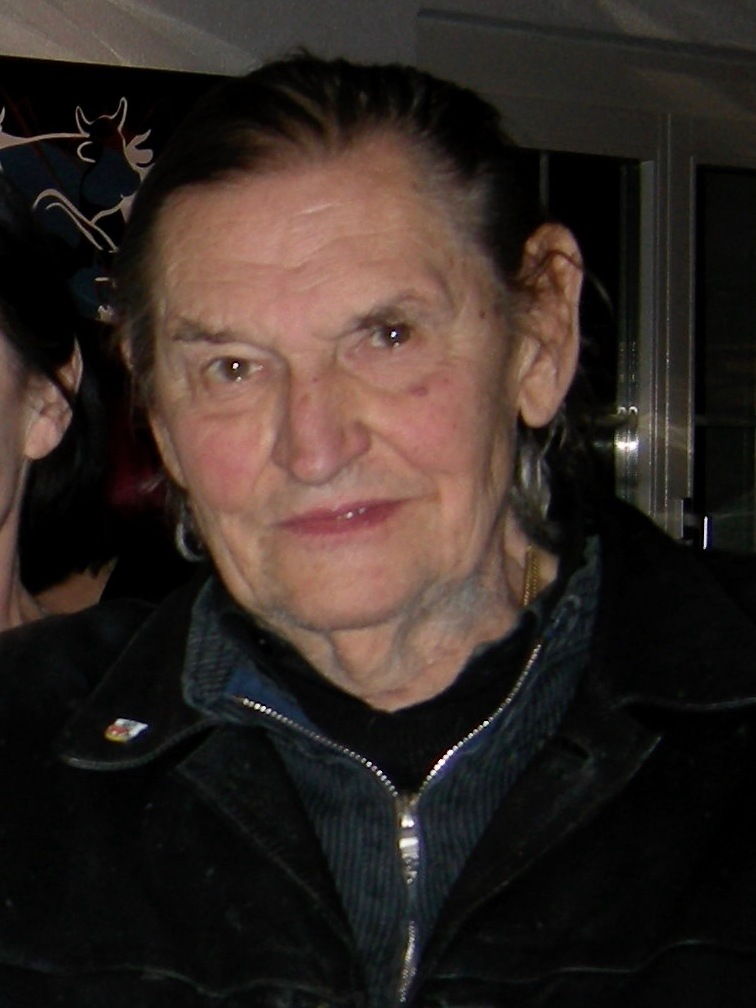
- Luginbühl in 2007
- Born: 16 February 1929; Bern, Switzerland
- Died: 19 February 2011 (aged 82); Langnau im Emmental, Bern, Switzerland
- Known for: Iron sculpture, performance art
- Spouse: Ursi Luginbühl-Koelner

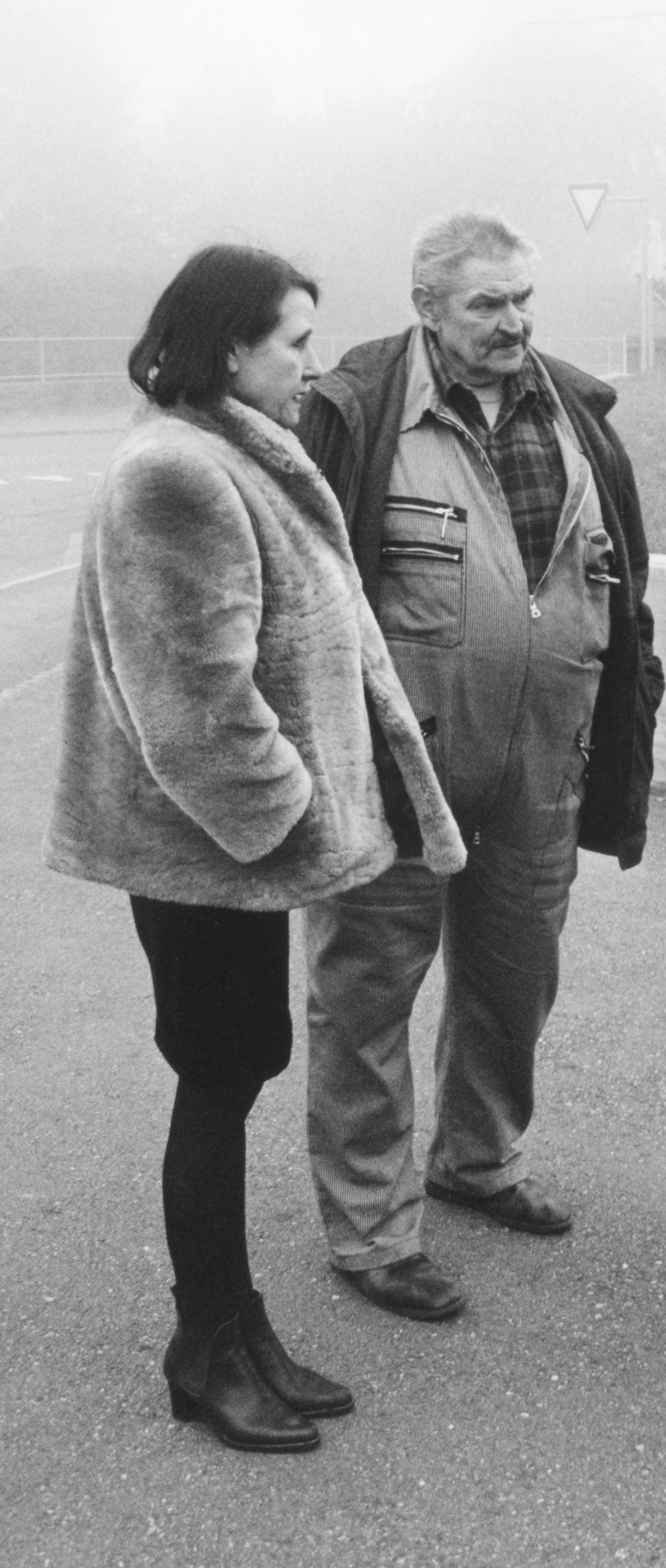
Bernhard and Ursi Luginbühl-Koelner in 1997

Bernhard Luginbühl (16 February 1929 – 19 February 2011) was a Swiss sculptor known for monumental iron sculptures. Many were assembled from industrial scrap and shaped like animals. He had a long-standing friendship with fellow Swiss artist Jean Tinguely. His work achieved international recognition, and he exhibited at the Venice Biennale in 1956 and 1964 and at documenta in 1964 and 1977.

== Biography ==
Bernhard Luginbühl was born on 16 February 1929 in Bern. The son of a butcher from Bern’s Lorraine district, he repeatedly returned to animal subjects throughout his career, with large animals especially prominent in his work. From 1945 to 1948, he completed an apprenticeship in stone sculpture while also studying at the Bern School of Applied Arts.

Through his work at the Kunsthalle Bern, Luginbühl was introduced by its director to the work of Julio González, Alexander Calder and Eduardo Chillida. In 1949, he turned to iron, and was largely self-taught in the medium. By 1953, he was working almost exclusively in iron sculpture.

Luginbühl married the ceramicist and sculptor Ursi Koelner. In 1966, he moved to a farmhouse in Mötschwil, which became the principal setting for his creative work. Apart from periods spent in Hamburg and Berlin between 1979 and 1981, Luginbühl remained based in Mötschwil.

Luginbühl maintained a close friendship with fellow Swiss sculptor Jean Tinguely until Tinguely’s death in 1991. From the 1980s, he sometimes produced iron sculptures with his sons Brutus, Basil and Iwan. He died in Langnau im Emmental on 19 February 2011.

== Work ==
Luginbühl worked primarily as an iron sculptor and also produced drawings, prints and films. He produced approximately 1,500 sculptures and an extensive body of prints. His earliest surviving drawing, made in 1946, depicts a dinosaur. After adopting iron in 1949, he initially created small geometric-abstract sculptures alongside more naturalistic works based on animal forms. His first iron sculpture that year was a bull constructed from sheet metal. Luginbühl later destroyed it and his other early figurative works.

Using iron, steel and scrap metal, he created bulky, creature-like forms. Two of his lesser-known sculptures portrayed a butcher and a forester and were made from knives and saws. During the 1950s and 1960s, his sculptures grew larger and increasingly monumental. His friendship with Tinguely contributed to the emergence of the Atlas series, which featured large rolling iron spheres.

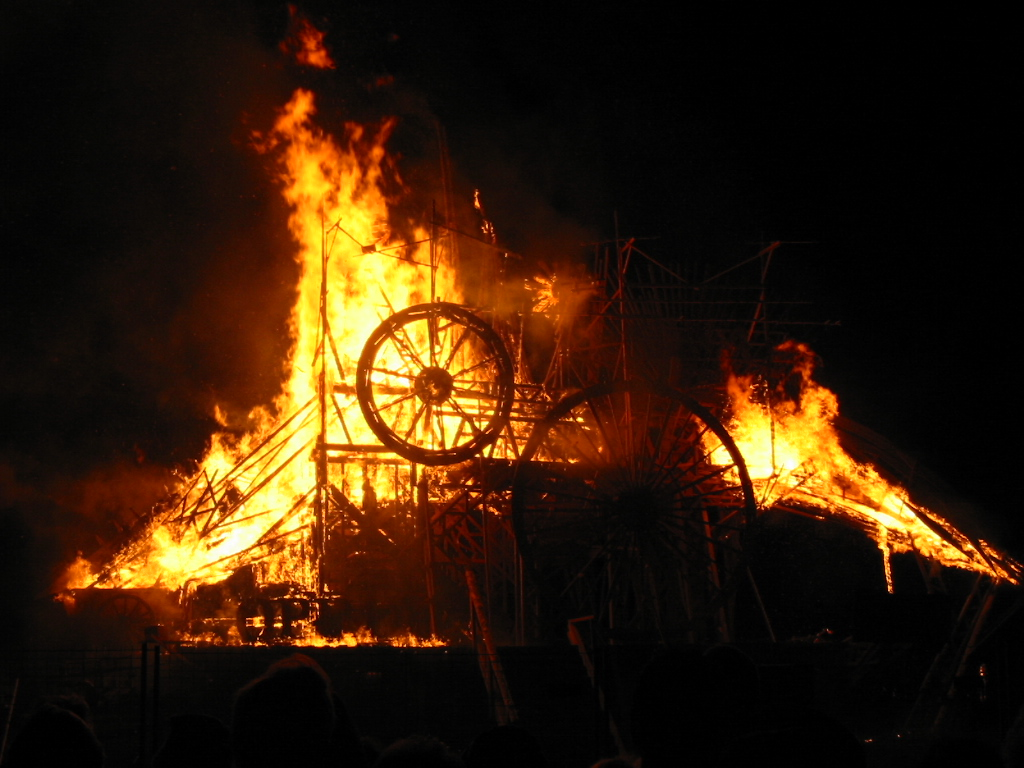
Signal (2002) burning on Mont Vully

His filmmaking included Kleiner Emmentalfilm (1970), a documentary about rural modernisation that criticised the loss of Bernese farmhouses. Beginning in 1976, he also staged burning actions involving large wooden constructions, ignition devices and fireworks.

His work is held in public collections including the Kunstmuseum Bern, the Musée d’Art et d’Histoire in Geneva, the Hamburger Kunsthalle, the Kunstmuseum Winterthur and the Kunsthaus Zürich.

== Exhibitions ==
Luginbühl exhibited at the Venice Biennale in 1956 and 1964, and at documenta III in Kassel in 1964. In 1967, his monumental sculpture Tell (1966) was shown at Expo 67 in Montreal as part of the Swiss Pavilion. By the early 1970s, retrospectives at several European museums and commissions from different continents had established his international reputation. He later participated in documenta 6 in 1977.

In 2000, works by Luginbühl, his wife Ursi and their sons Brutus, Basil and Iwan were presented in Sydney in a family exhibition running from 1 September to 29 October. Bernhard Luginbühl’s own contribution was Australian Angel, a six-metre metal sculpture installed beneath the Sydney Harbour Bridge.

In 2003, the Museum of Fine Arts Bern and the Museum Tinguely in Basel jointly presented the retrospective Luginbühl total. The Basel exhibition centred on Zwilling (2003), Kanonenturm and other monumental iron sculptures, while the Bern exhibition focused primarily on groups of works from the 1950s to the 1980s. The accompanying catalogue documented 1,316 sculptures produced between 1947 and the end of 2002.

== Legacy ==
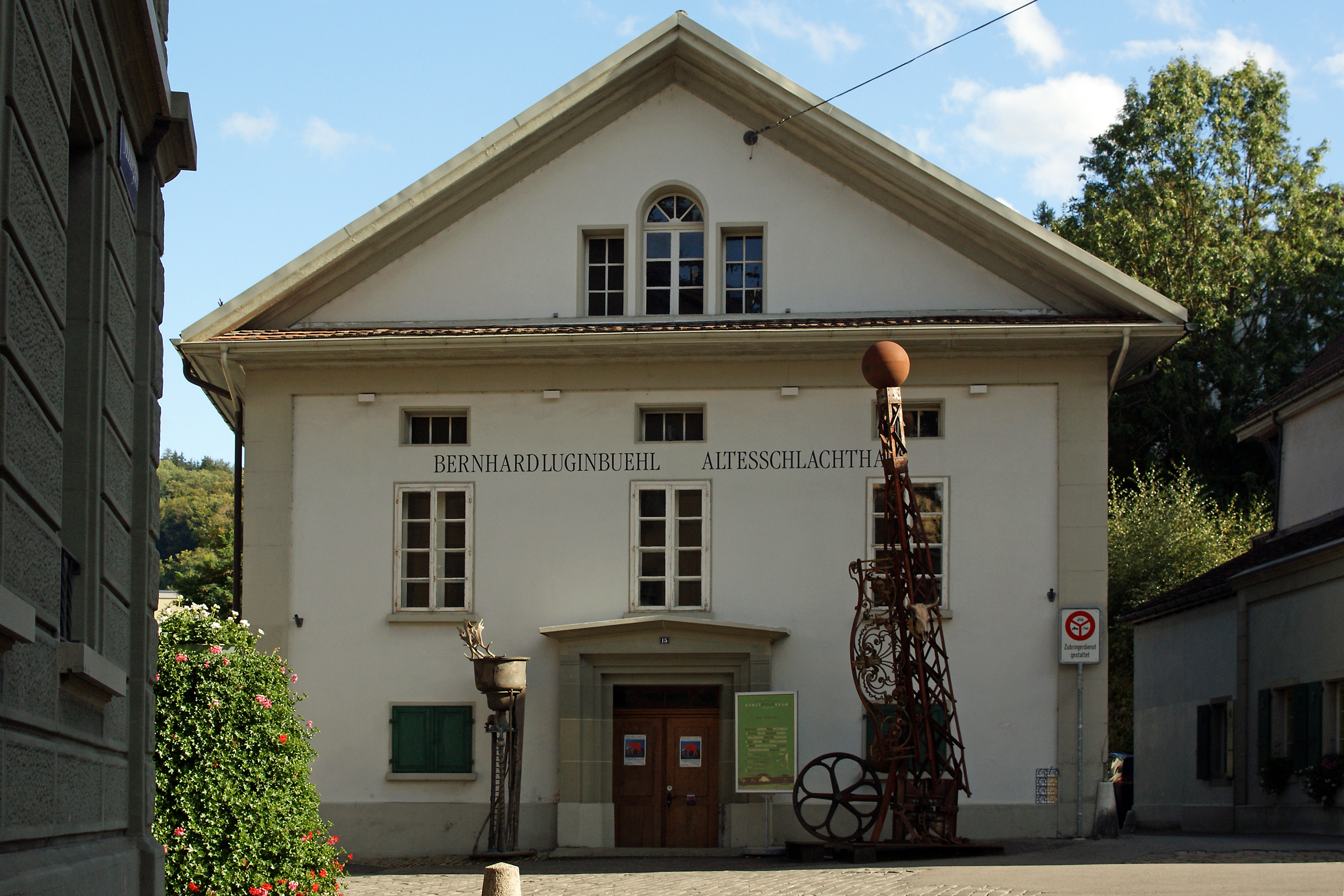
Museum Bernhard Luginbühl in the former slaughterhouse in Burgdorf

Since 1998, the grounds of Luginbühl’s former home in Mötschwil have been open to the public as a sculpture park, where 59 of his iron sculptures are displayed. He donated the works to the foundation he had established to preserve their presentation according to his wishes, and arranged their placement in the park with his family. His family and the Bernhard Luginbühl Foundation maintain the site. Alongside his large iron sculptures, the park displays examples of his graphic work and documentation of his burning actions.

In 2004, the Museum Bernhard Luginbühl opened in Burgdorf’s former slaughterhouse, with the Verein Bernhard Luginbühl responsible for its operation. In 2019, Luginbühl’s heirs donated his diaries to the Graphic Collection of the Swiss National Library.

== Gallery ==
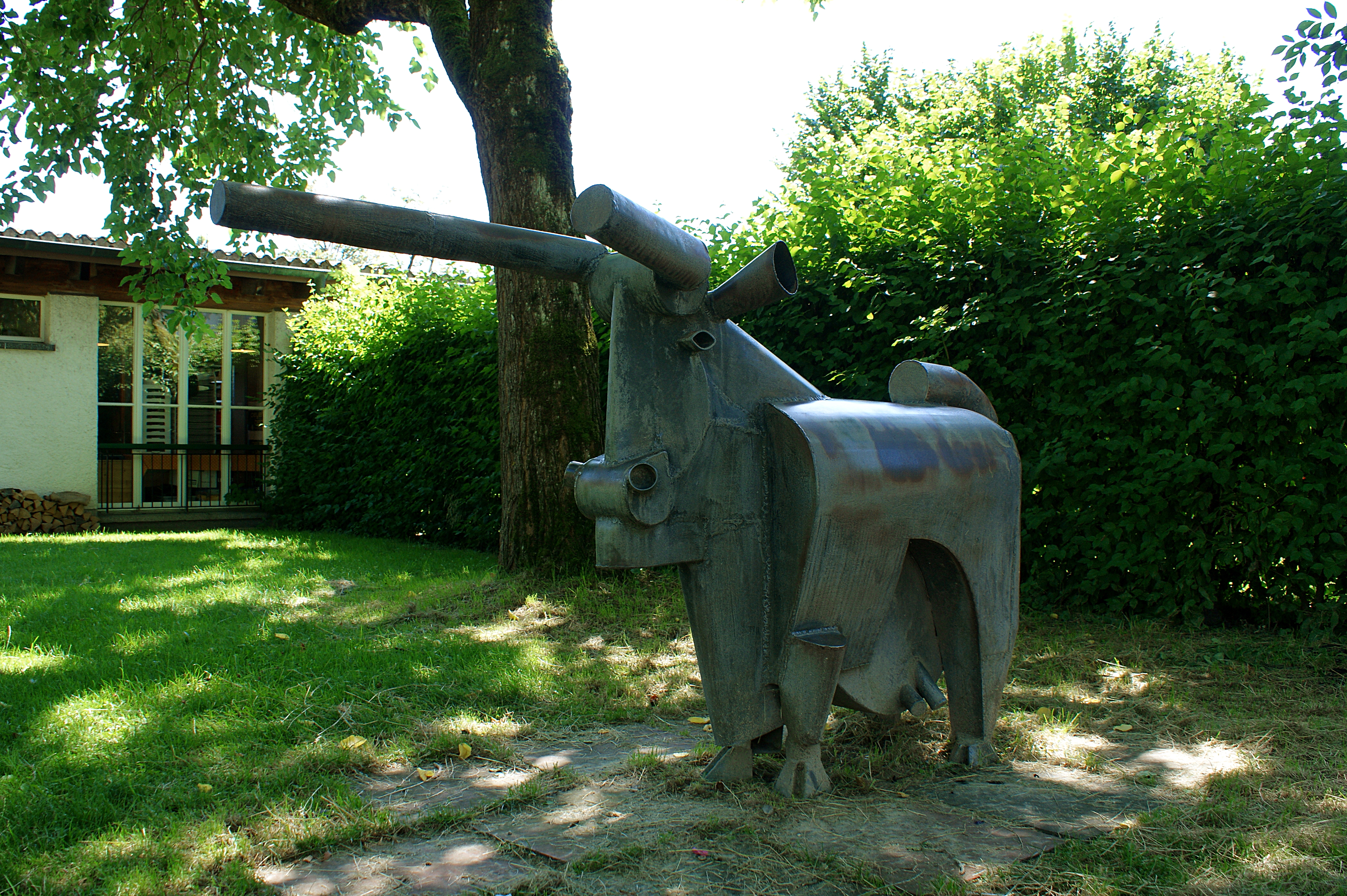
Kuh (1958)

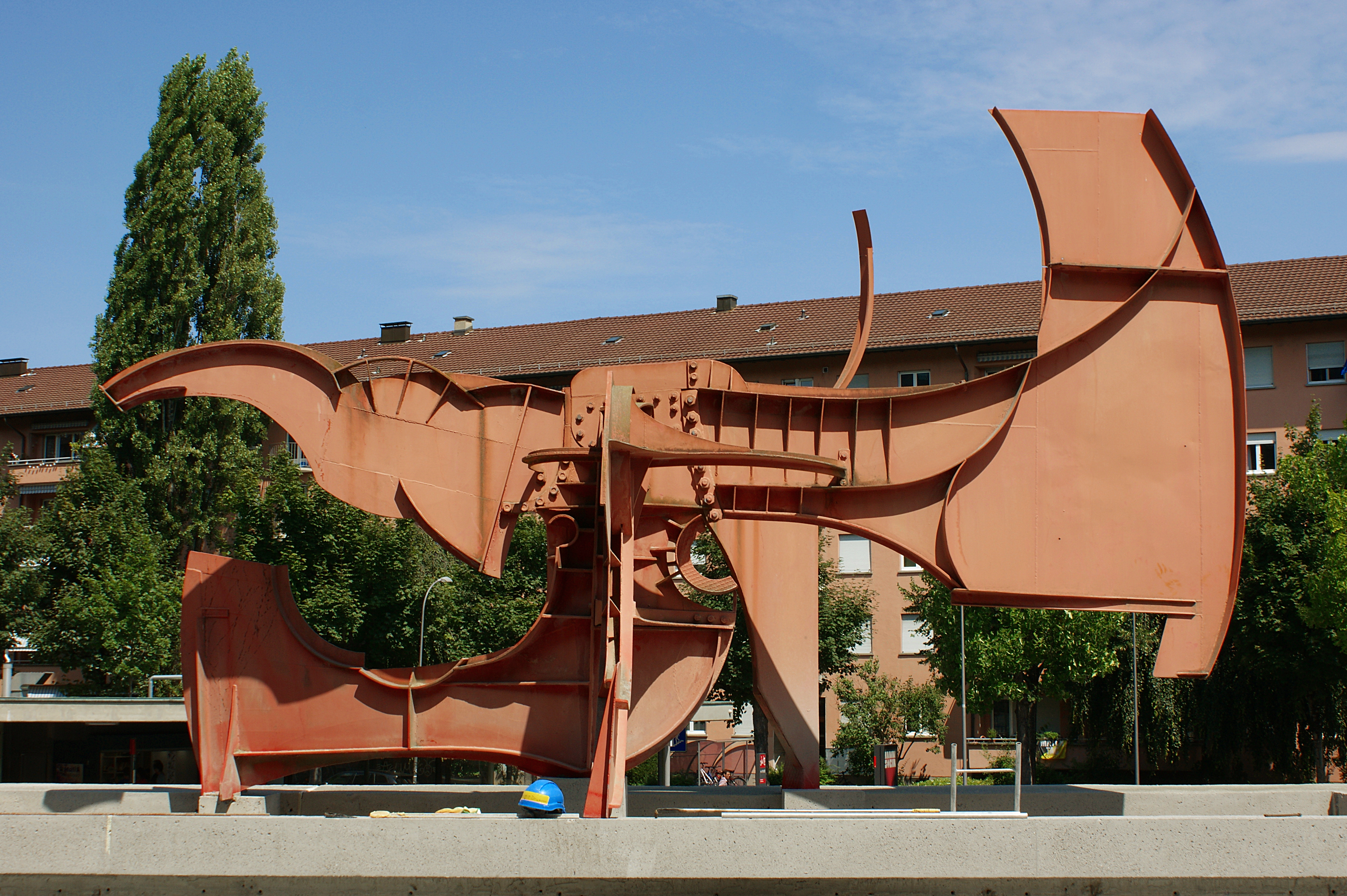
Tell (1966)

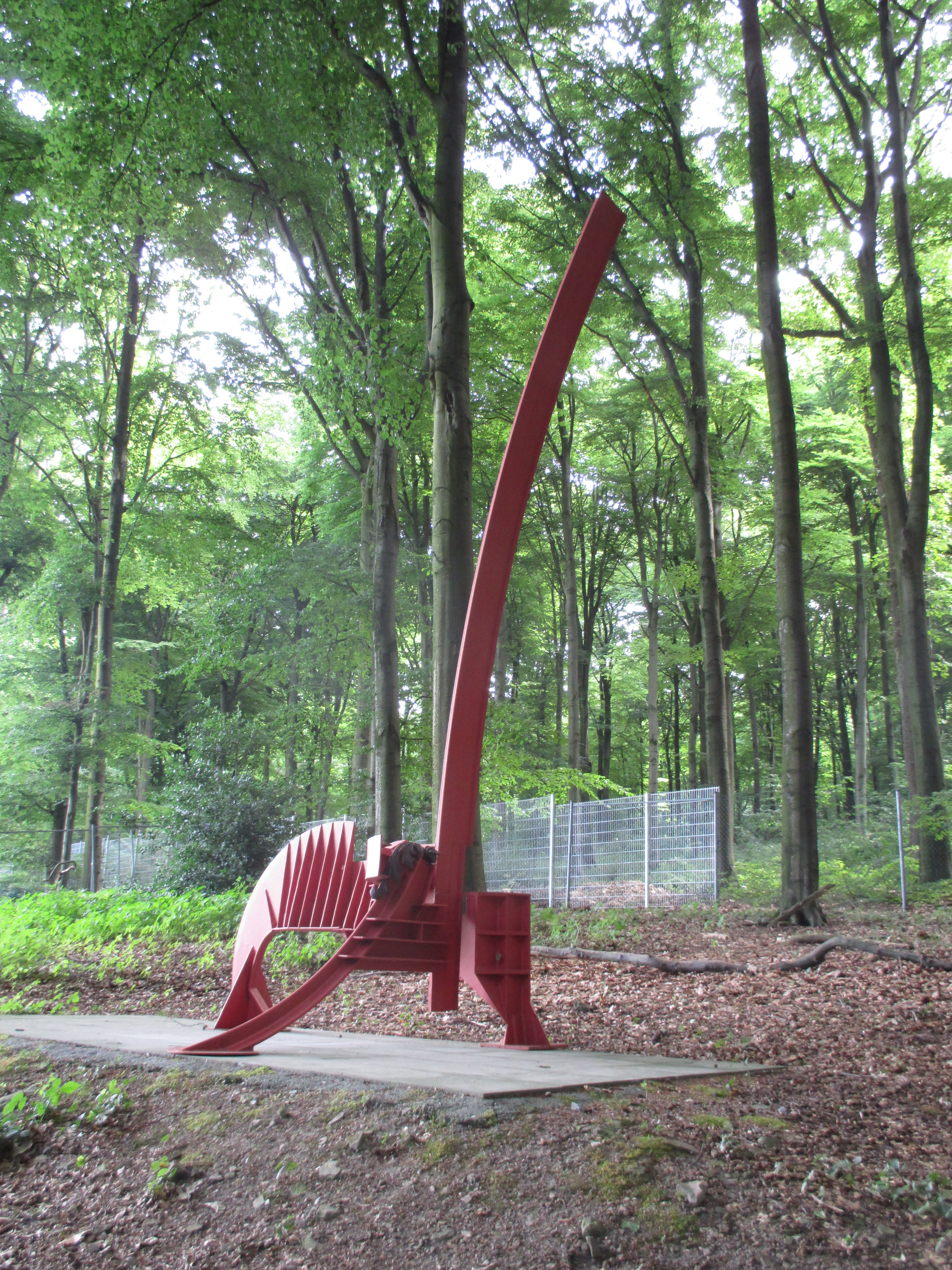
Pegasus (1967), Skulpturenpark Waldfrieden

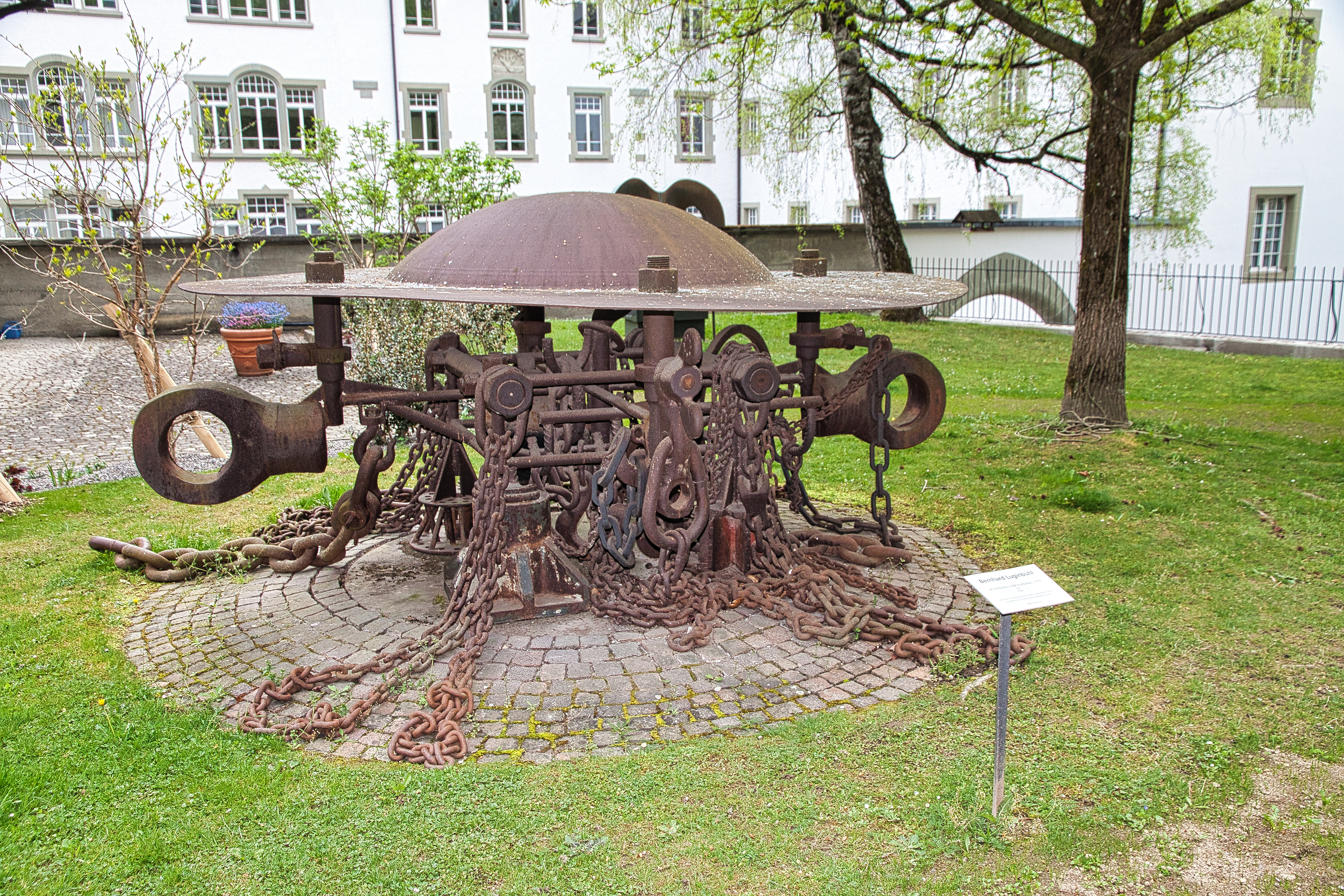
Der Kardinal (1979), Fribourg

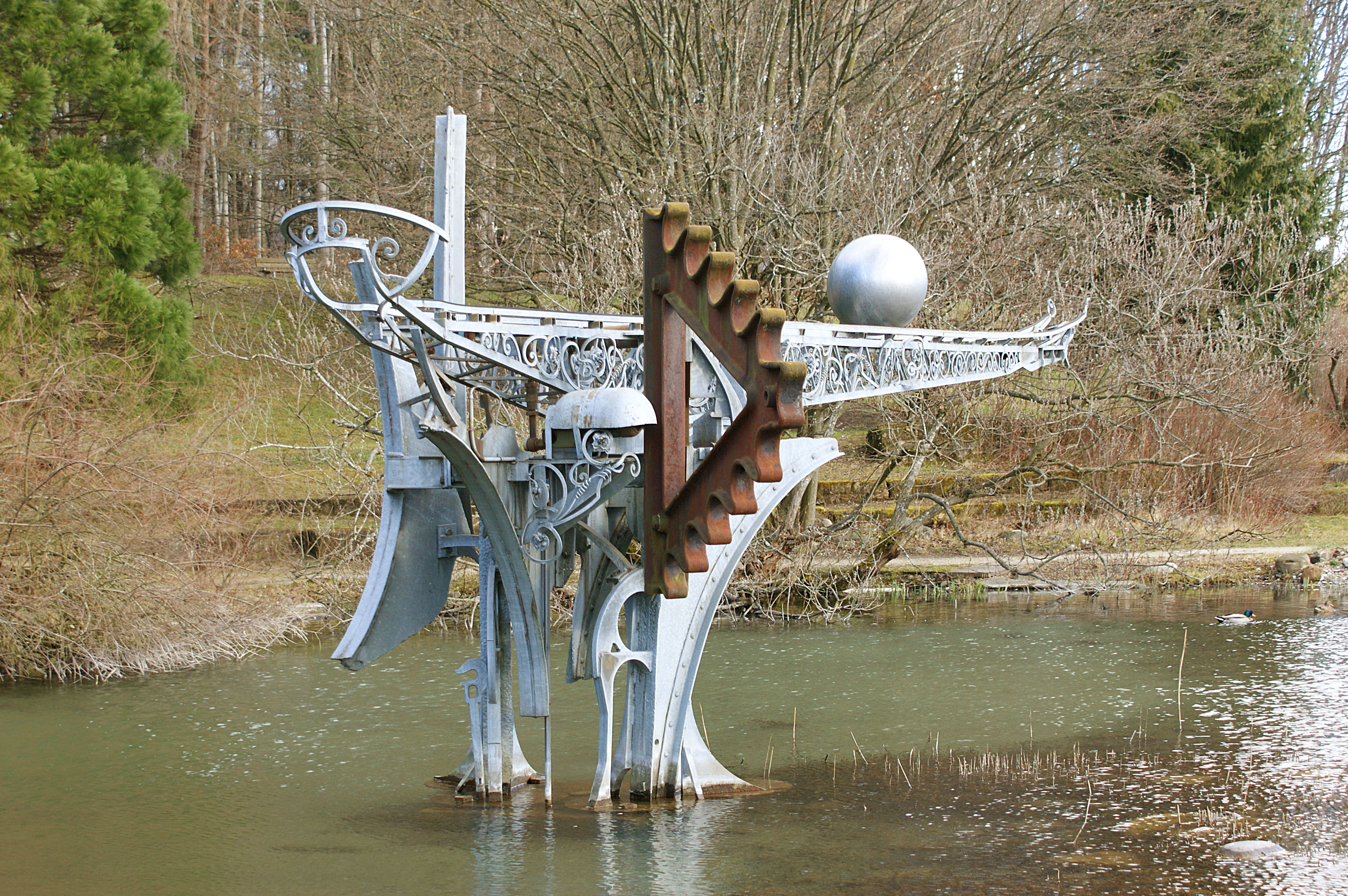
Silberschwan (1981)

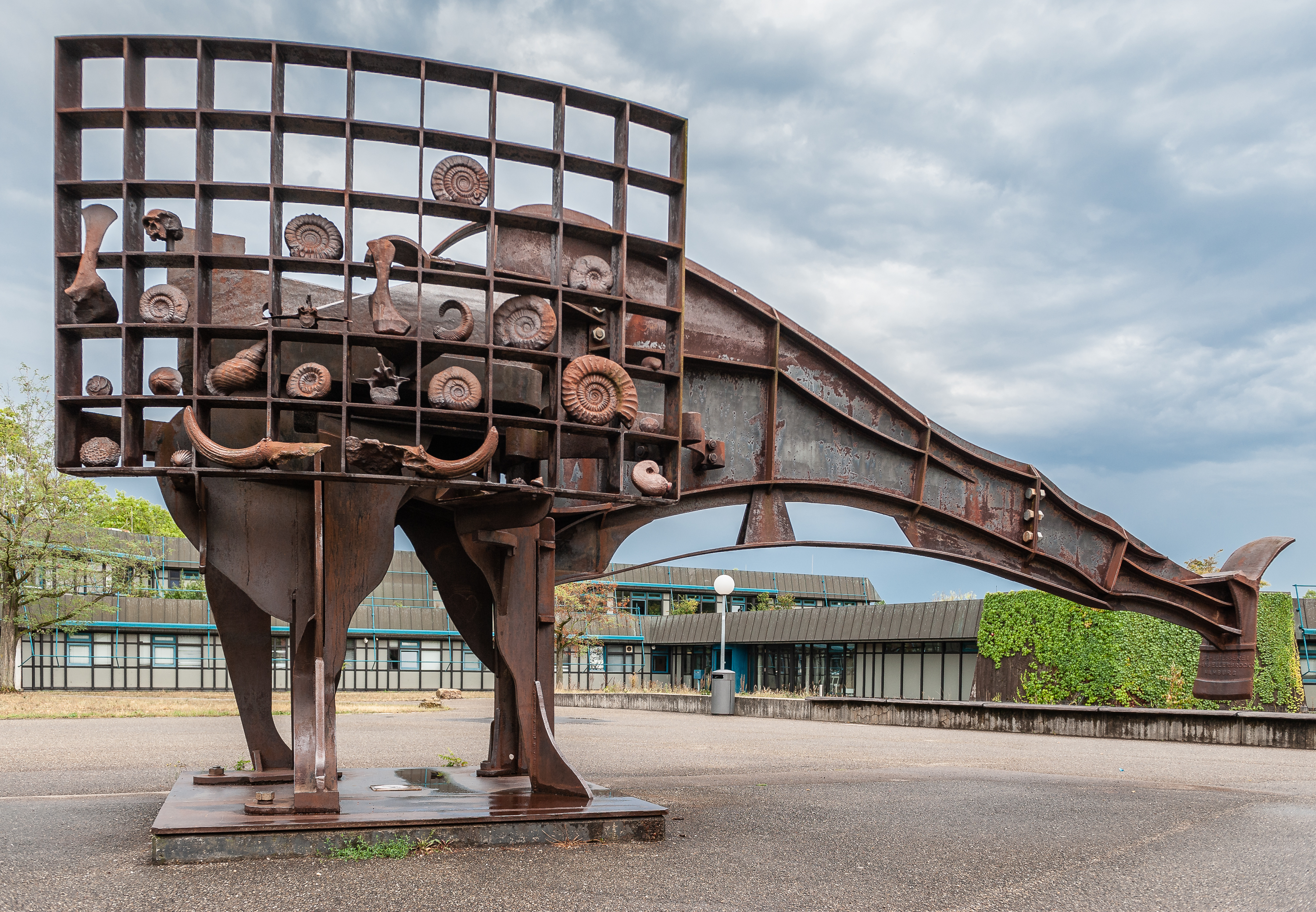
Saurier (1982–1984), Stuttgart

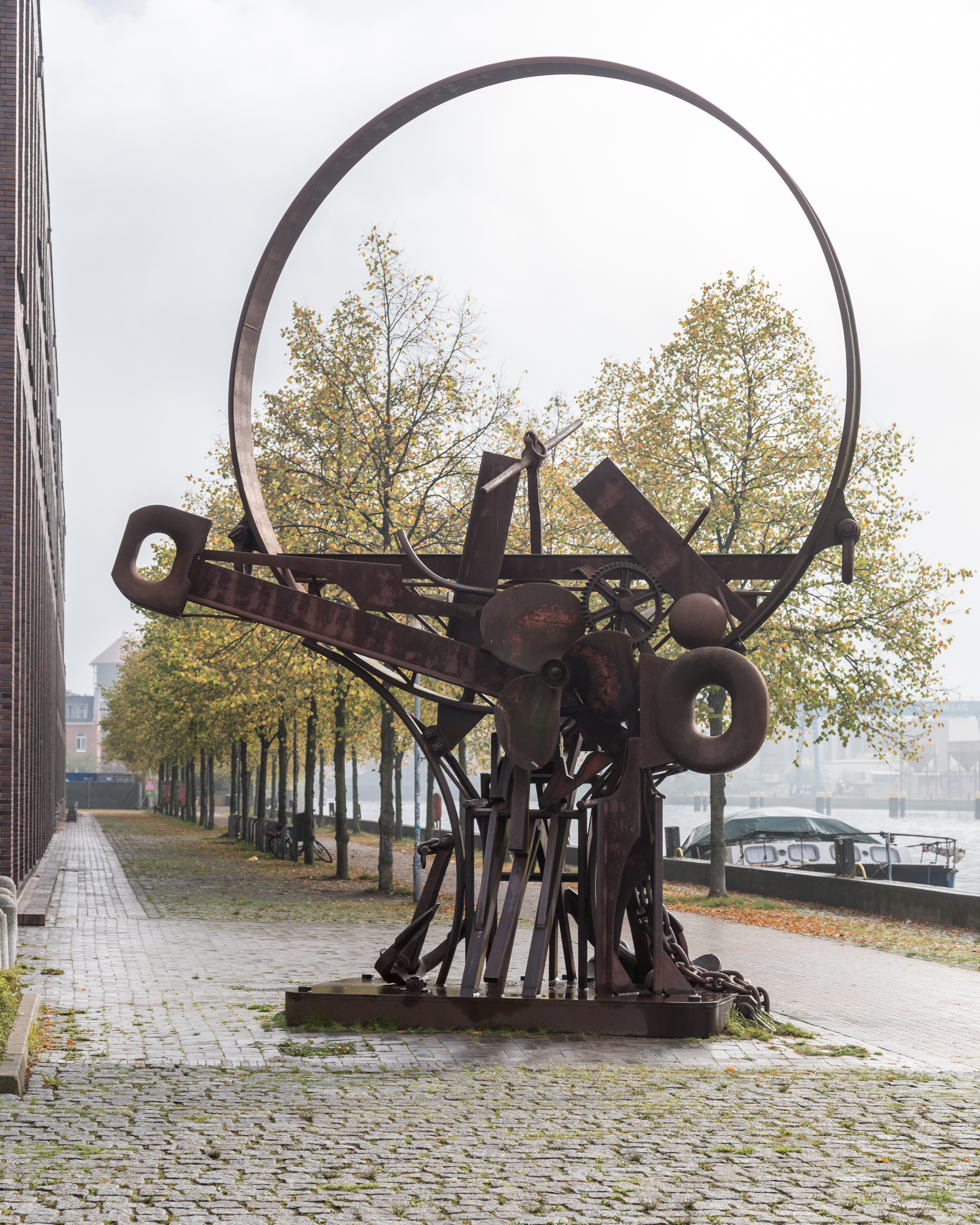
Oldenburgerring (1992–1993), Oldenburg

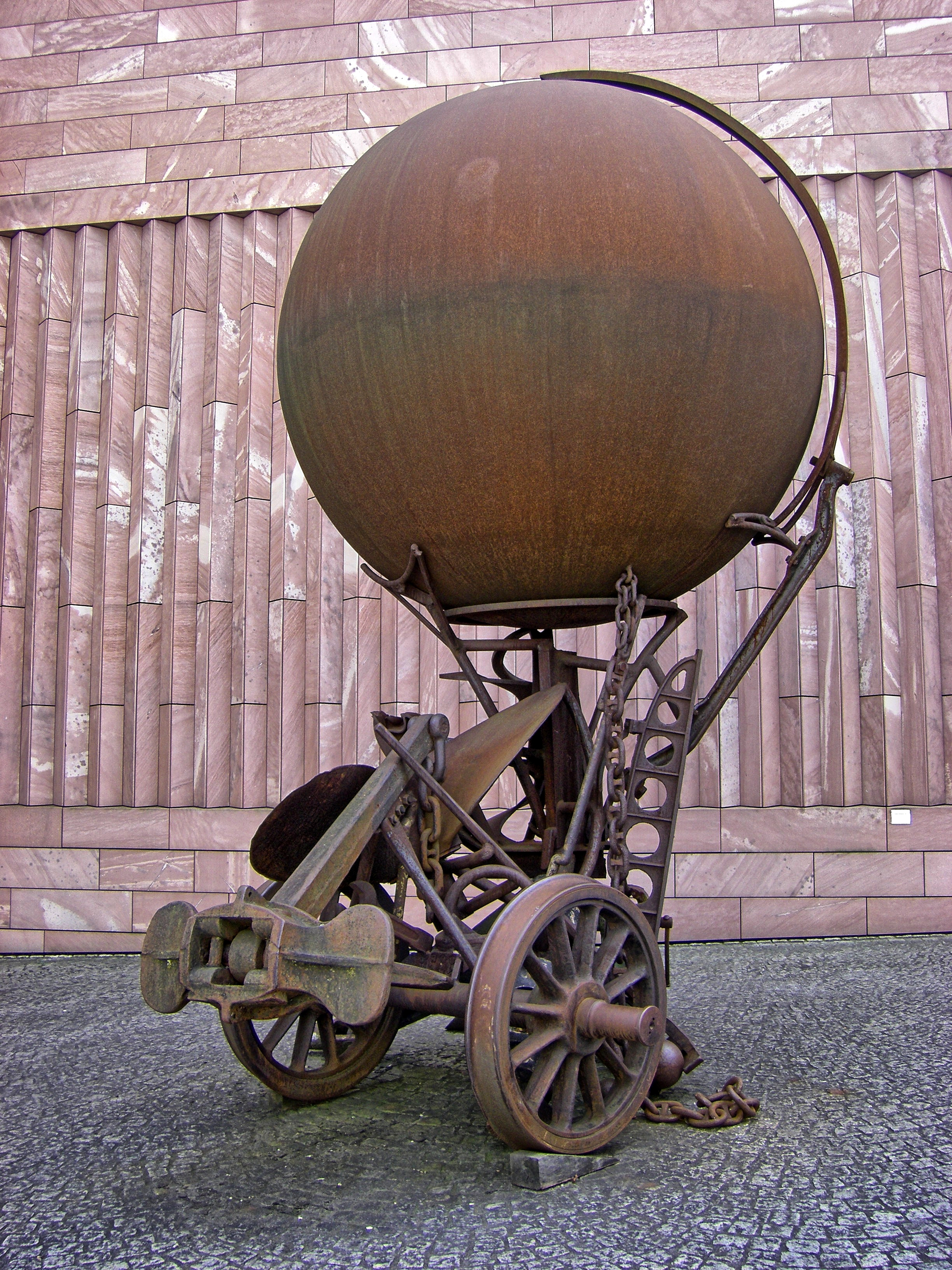
Dickfigur Beteigeuze (1996), Museum Tinguely, Basel
