= Stravinsky Fountain =

Fountain in Paris, France

Coordinates: 48.8595°N 2.3515°E

- La Fontaine Stravinsky (French)
- Artist: Jean Tinguely; Niki de Saint Phalle
- Year: 1983
- Type: Fiber-reinforced plastic, steel
- Location: near to Centre Pompidou; Paris, France

The Stravinsky Fountain (French: La Fontaine Stravinsky) is a whimsical public fountain ornamented with sixteen works of sculpture, moving and spraying water, representing the works of composer Igor Stravinsky. It was created in 1983 by sculptors Jean Tinguely and Niki de Saint Phalle, and is located on Place Stravinsky, next to the Centre Pompidou, in Paris.

== Description ==
The Stravinsky Fountain is a shallow basin of 580 square metres (6,200 sq ft) located in Place Stravinsky, between the Centre Pompidou and the Church of Saint-Merri. Within the basin are sixteen works of sculpture inspired by the compositions of Igor Stravinsky. The black mechanical pieces of sculpture are by Jean Tinguely; the brightly colored works are by Niki de Saint Phalle.

The sculptures in the fountain represent:

- L'Oiseau de feu (The Firebird)
- La Clef de Sol (The Musical Key of G)
- La Spirale (The Spiral)
- L'Elephant (The Elephant)
- Le Renard (The Fox)
- Le Serpent (The Serpent)
- La Grenouille (The Frog)
- La Diagonale (The Diagonal)
- La Mort (Death)
- La Sirène (The Mermaid)
- Le Rossignol (The Nightingale)
- L'Amour (Love)
- La Vie (Life)
- Le Cœur (The Heart)
- Le Chapeau de Clown (The Clown's Hat)
- Ragtime (Ragtime)

The basin covers some of the rooms and offices of IRCAM (Institut de Recherche et Coordination Acoustique/Musique), an organization devoted to promoting modern music and musicology, connected with the Pompidou Center. The founder of IRCAM, composer and conductor Pierre Boulez, suggested the work of Stravinsky as a theme for the fountain. Because of the offices and rooms below, the fountain was designed to be as lightweight as possible, with very shallow water, a lining of stainless steel, and sculptures composed of plastics and other light materials.

== History ==
The Stravinsky Fountain was part of a sculptural program, launched by the City of Paris in 1978, to build seven contemporary fountains with sculpture in different squares of the city. This project also included new fountains at the Hotel de Ville and within the gardens of the Palais Royal. They were to be the first public fountains built in Paris since the fountains of the Palais de Chaillot were built for the Paris Exposition of 1937. It was also a major project by the City of Paris to redevelop the area around the old city markets, Les Halles, which had been torn down in 1971, and to re-animate the area with pedestrian streets, squares, and works of art.

In October, 1981, the mayor of Paris, Jacques Chirac, announced that a new fountain would be built near the Centre Pompidou, and announced that Jean Tinguely and Niki de Saint Phalle had been selected to design the fountain. "Such a work must necessarily have modern lines, marrying with those of the Centre Pompidou", Chirac said, and he noted the success of a fountain that Tinguely had recently installed. The City of Paris paid two million French francs for the project, which was matched by two million francs from Jack Lang, the Minister of Culture. The financial agreement was formally signed on December 15, 1982, allowing the project to go ahead. Other contributions came from private sponsors: the Société Lyonnaise des eaux (500,000 francs), the Fondation Scaler (150,000 francs), and the Swiss government.

One sensitive artistic issue had to be resolved: the commission had originally been given to Jean Tinguely alone, and therefore the work would have been entirely composed of his black-painted mechanical sculptures. But in May 1982, he asked that brightly colored works by Niki de Saint Phalle (who was also Tinguely's wife) be included. This caused concerns at the Sous-Direction du Patromoine culturel of the Bureau of Monuments of Paris, which had originally commissioned the sculpture; they feared that the brightly colored works of Niki de Saint Phalle would visually overwhelm the dark-colored works of Tinguely. Officials of the Ministry of Culture and Sous-Direction du Patrimoine persuaded Tinguely to reduce the number of works by Niki de Saint Phalle to four or five, and both the Ministry of Culture and City of Paris then agreed that it would be a joint project by Tinguely and Saint Phalle.

A few technical issues also needed to be resolved. Tingueley did not want the water to be chemically treated, and preferred that moss be allowed to grow. Tinguely also wanted to use very-low-power electric motors for the fountains, to avoid any danger of electrocuting people wading in the fountains. The sculptures were not attached to the bottom of the basin, but simply placed there.

The finished fountain was dedicated on March 16, 1983, by Mayor Chirac, Minister of Culture Jack Lang, and Madame Pompidou, the widow of President Georges Pompidou. During the ceremony, Chirac and Lang, who were political enemies, avoided looking or speaking to each other.

Under French law and practice, the French state has the legal obligation to maintain fountains, but artists and their descendants have the moral right to control their work. In 1985, Niki de Saint Phalle asked for modifications to be made to one part of the sculpture, Rossignol, to make it more harmonious with other parts of the work. Five years later, she asked that one sculpture, Sirène, be replaced by another earlier work by her, called Nana, seated in a bathing suit. Because of the cost, the substitution was never made.

== Tinguely on the fountain ==
- "I wanted [the fountain] to have charm, with the colors of Niki, the movement of the water, and a certain attachment of the heart that I gave to my sculptures. I didn't want artifices of color in the California style, with jets of water that were electronically controlled, things mysterious and bizarre. I wanted sculptures like street performers, a little bit like a circus, which was at the heart of Stravinsky's style itself when in 1914 he had his first encounter with jazz, thanks to the recordings which Ernest Ansermet brought from the United States, or when he wrote an homage to a circus elephant, all made up in colors, which he saw in a circus in Evian or Lausanne."
- "... the first model that I made for Pierre Boulez, even though it was very small, had lots of colors. I didn't want, after Basel, to install another black machine. Paris has a completely different speed than Basel. It's a city of light, it's practically the center of the world, and there was that superb monstrosity, the Centre Pompidou – it was an enormous provocation, and I couldn't put something monumental next to it..."
- "The only way to do it was to go to the opposite [of the Pompidou Centre]; to think in terms of psychology, of speed, of movement, of charm, of games, of jokes, of competing with the street performers, the Afro-Cuban orchestras, the fire-eaters, who were in front of the Centre. That's why it had to have colors, the gold of the Firebird. I wanted an alarm clock, an answer to the daylight...."
- "...I studied the place during an entire year. I looked at the sun. I observed the wind. That determined for me the placement of the sculptures, and the orientation of the fountains...."
- "[Niki de Saint Phalle] began by making a large number of models; hats by the dozen, numbers of elephants, serpents, things, tricks... the Firebird was a found object in the work of Niki de Saint Phalle, but she redrew it, repainted it, until we had exactly what we needed, not too big and with holes to let the wind pass through to avoid it being carried away by the wind which is always blowing in the square of the Beaubourg...

== Critical reaction ==
- "...Niki de Saint Phalle has never better realized her phantasmagoric menagerie of symbols, painted with knowing truculence. She takes charge of the stage, and that's normal; she has color going for her, as violent and brilliant as the flowing water. Tinguely, who is the creator of the ensemble, dealt with the mechanical components of the work. A sculptor in the dada tradition, his visual humor plays with absurdity and provocation....Tinguely has made a Parisian fountain, picturesque and with the charm of a mechanical music box of the eighteenth century.." (Le Monde, March 19, 1983)
- "Niki de Saint Phalle was very beautiful, Madame Claude Pompidou was very dignified, the fountain is droll and gay, and the children laughed, It was a beautiful opening. " (Le Matin, March 17, 1983).

== See also ==
- Fountains in Paris – Decorative features in Paris
- Chaos I – Kinetic artwork by Jean Tinguely

== Bibliography ==
- Hortense Lyon, La Fontaine Stravinsky, Collection Baccauréate arts plastiques 2004, Centre national de documentation pédagogique
- Paris et ses fontaines, de la Renaissance à nos jours, Directed by Beatrice de Andia, collection of texts by Dominique Massounie, Pauline Prevost-Marcilhacy and Daniel Rabreau, Collection Paris et son Patrimoine, Paris, 1995
