= Jean Tinguely =

Swiss sculptor (1925–1991)

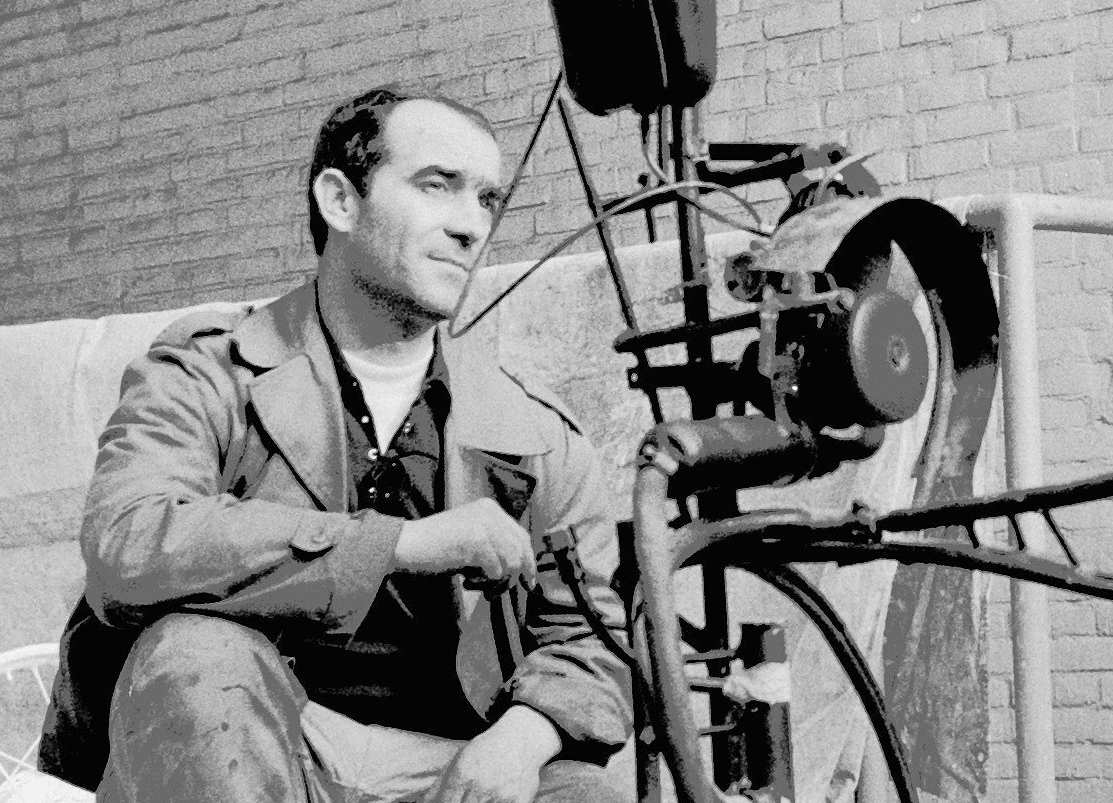
- Jean Tinguely, 1961
- Born: 22 May 1925; Fribourg, Switzerland
- Died: 30 August 1991 (aged 66); Bern, Switzerland
- Known for: Painting, Sculpture
- Spouses: Eva Aeppli (1951–1960); Niki de Saint Phalle (1971–1991)
- Partner: Milena Palakarkina (1986–1991)

Jean Tinguely (22 May 1925 – 30 August 1991) was a Swiss sculptor best known for his kinetic art sculptural machines (known officially as Métamatics) that extended the Dada tradition into the later part of the 20th century. Tinguely's art satirized automation and the technological overproduction of material goods.

== Life ==
Born in Fribourg, Tinguely grew up in Basel. At fifteen he traveled to Albania, with the intention of joining the fight against the forces of Benito Mussolini and the fascist regime then ruling Italy as they took over the nation, but instead he was apprehended at border and imprisoned for three days. From 1941 to 1945, he studied under artist Julia Ris at the Allgemeine Gewerbeschule Basel, where he encountered the work of Kurt Schwitters and other Dadaists, which later influenced his kinetic constructions.

Tinguely married fellow Swiss artist Eva Aeppli in 1951.

He moved to France in 1952 with his first wife, Swiss the aforementioned Eva Aeppli, to pursue a career in art. He belonged to the Parisian avant-garde in the mid-twentieth century and was one of the artists who signed the New Realist's manifesto (Nouveau réalisme) in 1960.

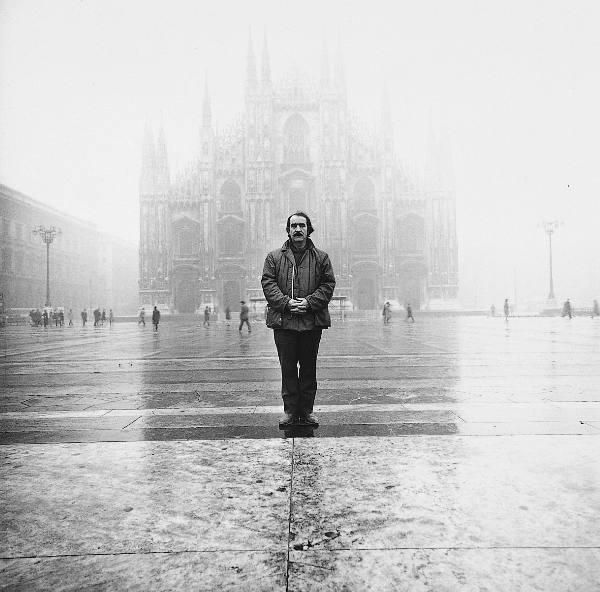
Jean Tinguely portrait by Lothar Wolleh, 1968

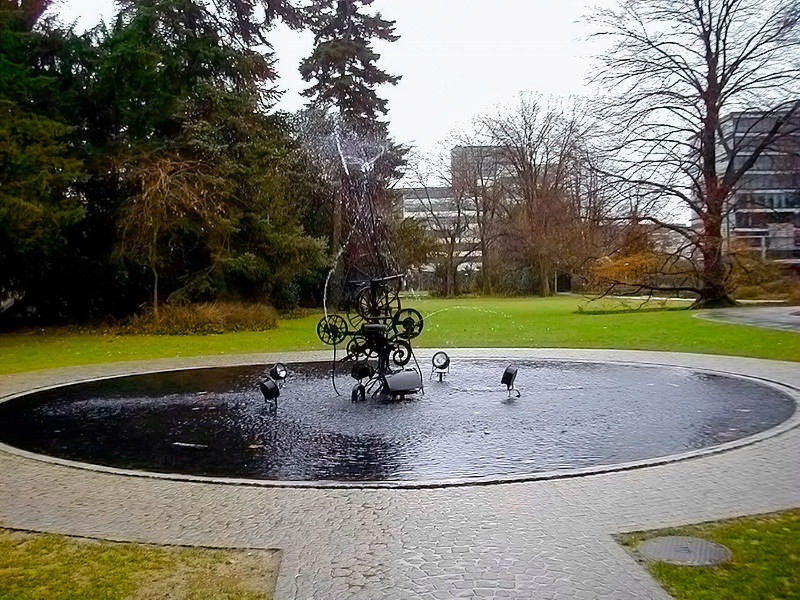
The Tinguely Fountain in front of the Tinguely Museum in Basel

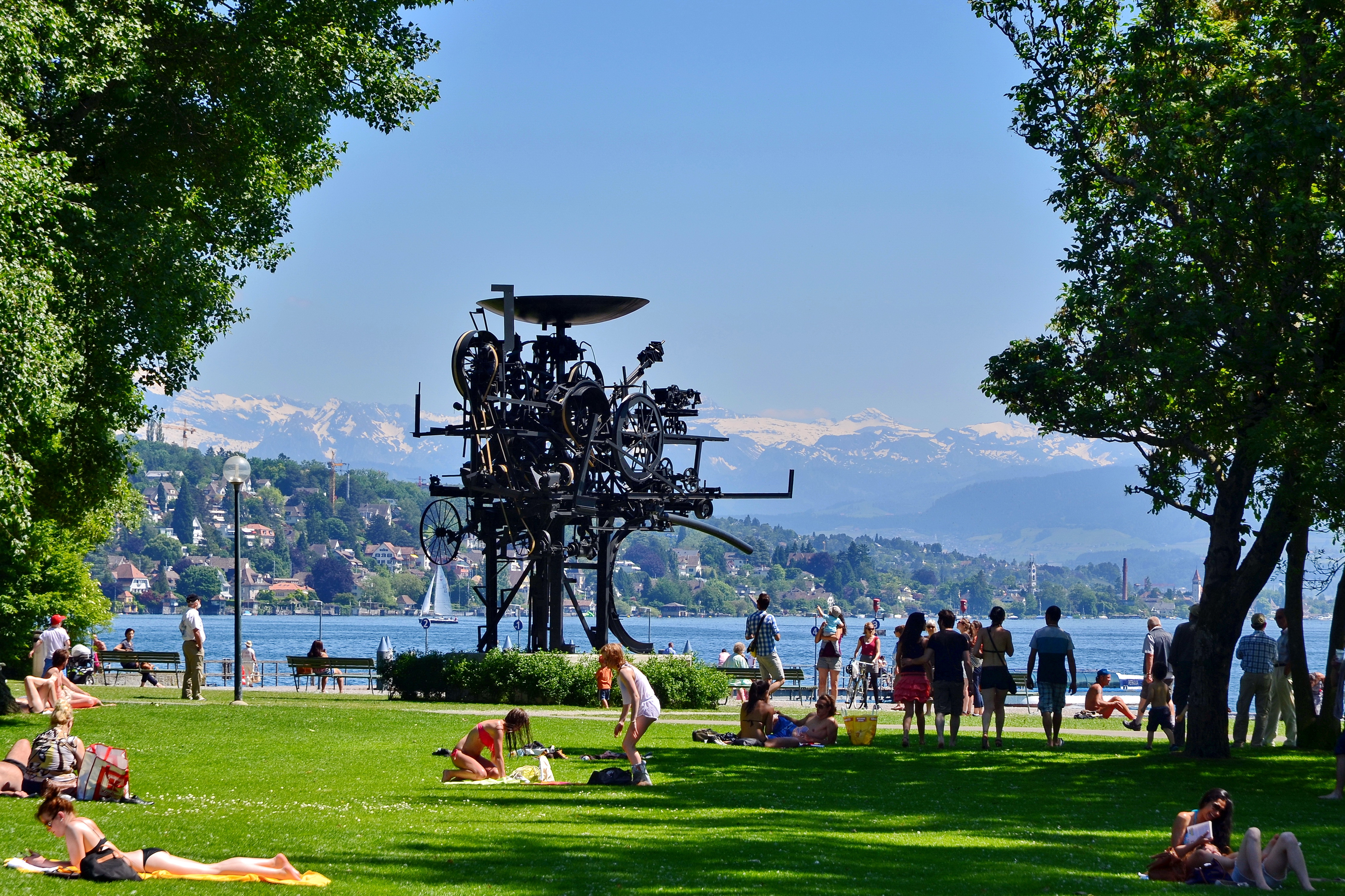
Tinguely's Heureka in Zürich-Seefeld (Zürichhorn)

His best-known work, a self-destroying sculpture titled Homage to New York (1960), only partially self-destructed at the Museum of Modern Art in New York City, although his later work, Study for an End of the World No. 2 (1962), detonated successfully in front of an audience gathered in the desert outside Las Vegas. Then, in 1961, Tinguely's work was included in the landmark "Art of Assemblage" exhibition at MoMA curated by William C. Seitz. Seitz said of Tinguely in the exhibition's catalogue that his "most recent work, influenced by Rauschenberg and Stankiewicz, fuses the tradition of kinetic art with that of assemblage".

In 1971, he married his second wife Niki de Saint Phalle with whom he collaborated on several artistic projects, such as the Hon – en katedral or Le Cyclop. Tinguely and Saint Phalle collaborated artistically for over three decades.

Tinguely died of heart failure in 1991 at the age of 66 in the Inselspital in Bern.

== Legacy ==
There have been three major retrospectives of Tinguely's work in the last few decades, firstly in 1987 at the Palazzo Grassi In 1987 in Venice, secondly the "Jean Tinguely: Machine Spectacle" at the Stedelijk Museum in Amsterdam which ran from October 2016 until March 2017, and thirdly at the Hangar PirelliBicocca in Milan from the fall of 2024 into the early winter of 2025.

=== Jean Tinguely centennial exhibitions in Geneva and Paris ===
To mark one hundred years since the kinetic sculptor's birth, twin exhibitions were mounted to honor Tinguely's playful, machine‑based art. Geneva's Musée Rath focused on rarely exhibited drawings and fountain designs, while Paris's Grand Palais showcased major works like the Stravinsky Fountain.

== Public works ==
- Chaos I (1974), sculpture in The Commons, Columbus, Indiana, US
- Le Cyclop outside of Milly-la-Forêt.
- The Stravinsky Fountain (fr: La Fontaine Stravinsky) near the Centre Pompidou, Paris (1983), a collaboration with Niki de Saint Phalle.
- Carnival Fountain (Fasnachtsbrunnen) (1977) in Basel.
- Tinguely Fountain (1977) in Basel.
- Lifesaver Fountain on Königstrasse in Duisburg, Germany, a collaboration with Niki de Saint Phalle
- Jo Siffert Fountain (commonly called Tinguely Fountain), Fribourg, Switzerland
- La Cascade, sculpture in the Carillon Building lobby, Charlotte, North Carolina, US
- Métamatic generative sculptures (1950s)
- Luminator (1991), on loan until 2014 to the EuroAirport Basel-Mulhouse
- Heureka, (1964) "Zürihorn" at Zürichsee, Zürich Switzerland

=== Hon – en katedral ===
Hon – en katedral (Swedish: "She, a Cathedral") was an art installation made in collaboration with Niki de Saint-Phalle that was shown at the Moderna Museet in Stockholm in 1966. The exhibition consisted of a sculpture of a colorful pregnant woman lying on her back with her legs wide apart. The sculpture was 25–26 meters long, about 6 meters high and 11 metres wide. It was built of scaffolding and chicken wire covered with fabric and fiberglass, painted with brightly coloured poster paint. Through a door-sized entry in the location of the woman's vagina, visitors could go into the sculpture. Inside was a screen showing Greta Garbo films, a goldfish pond, and a soft drink vending machine. Johann Sebastian Bach's organ music played through speakers. The exhibition was created by Saint-Phalle, Tinguely, and Per Olov Ultvedt. It had 80,000 visitors during the exhibition period from 4 June to 9 September 1966.

== Noise music recordings ==
- 1963 "Sounds of Sculpture", 7", Minami Gallery, Tokyo, Japan_[Tinguely's sculptures recorded by avant-garde composer Toshi Ichiyanagi during Japanese exhibition]
- 1972 'Méta', book+7_, Propyläen Verlag, Stockholm
- 1983 'Sculptures at The Tate Gallery, 1982'_, Audio Arts cassette
- 1983 'Meta-Harmonie H' incl. in ‘Meridians 2_ compilation cassette, Touch
- 1994/5 'Bascule VII', 10”, Manhood Records 002
- 2001 'Relief Meta-Mechanique Sonore I' incl. in 'A Diagnosis' compilation, Revolver-Archiv für Aktuelle Kunst, Frankfurt am Main, Germany

== Influence on others ==
- In Arthur Penn's Mickey One (1965) the mime-like Artist (Kamatari Fujiwara) with his self-destructive machine is reminiscent of Tinguely
- Survival Research Laboratories, directed by Mark Pauline (USA)
- Prominent kinetic sculptor Arthur Ganson described Tinguely as his "primary spiritual artistic mentor", and paid homage to him in his work "Tinguely in Moscow".

== Gallery ==
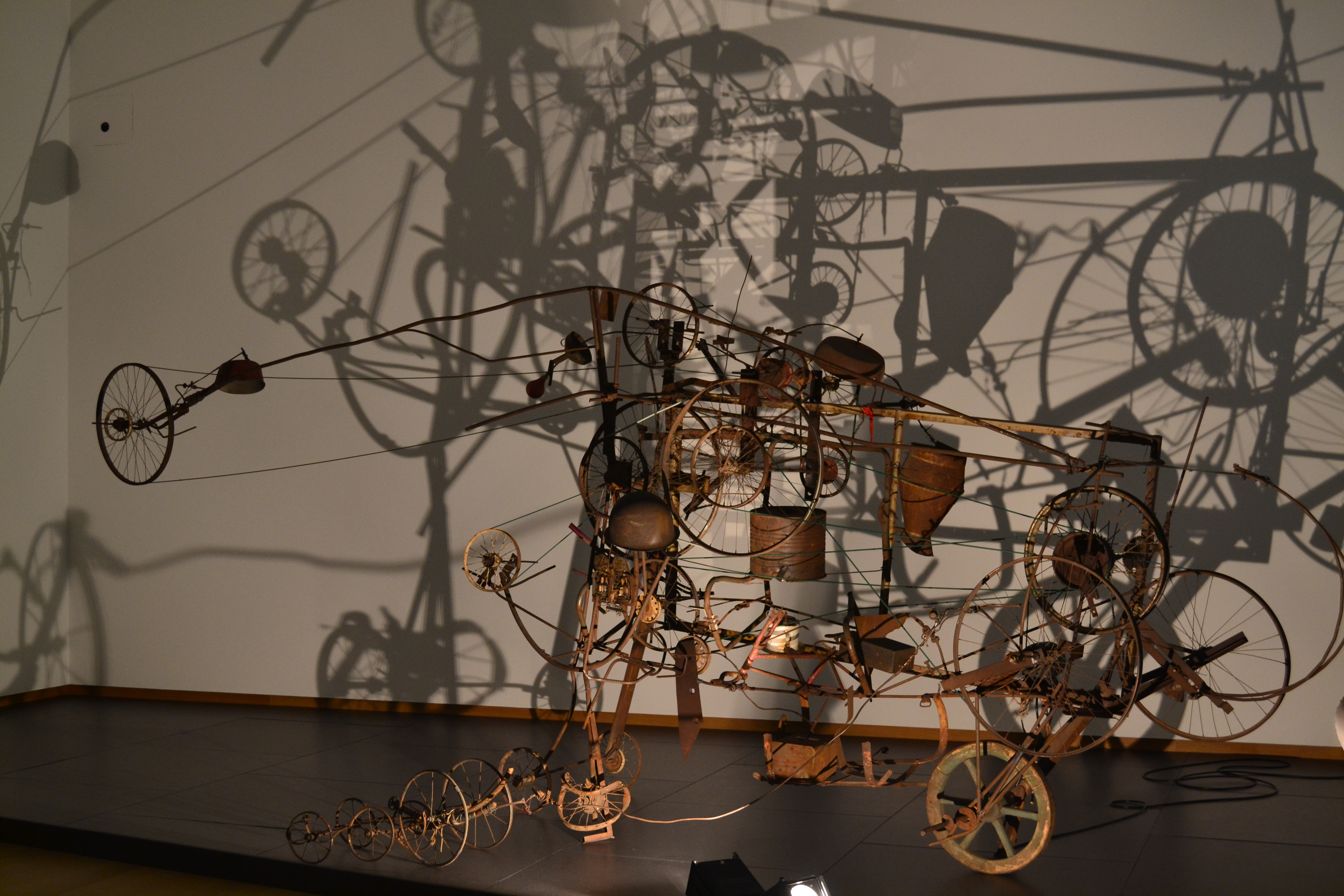
Tinguely, Machines - Le Transport, early 1960s; scrap metal components

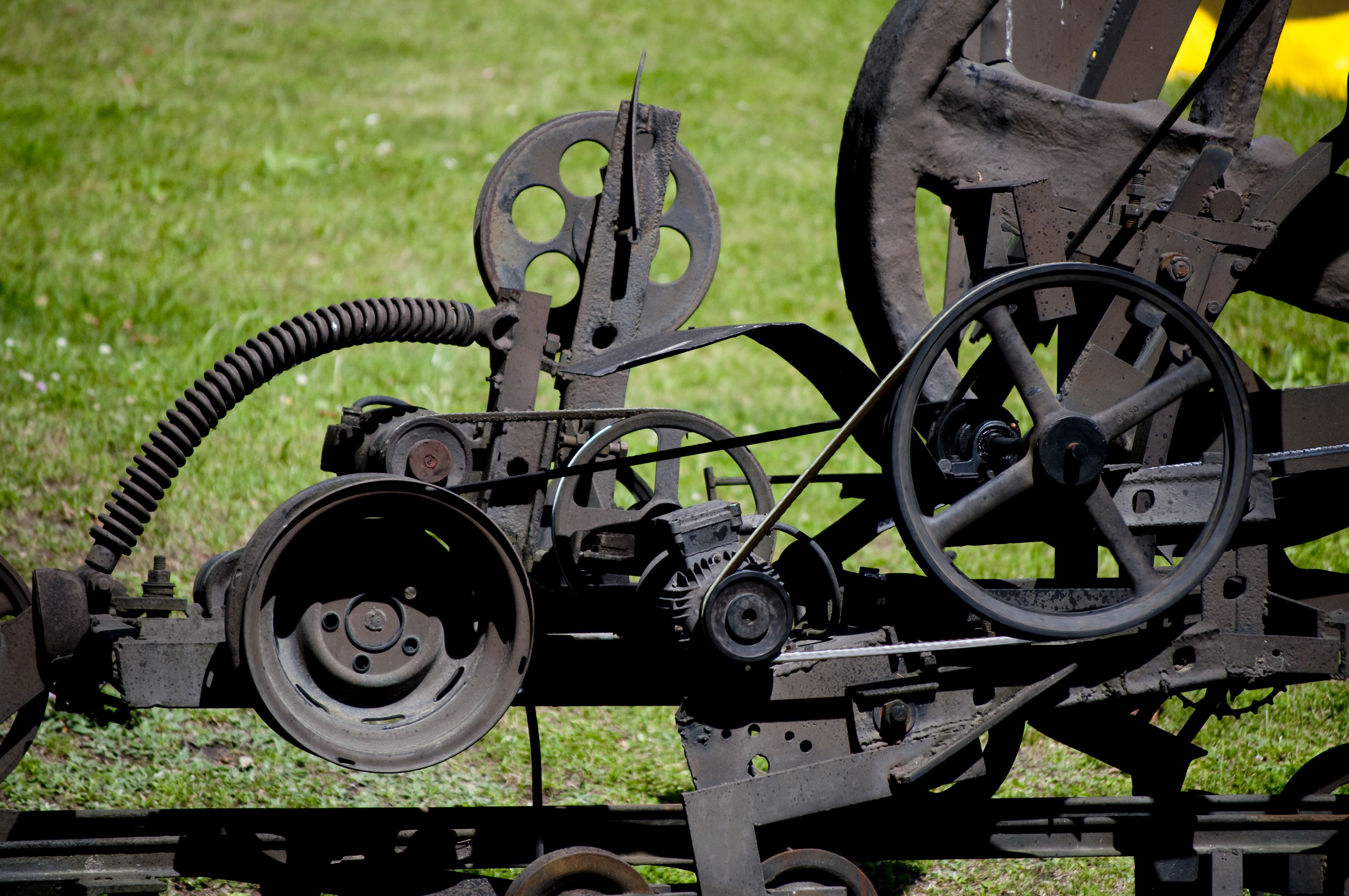
Tinguely, Gears, 1967; scrap old metal components (part of Le Paradis Fantastique)

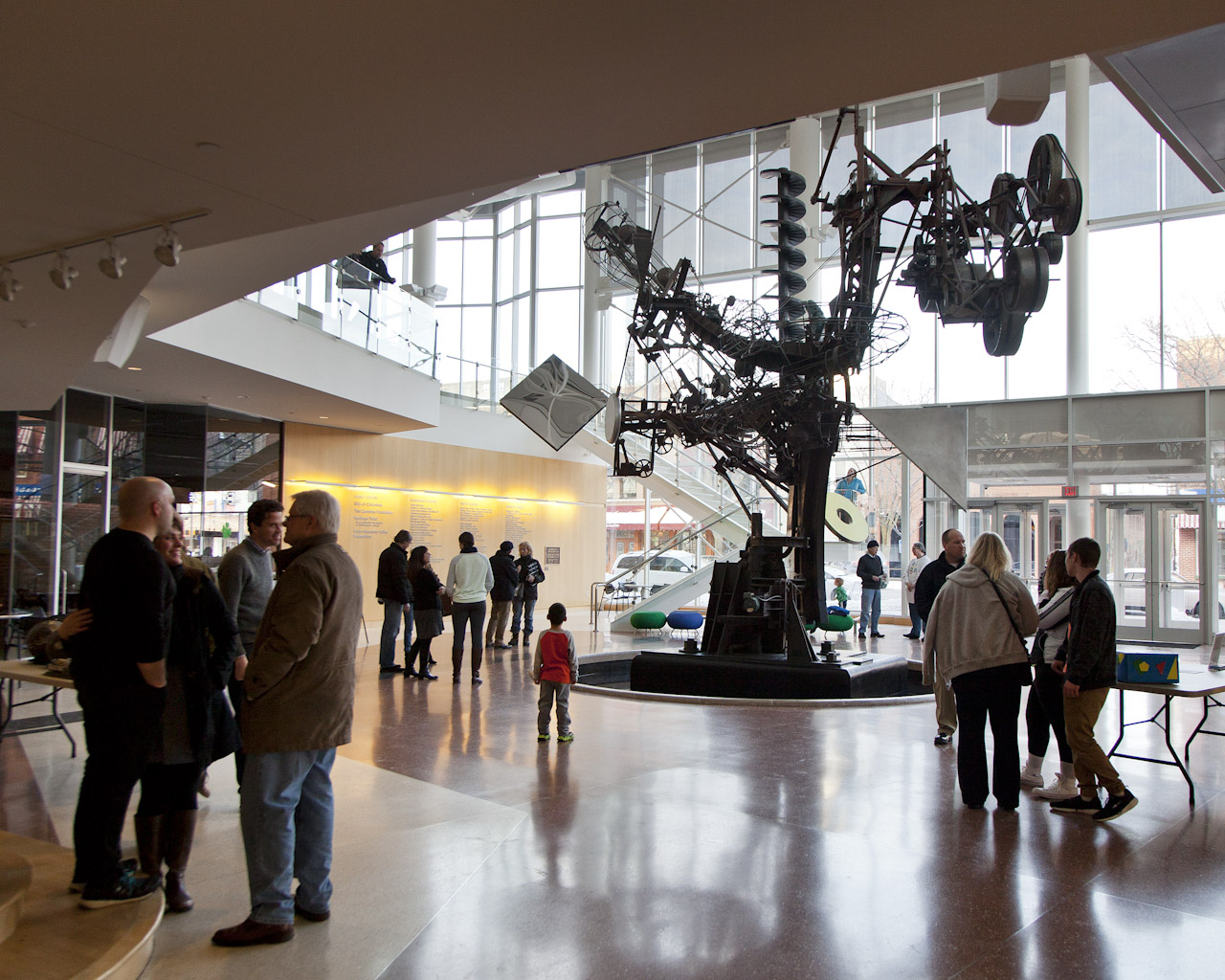
Tinguely, Chaos I, 1971–72; scrap metal components

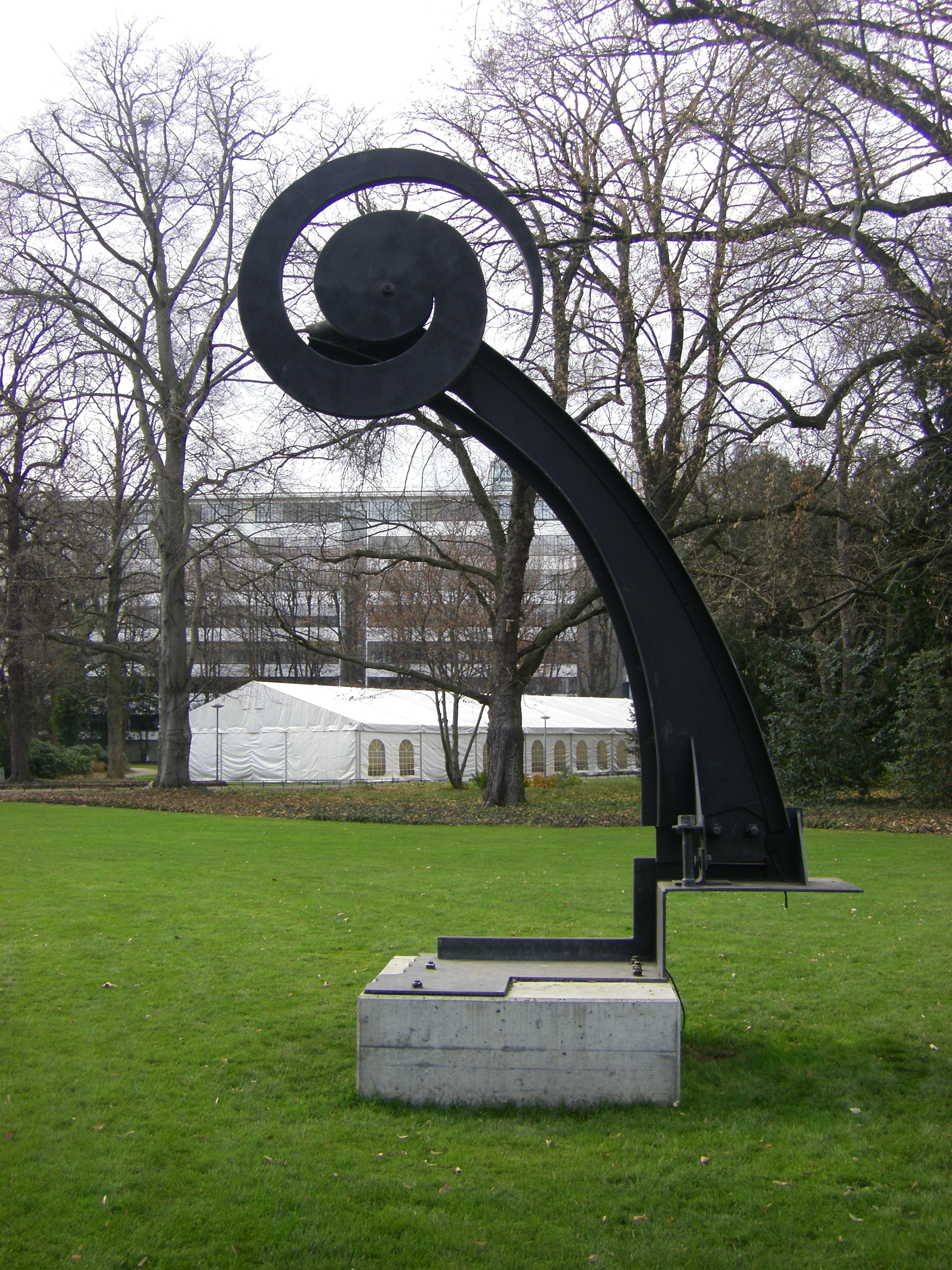
Tinguely, Large Spiral, 1971–73; steel-plates

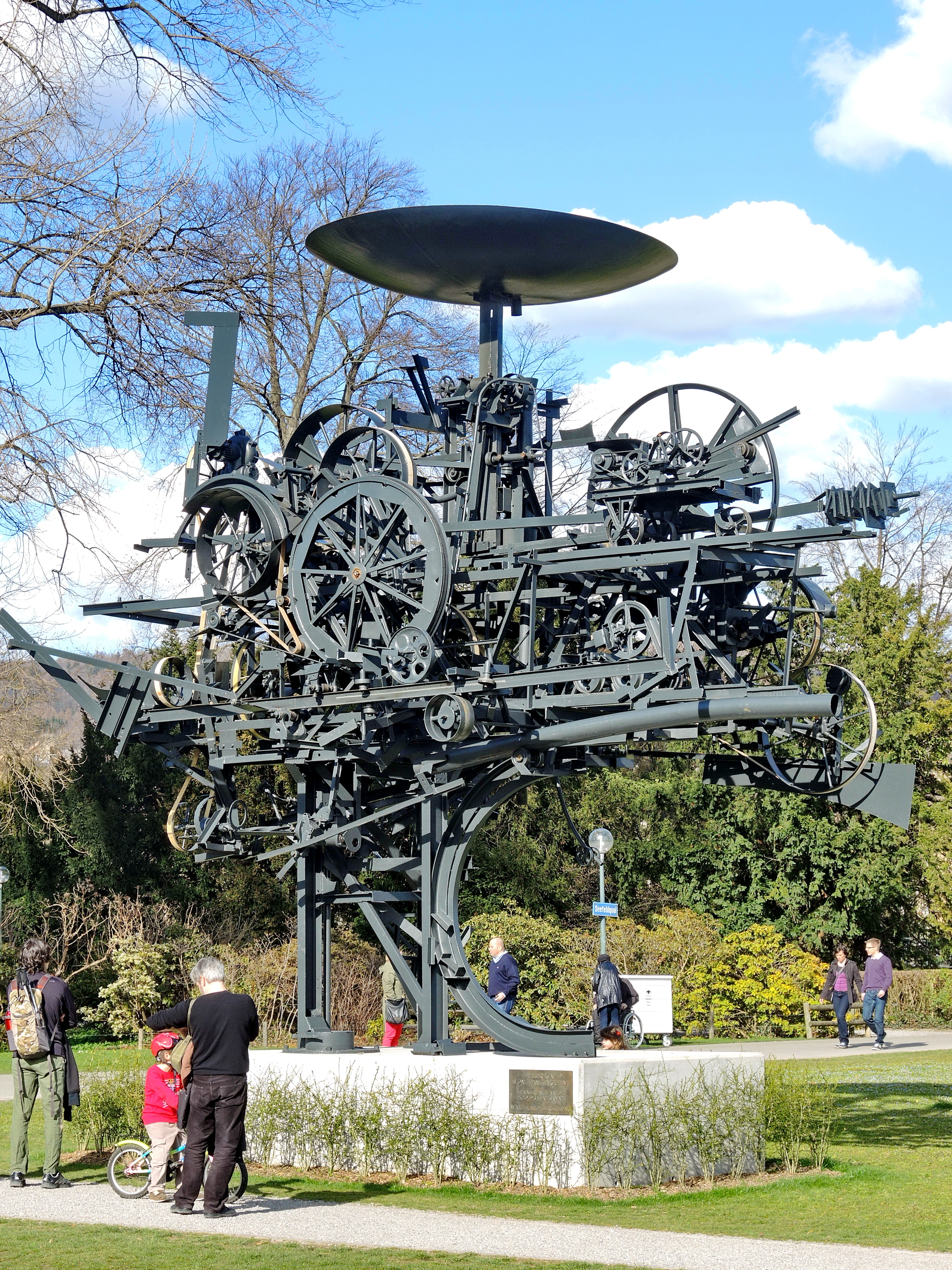
Tinguely, Heureka, 1972–73; scrap metal components

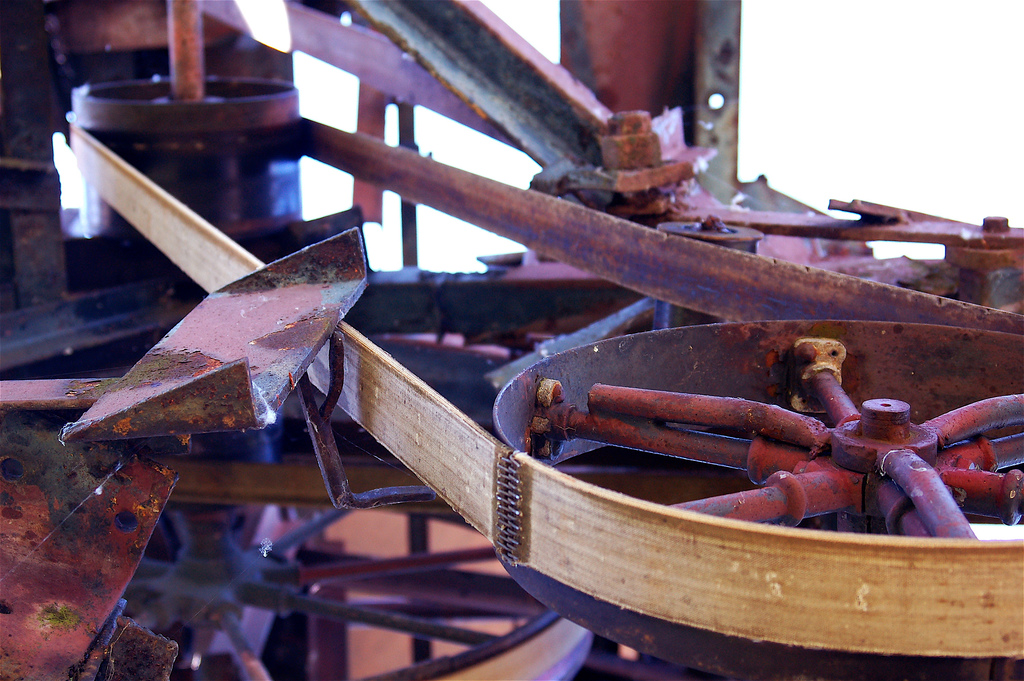
Tinguely, detail of Heureka, 1972–73; old components

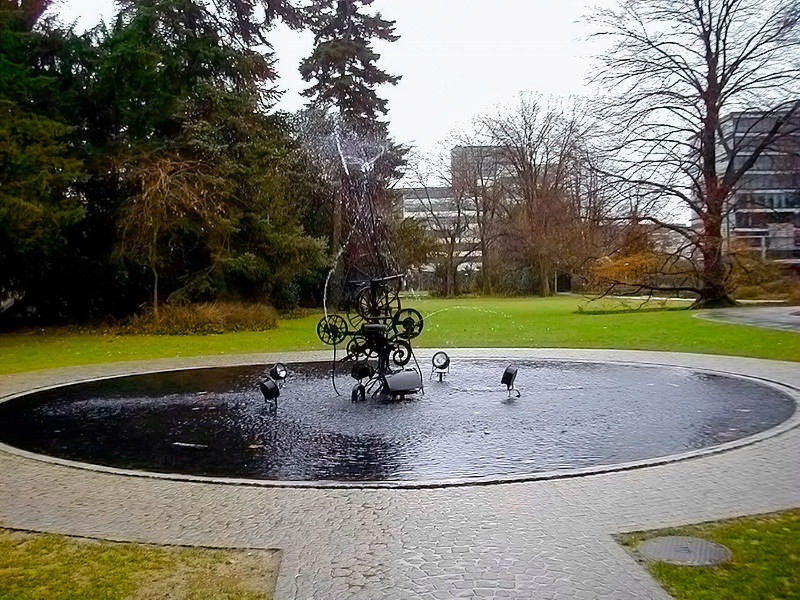
Tinguely, one piece of Carneval Fountain, 1977; location: in front of Museum Tinguely, Basel

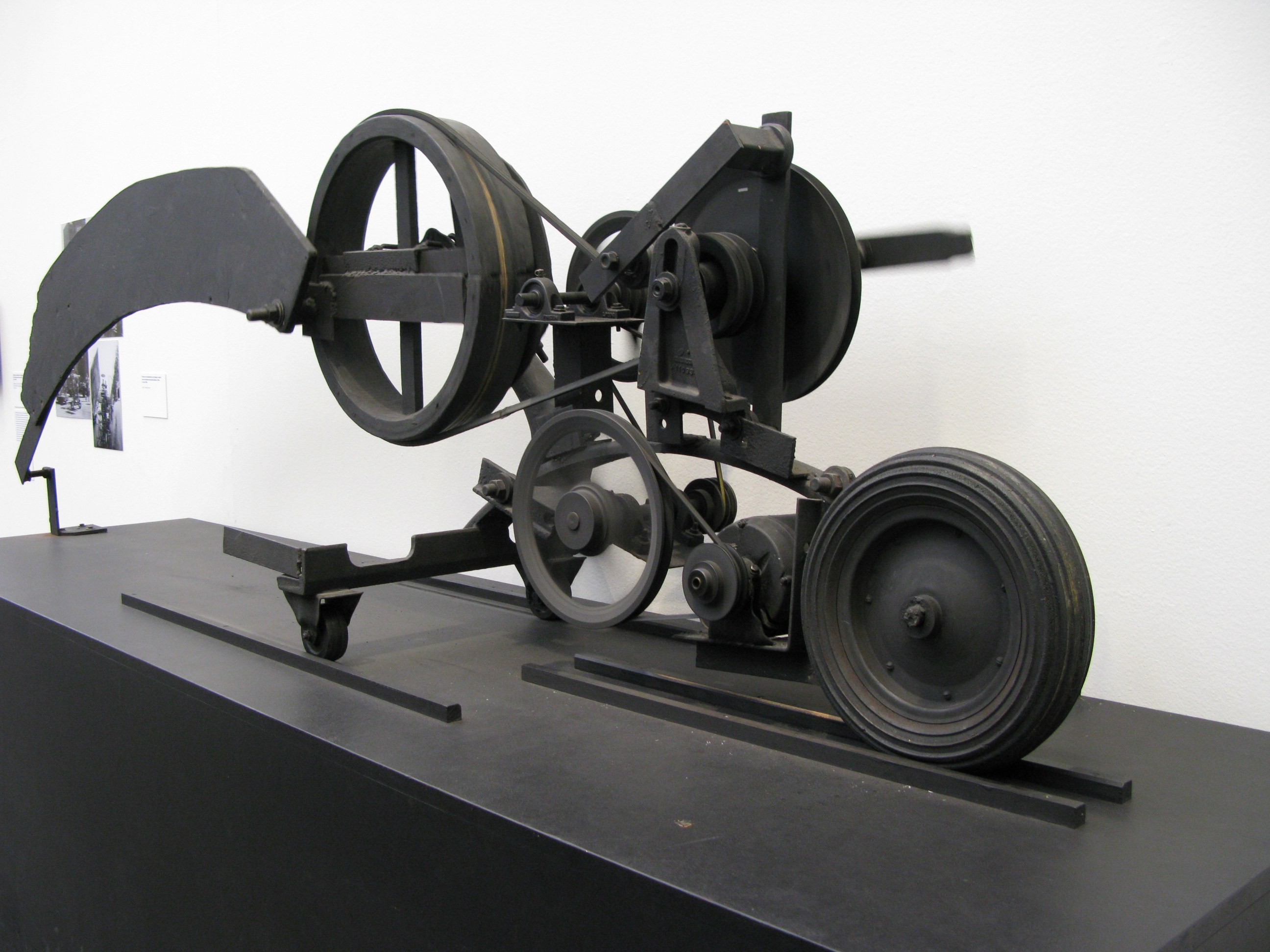
Tinguely, title unknown, late 1970s; scrap metal components

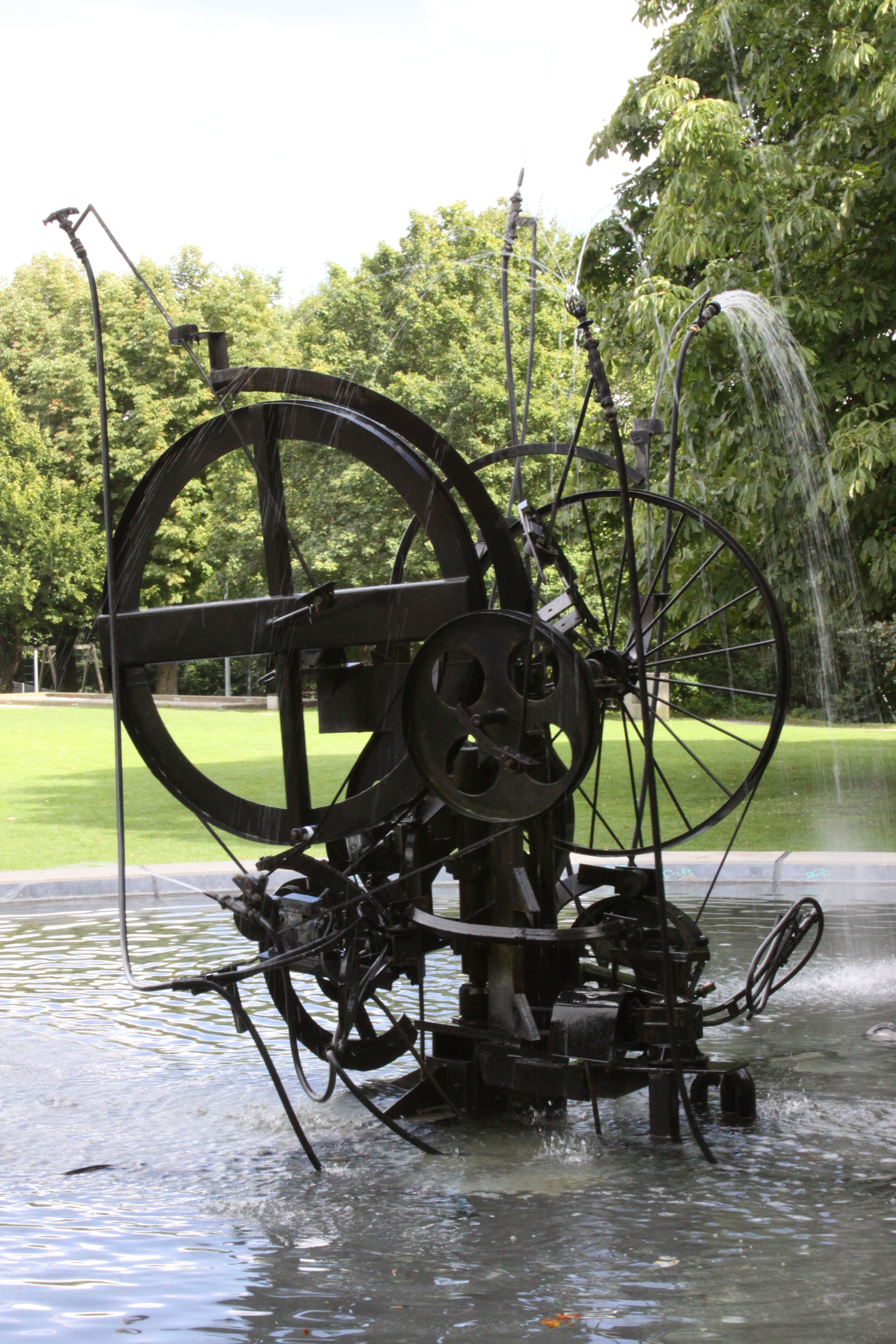
Tinguely, Jo Siffert Fountain, 1984; scrap metal components

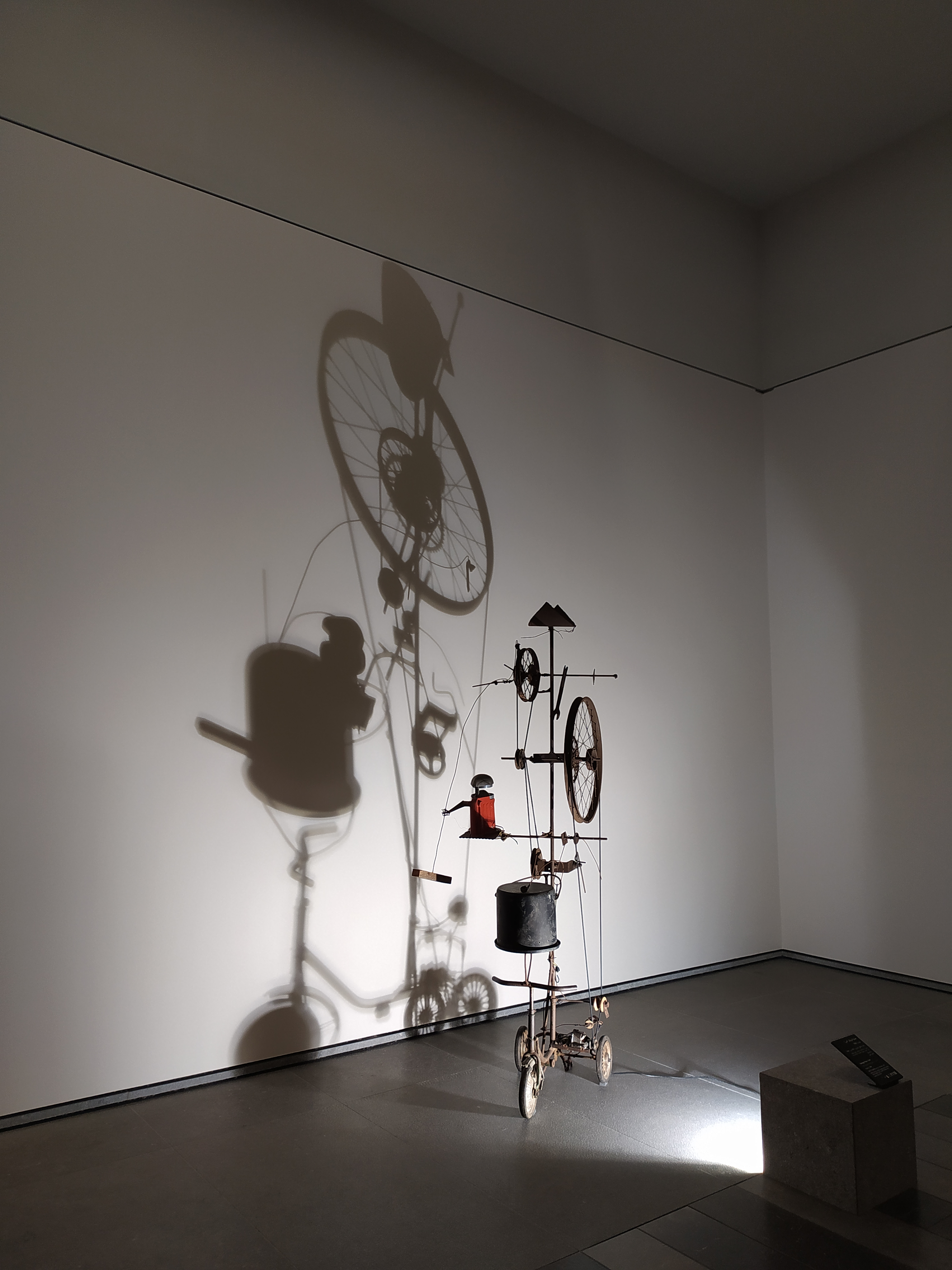
Tinguely, Press pour oranges in Louvre Abu Dhabi

== See also ==
- New Realism
- Useless machine
- Rube Goldberg
