= No. 19 Baseball Player =

1999 public artwork by Niki de Saint Phalle

#19 Baseball Player
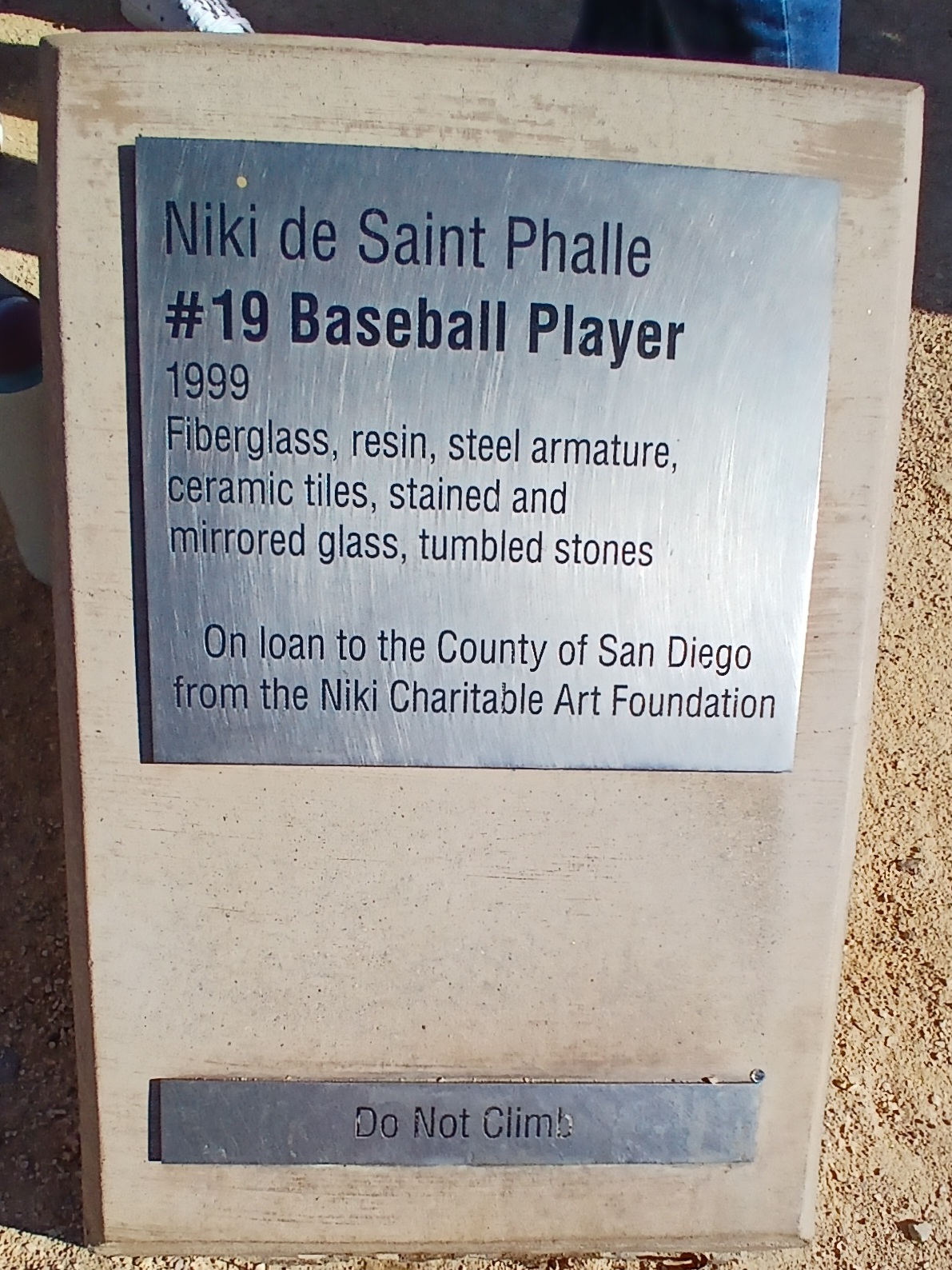
- Plaque located in San Diego
- Artist: Niki de Saint Phalle
- Year: 1999
- Type: Sculpture
- Medium: Fiberglass; Resin; Steel armature; Ceramic tile; stained and mirrored glass; Tumbled stone
- Subject: Baseball player
- Location: San Diego
- Owner: Niki Charitable Art Foundation
- Accession: Edition of 12

#19 Baseball Player is a public sculpture by French-American artist Niki de Saint Phalle, created in 1999.

== Description ==
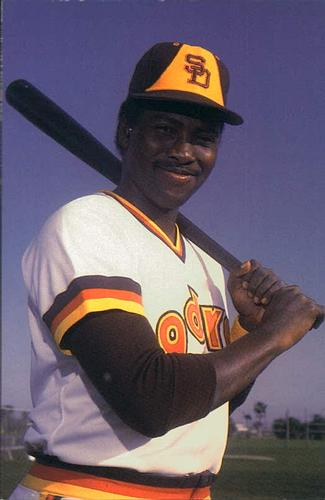
Tony Gwynn in 1983

The sculpture portrays a baseball batter in a stance. The figure is made of vibrant mosaic tiles and is part of the artist’s "Black Heroes" series, inspired by San Diego Padres right fielder Tony Gwynn.

== History ==
The sculpture was unveiled in May 2015, in a public exhibition in downtown San Diego, on loan from the Niki Charitable Art Foundation for a period of up to twelve years.

== Location ==
The sculpture is installed outdoors at Waterfront Park. At this location, a total of three sculptures by Niki de Saint Phalle can also be found: Large Seal (Element of Seals), 1999. Followed by "The Serpent Tree" (L'Arbre aux Serpents). The lastly adjacent to the playground is Cat, which is also a play structure.

=== New York Avenue Sculpture Project ===
#19 Baseball Player is one of the many sculptures being installed for the Project by the National Museum of Women in the Arts.

These works was to remain up for one year, before being returned to the artists foundation.

In 2012, #19 Baseball Player was exhibited along Park Avenue in New York City as part of an outdoor installation of sculptures. The exhibition, presented by The Sculpture Committee of The Fund for Park Avenue in collaboration with other city public art organizations.

The Park Avenue installation included several of de Saint Phalle’s large-scale mosaic sculptures, among them:

- Les Baigneurs (c. 1983)
- Les Trois Grâces (The Three Graces) (1999)
- #23 Basketball Player
- Nana on a Dolphin
- Arbre Serpents (Serpent Tree)
- Grand Step Totem (2001)
- Louis Armstrong (1999)

== Reviews ==
- Jacqueline Trescott (2010). "National Museum of Women in the Arts to turn D.C. corridor into sculpture alley". Style. The Washington Post. Retrieved 20 Oct 2025.
- Blake Gopnik (2010). "Sculptures add color to New York Avenue, but are they art?". Style. The Washington Post. Retrieved 20 Oct 2025.

== See also ==
- Alcazar Garden – Public gardens in San Diego
- List of public art in San Diego
- Mingei International Museum
- Nikigator – 2000 outdoor mosaic sculpture by Niki de Saint Phalle
- Queen Califia's Magical Circle – Sculpture garden in California, U.S.
- Statue of Tony Gwynn – Statue in San Diego, California, U.S.
- 'Sun God – Sculpture by Niki de Saint Phalle in San Diego, California, U.S.
