= The Three Graces =

The Three Graces may refer to:

- Charites, three goddesses in Greek mythology (Euphrosyne, Aglaia, and Thalia), in whom beauty was deified

== Arts and entertainment ==
=== Paintings ===
- The Three Graces (Cranach), a 1531 painting by Lucas Cranach the Elder
- Three Graces (Raphael), a 16th-century painting by Raphael
- The Three Graces (Rubens, Florence), a 1620–1623 painting by Peter Paul Rubens
- The Three Graces (Rubens, Madrid), a 1630–1635 painting by Rubens
- The Three Graces (Van Loo), a 1765 painting by Charles-André van Loo
- The Three Graces, a painting by Michael Parkes
- Three Women with Parasols, also known as The Three Graces, an 1880 painting by Marie Bracquemond
- Primavera (Botticelli), a 15th-century painting by Sandro Botticelli

=== Sculptures ===
- The Three Graces (Canova), a 19th-century neoclassical sculpture by Antonio Canova
- The Three Graces, an 18th-century fountain by Étienne d'Antoine in the Place de la Comédie, Montpellier, France
- The Three Graces (Indianapolis), a 19th- or 20th-century neoclassical sculpture by an unknown artist, located at the Indianapolis Museum of Art
- The Three Graces (Whitney), a 1931 fountain by Gertrude Vanderbilt Whitney at McGill University in Montreal
- Nymph (Central Figure for "The Three Graces"), a 1953 sculpture by Aristide Maillol
- Three Graces (Mack), a 1965 abstract sculpture by Heinz Mack, located at the Lynden Sculpture Garden
- Les Trois Grâces, a 1999 sculpture by Niki de Saint Phalle
- Three Graces, by Danish Bertel Thorvaldsen
- Three Graces Fountain located in Bordeaux's Place de la Bourse. (France)

=== Architecture ===
- The trio of landmark buildings located at Pier Head in Liverpool, England

=== Opera ===
- The Three Graces, a 1908 opera that opened at the Chicago Opera House and starred such performers as Trixie Friganza
- The Three Graces (Три грации), a 1988 Russian opera parody composed by Vladimir Tarnopolski

== See also ==
- Charis (disambiguation)
