= Les Trois Grâces =

Public artwork by Niki de Saint Phalle

- The Three Graces (English)
- Artist: Niki de Saint Phalle
- Year: 1999
- Type: Fiberglass and mosaic
- Location: National Museum of Women in the Arts; Washington, DC, United States; 38°54′1.5″N 77°1′44.44″W
- Owner: Niki Charitable Art Foundation

Les Trois Grâces is a set of three public artworks by French-American sculptor Niki de Saint Phalle. The Three Graces were a part of the National Museum of Women in the Arts New York Avenue Sculpture Project. It was created in 1999. It is located in Washington, DC, United States.

== Description ==
In the classic style of Niki de Saint Phalle's work, Les Trois Grâces are three large sculptures of voluptuous women (a creation that de Saint Phalle calls a 'Nana') who appear to be dancing. Made of fiberglass, one Nana is covered in white, one yellow and the other is black mosaic tiles, ranging in heights of 12 to 15 feet (3.7 to 4.6 m). They all wear elaborate bathing suits in designs such as hearts, fish, and instruments, in multiple color schemes. A whimsical set of sculptures, the three figures have their arms raised as if ballet dancing; each has one foot on the ground and another raised up. They are Saint Phalle's own version of The Three Graces.

Saint Phalle said that the works represented unity among the races.

== New York Avenue Sculpture Project ==
Les Trois Grâces were the first of many sculptures being installed for the Project by the National Museum of Women in the Arts. By 2015 a selection of sculptures was to be installed along New York Avenue from 13th Street to 9th Street, in the heart of Mount Vernon Square. The museum's efforts were in part to bring "character" to an area where "there is a lot of good stuff going on", due to revitalization programs in the neighborhood. Saint Phalle's works, four in total, were the first in a series of installations. The installation of de Saint Phalle's iconic pop art works was intended to contrast with the traditional sculpture that graces the streets and squares of Washington.

The entire selection of de Saint Phalle's works was removed during the winter for conservation purposes, intended to reappear in the Spring. They were to remain up for one year, before being returned to the artist's foundation.

== Dedication ==
The works arrived and were installed in mid-April 2010 by way of flat-bed semi-truck. The pieces were removed from their custom crates, handled and installed by hand.

Les Trois Grâces, along with the other de Saint Phalle sculptures in the project, were dedicated at 1:30 pm on April 28, 2010., with an evening reception within the museum. Jill Biden, Eleanor Holmes Norton, Jack Evans, National Museum of Women in the Arts founder Wilhelmina Holladay and Saint Phalle's granddaughter Bloum Cardenas, along with members of the DC Business Improvement District, District of Columbia Department of Transportation, DC Office of the Planning, and other guests attended the ribbon cutting.

== Critical reception ==
The Washington Post's Jacqueline Trescott described Les Trois Grâces as a "splash of pop art, as exaggerated as Las Vegas showgirls". Fellow Post writer and art critic Blake Gopnik described the pieces as being "less weighty than what we hope to find inside our museums", characterizing them as plop art.

== See also ==
- List of public art in Washington, D.C., Ward 2
- Nana on a Dolphin – 1998 public artwork by Niki de Saint Phalle, another work in the New York Avenue Sculpture Project
- #23 Basketball Player – Sculpture in Washington, D.C., US, another work in the New York Avenue Sculpture Project
