= Arbre Serpents =

1999 sculpture by Niki de Saint Phalle

Abre Serpents
- Serpent Tree (English)
- Artist: Niki de Saint Phalle
- Year: 1999
- Type: fiberglass, mosaic
- Location: National Museum of Women in the Arts, Washington, D.C., US; 38.900544°N 77.028628°W
- Owner: Niki Charitable Art Foundation

Arbre Serpents (English: Serpent Tree) is a large, colorful outdoor sculpture by French-American artist Niki de Saint Phalle.

== Description ==
Created in 1988, the sculpture consists of brightly colored serpents intertwined around a central trunk-like form. It was created from stained glass and mirrors.

Created in 1999, it showed at the Missouri Botanical Garden. It is part of the National Museum of Women in the Arts, New York Avenue Sculpture Project.

== History ==
In 1987, Niki de Saint Phalle created a mosaic fountain version of the work, titled Arbre de Vie – Fontaine (Tree of Life, Fountain of Serpents). The piece was later displayed at the Grand Palais in Paris during an exhibition that opened on Thursday, February 26, 2015.

Following its presentation in Paris, the exhibition traveled to the Guggenheim Bilbao in Spain, where it was shown from February 27 to June 11, 2015. Other examples of Saint Phalle's public artworks can be found throughout Paris. Such as, Arbre de Vie – Fontaine and the artist's earlier collaboration on the Stravinsky Fountain near the Centre Pompidou.

In May 2015, the sculpture was installed outdoors at Waterfront Park. In a public exhibition in downtown San Diego, on loan from the Niki Charitable Art Foundation for a period of up to twelve years. At this location, three other Saint Phalle sculptures can also be found: Large Seal (Element of Seals), #19 Baseball Player, and Cat, which is also a play structure.

== Reviews ==
- Jacqueline Trescott (2010). "National Museum of Women in the Arts to turn D.C. corridor into sculpture alley". Style. The Washington Post. Retrieved 8 Feb 2011.
- Blake Gopnik (2010). "Sculptures add color to New York Avenue, but are they art?". Style. The Washington Post. Retrieved 9 Feb 2011.
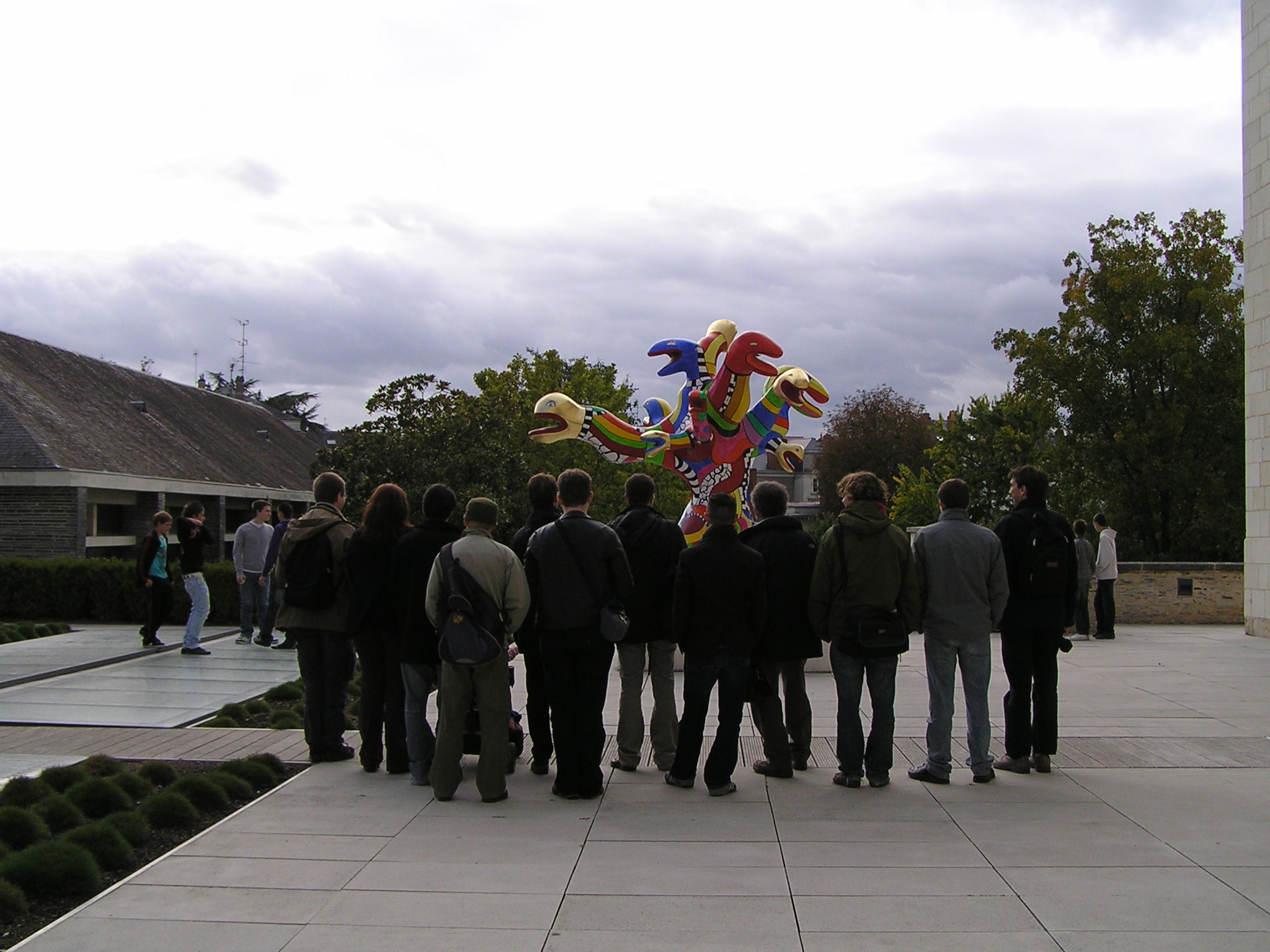

Colorful art statues, New York Ave., NW, in downtown Washington, D.C

== See also ==
- List of public art in Washington, D.C., Ward 2
- Queen Califia's Magical Circle – Sculpture garden in California, U.S.
