= Nikigator =

2000 outdoor mosaic sculpture by Niki de Saint Phalle

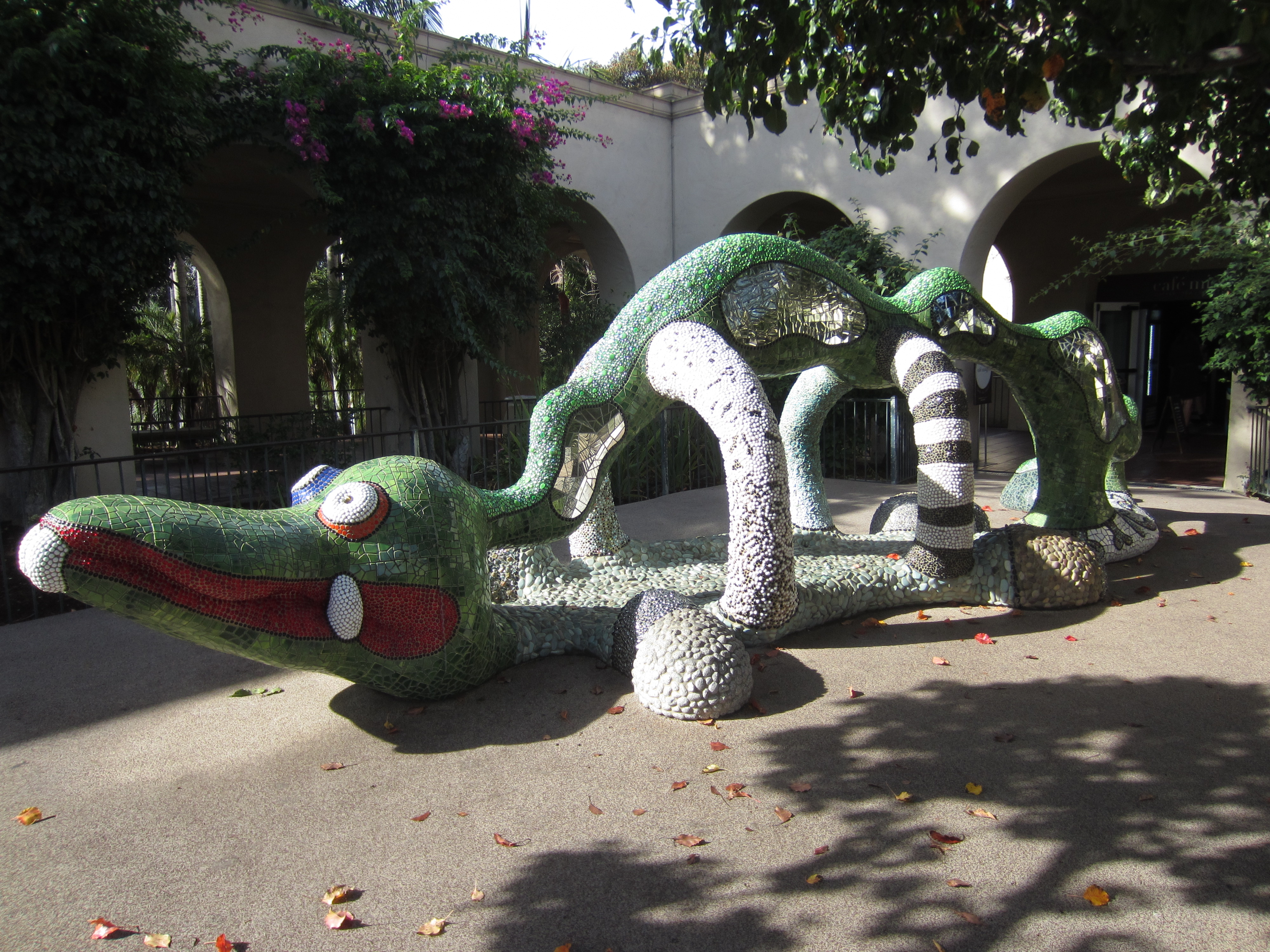
- Artist: Niki de Saint Phalle
- Year: 2000
- Medium: Polyurethane foam, resin, tumbled stones, ceramics
- Subject: Alligator
- Location: Mingei International Museum, San Diego
- Coordinates: 32°43′52″N 117°9′4″W
- Website: mingei.org

Nikigator is a permanent public artwork by Franco‑American sculptor Niki de Saint Phalle, installed at the entrance of the Mingei International Museum in San Diego, California. Created in 2000, the more than 5,000-pound mosaic sculpture depicts a hollow alligator covered in vibrant tiles, mirrored glass, and colorful stones.

== Description ==
Standing several feet high and wide, Nikigator is composed of a steel armature coated with polyurethane foam and resin. Its mosaic surface comprises tumbled stones sourced internationally, including marbles from Guadalajara and turquoise from the U.S.

Saint Phalle designed the piece to be tactile and accessible to viewers, particularly children, elementally combining whimsy and scale intended for physical play.

It is in Balboa Park, near the May S. Marcy Sculpture Garden at the San Diego Museum of Art.

== Commissioning and history ==
Originally commissioned after the success of a mosaic alligator sent to Jerusalem Biblical Zoo’s Noah’s Ark project, Nikigator served as a homegrown companion piece for the Mingei. The museum’s founder, Martha Longenecker, was closely connected to the artist and championed this piece as a permanent outdoor installation.

== Conservation and care ==
Due to its outdoor installation and public interaction, Nikigator requires ongoing care. While detailed maintenance logs are managed by the Mingei and its conservators, this effort mirrors how Saint Phalle's other San Diego installations—like Queen Califia's Magical Circle—are preserved.

The 5,000-pound sculpture was moved to Liberty Station in July 2019 for safety while the Mingei Museum underwent renovation. It returned by crane after the museum reopened to the public.

== Reception ==
Locally, Nikigator has been celebrated as a playful and engaging work of public art, with visitors drawn to its vivid coloration and tactile appeal. Mingei officials describe it as a "beacon" reestablished following its return in 2021.

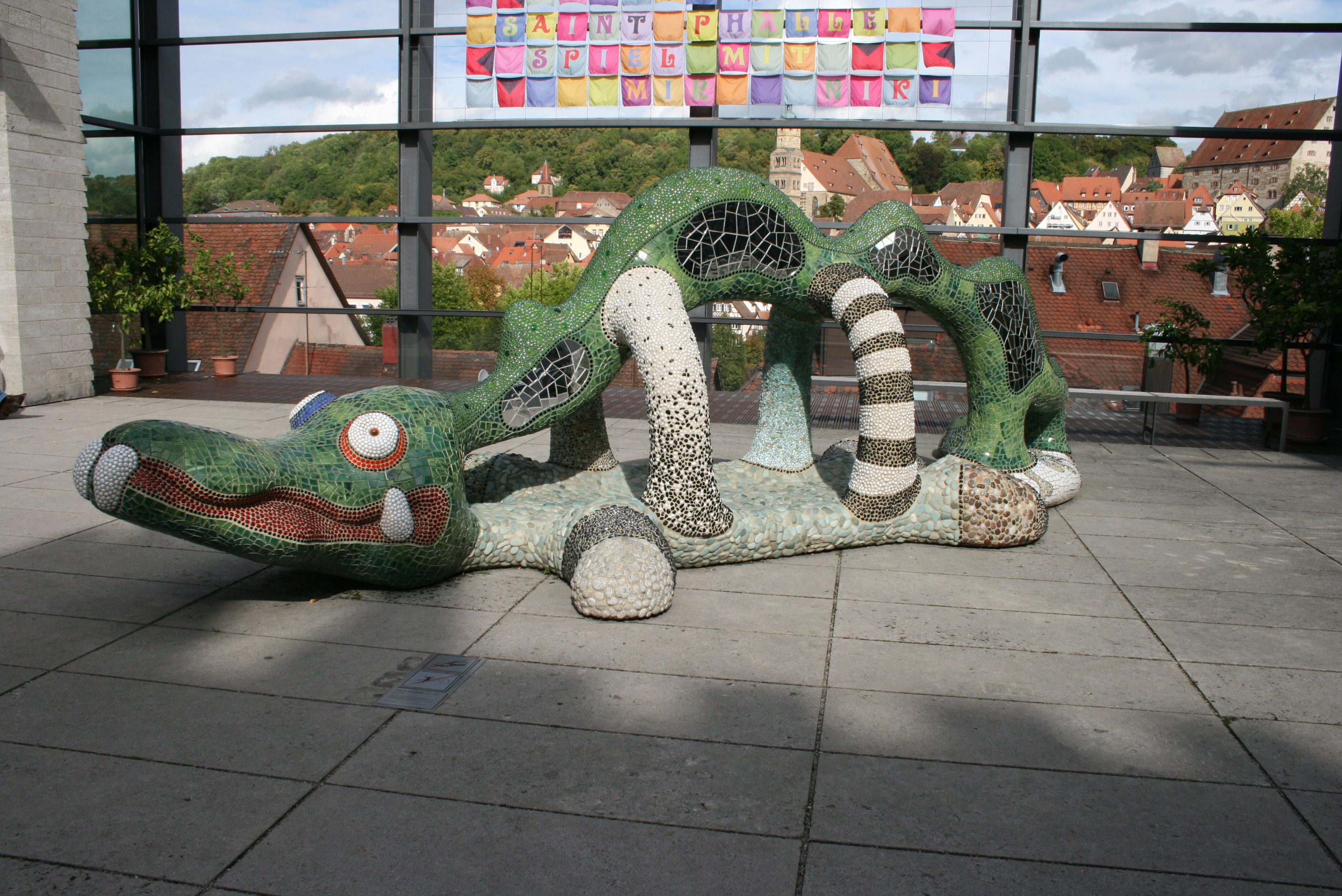
In front of the Kunsthalle Würth in Schwäbisch-Hall (2011)

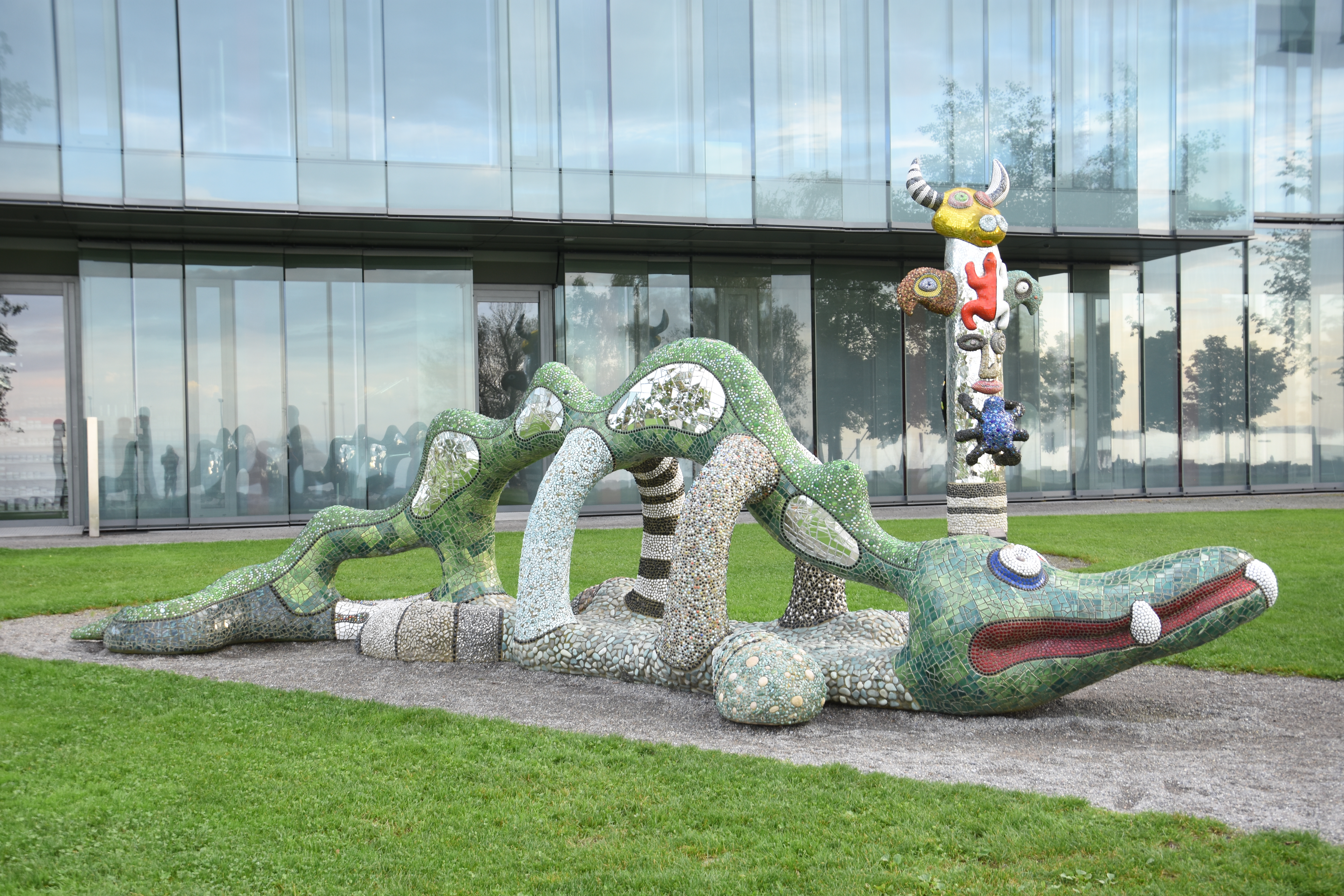
Photographed at the Kunsthalle Würth in Schwäbisch Hall, Germany. The sculpture is part of the Forum Würth collection, based in Rorschach, Switzerland.

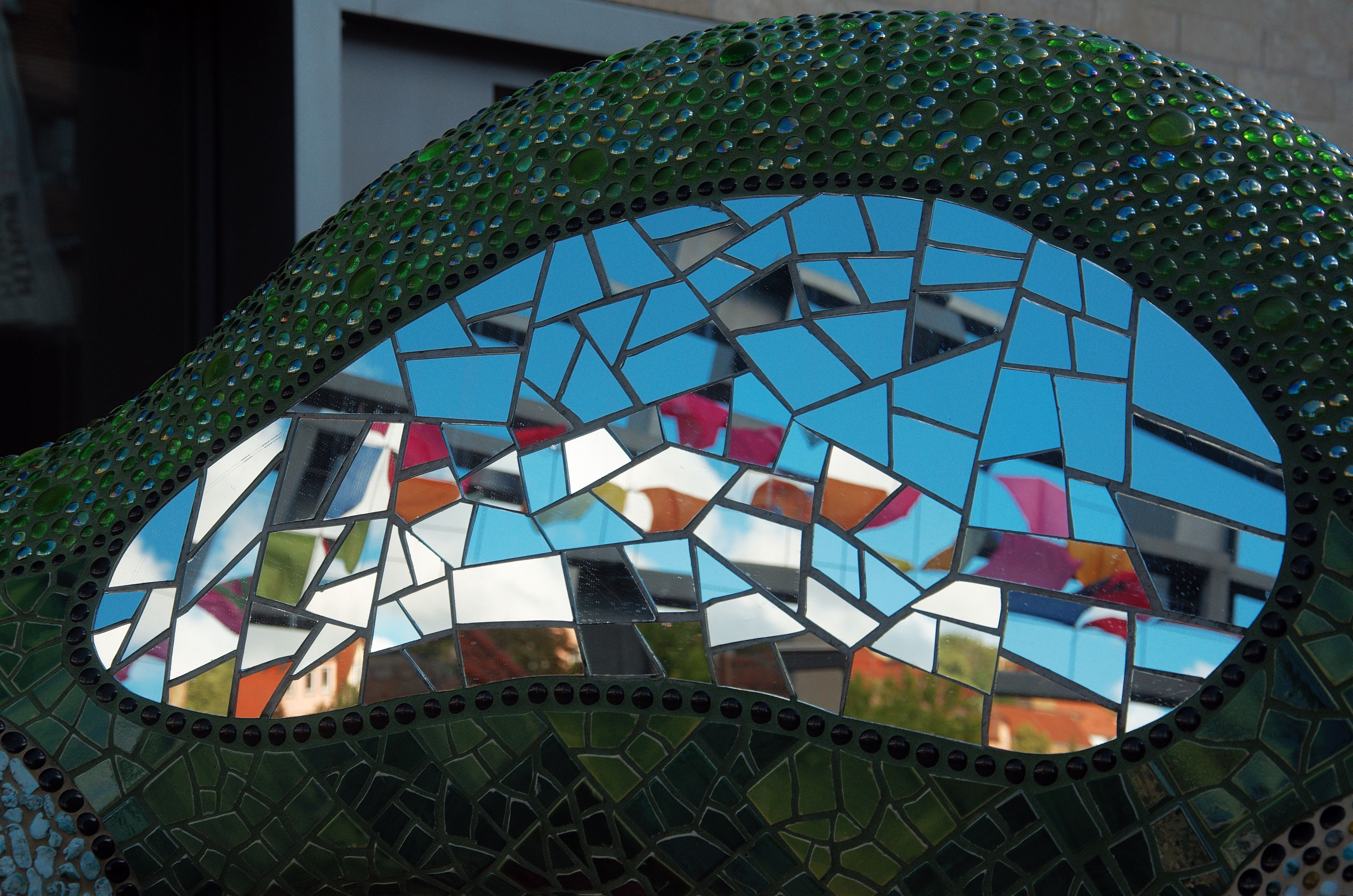

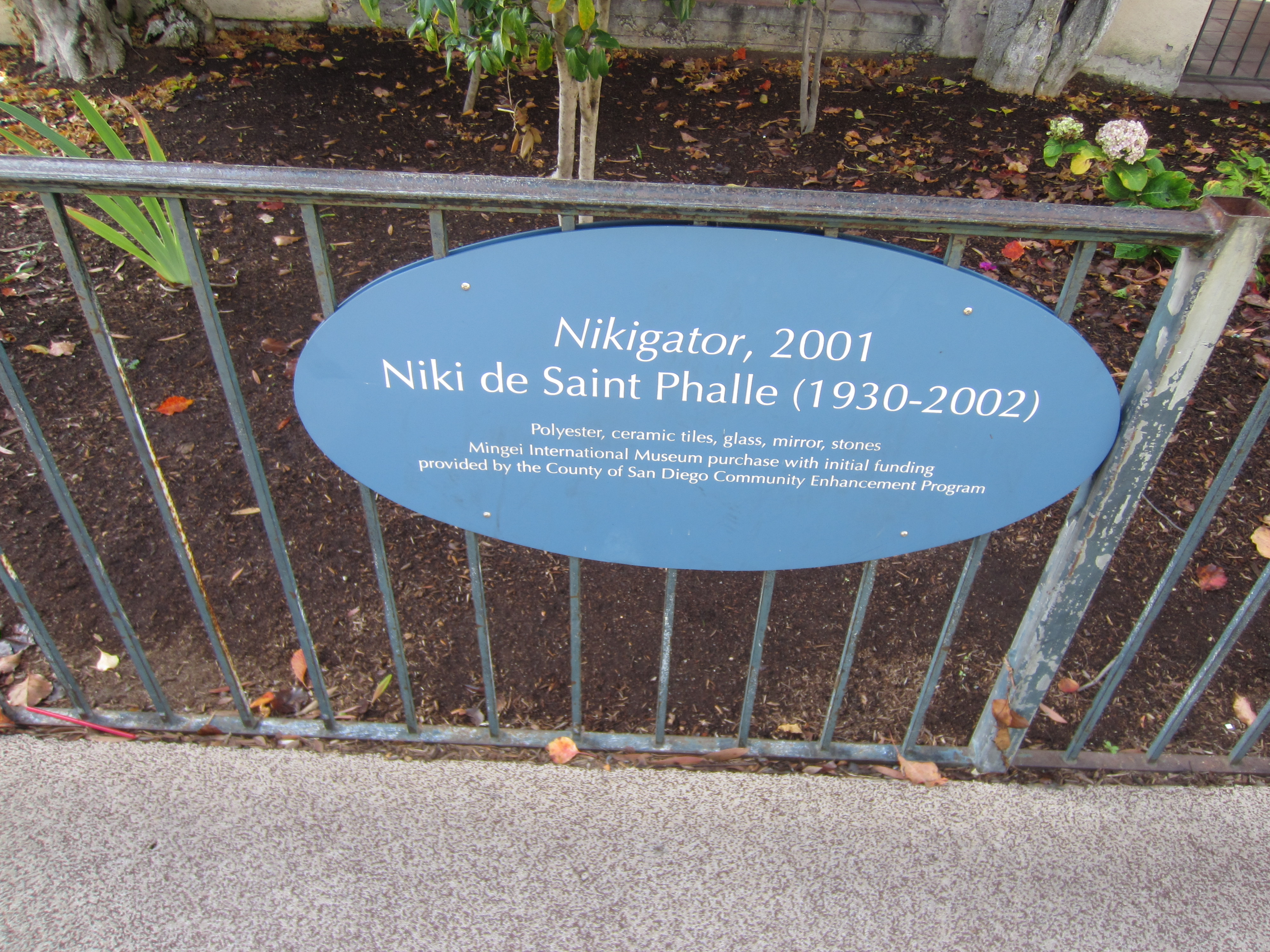
San Diego Balboa Park plaque

== See also ==
- List of public art in San Diego
- Sun God (statue) – Sculpture by Niki de Saint Phalle in San Diego, California, U.S.
- #19 Baseball Player – 1999 public artwork by Niki de Saint Phalle
