= Mule Hill =

Historical Landmark in San Diego, California, United States

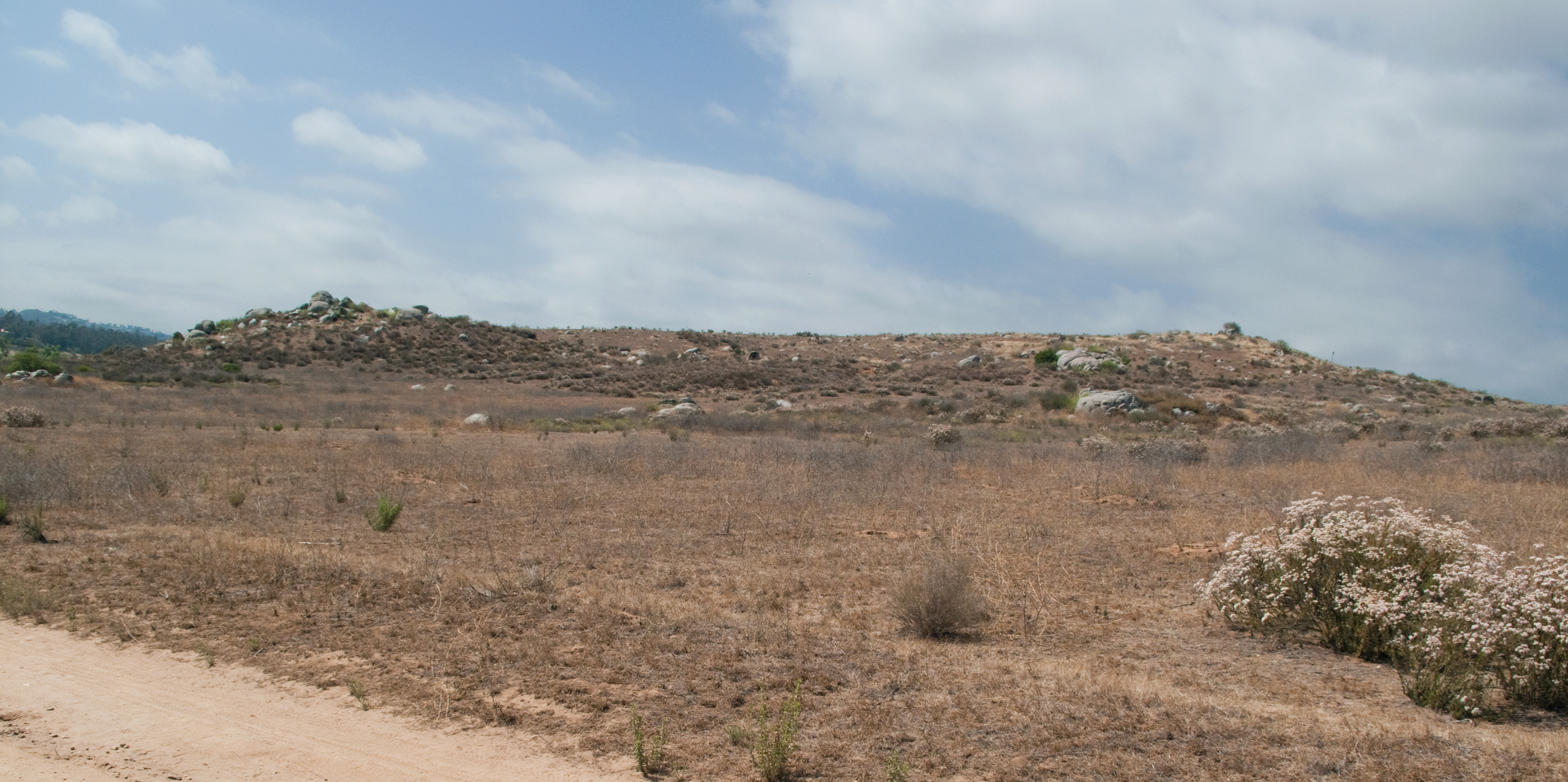
- Mule Hill

- Location within California Location within the United States
- 33.0551°N 117.0695°W
- Location: San Pasqual Valley, San Diego

History
- Built: December 7, 1846

California Historical Landmark
- Designated: November 2, 1949
- Reference no.: 452

Mule Hill is a historical site in San Pasqual Valley, San Diego, California. Mule Hill site is a California Historical Landmark No. 452, listed on November 2, 1949. The Mule Hill, a low hill, was the site of a battle during the Mexican–American War on December 7, 1846. The Mule Hill battle took place the day after the Battle of San Pasqual. The battle of San Pasqual took place five miles east of Mule Hill. The Mexican Californios attacked General Stephen Kearny's troops on Mule Hill. Kearny and his troops were on the way to San Diego when they were again attacked. The Kearny troops counterattacked, took, and held the hill until December 11. Kearny and his troops ran short of food and were forced to eat mule meat, the hill's namesake. Captain Turner was the one who ordered Lieutenant William H. Emory and a squad of dragoons to attack the Californios lancers, Leonardo Cota's men, at Mule Hill, killing five Californios lancers.

A historical marker was placed in 1950 on the northern side of Pomerado Road near Mule Hill by the California Centennial Commission. That location is now just before the north-bound on-ramp of Interstate 15.

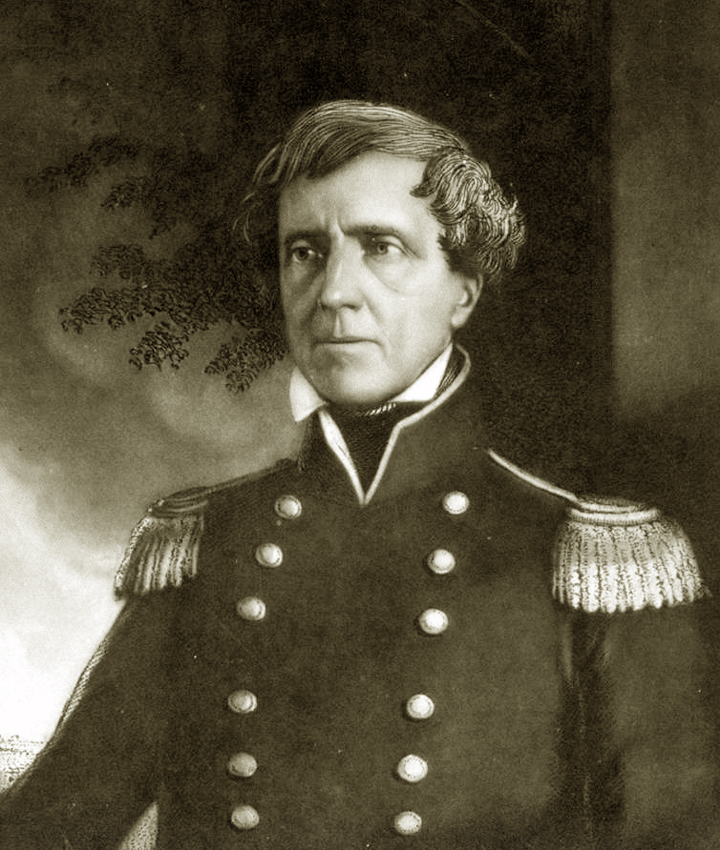
Stephen W. Kearny(1794–1848)

== See also ==
- California Historical Landmarks in San Diego County
- Kit Carson Park
- Casa de Carrillo House
- Casa de Estudillo
- Casa de Cota
