= Nana on a Dolphin =

1998 public artwork by Niki de Saint Phalle

- Artist: Niki de Saint Phalle
- Year: 1998
- Type: fiberglass and mosaic
- Location: National Museum of Women in the Arts; Washington, D.C., United States; 38°54′1.18″N 77°1′45.33″W
- Owner: Niki Charitable Art Foundation

Nana on a Dolphin is a public artwork by French sculptor Niki de Saint Phalle. Nana on a Dolphin is part of the National Museum of Women in the Arts New York Avenue Sculpture Project and has also been on display at the home of Nicole Salinger in Provence, France.

== Description ==
In the style of de Saint Phalle's work, Nana on a Dolphin depicts one of her signature Nanas standing on the back of a brilliantly colored dolphin. The dolphin is covered in bright colored mosaic tiles with a slight grin to its lip line. Just in front of the dolphin's top fin stands Nana, balanced on her left foot with her right foot kicked behind her. Her faceless head and body are orange and she wears a silver bathing suit with de Saint Phalle's signature heart on the proper left breast and black tile on the proper right. In her right hand she holds a red ball and her left hand is thrown behind her back. The statue stands on a steel pole which is bolted into a concrete block.

== New York Avenue Sculpture Project ==
Nana on a Dolphin is one of the many sculptures being installed for the Project by the National Museum of Women in the Arts. By 2015 a selection of sculptures will be installed along New York Avenue from 13th Street to 9th Street, in the heart of Mount Vernon Square. The museums efforts are in part to bring "character" to an area where "there is a lot of good stuff going on," due to revitalization programs in the neighborhood. de Saint Phalle's works, four in total, are the first in a series of installations. The museums installation of de Saint Phalle's iconic pop art works are meant to be contrasting to the traditional sculpture that graces the streets and squares of Washington.

These works will remain up for one year, before being returned to the artists foundation.

== Installation ==
The artwork was installed mid-April 2010, being delivered to its placement location by way of a flat-bed semi-truck in crates. Each piece was removed and placed by way of a crane.

== Dedication ==
Nana on a Dolphin, along with the other de Saint Phalle sculptures in the project, were dedicated at 1:30 p.m. on April 28, 2010., with an evening reception within the museum. Jill Biden, Eleanor Holmes Norton, Jack Evans, National Museum of Women in the Arts founder Wilhelmina Holladay and de Saint Phalle's granddaughter Bloum Cardenas, along with members of the D.C. BID, District of Columbia Department of Transportation, D.C. Office of the Planning, among others, attended the ribbon cutting.

== Conservation ==
The entire selection of de Saint Phalle's works are removed during the winter for conservation purposes, only to reappear in the Spring.

== Reception ==
Washington Post art critic Blake Gopnik stated that the pieces are "less weighty than what we hope to find inside our museums." Glopnik believed the pieces were nothing like the Picasso or van Gogh works that are often expected. "They are probably best enjoyed at a nice downtown clip of 15 or 20 mph."

Gopnik also touches on the idea of the works being from a woman-based museum: "Wouldn't you imagine that when a women's museum makes its most public statement yet, it would avoid any hint of decor or fluff?" Describing de Saint Phalle's works as "scary and aggressive" versus what others often describe as jubilant and goofy. Overall, he describes the works as plop art.

== Gallery ==
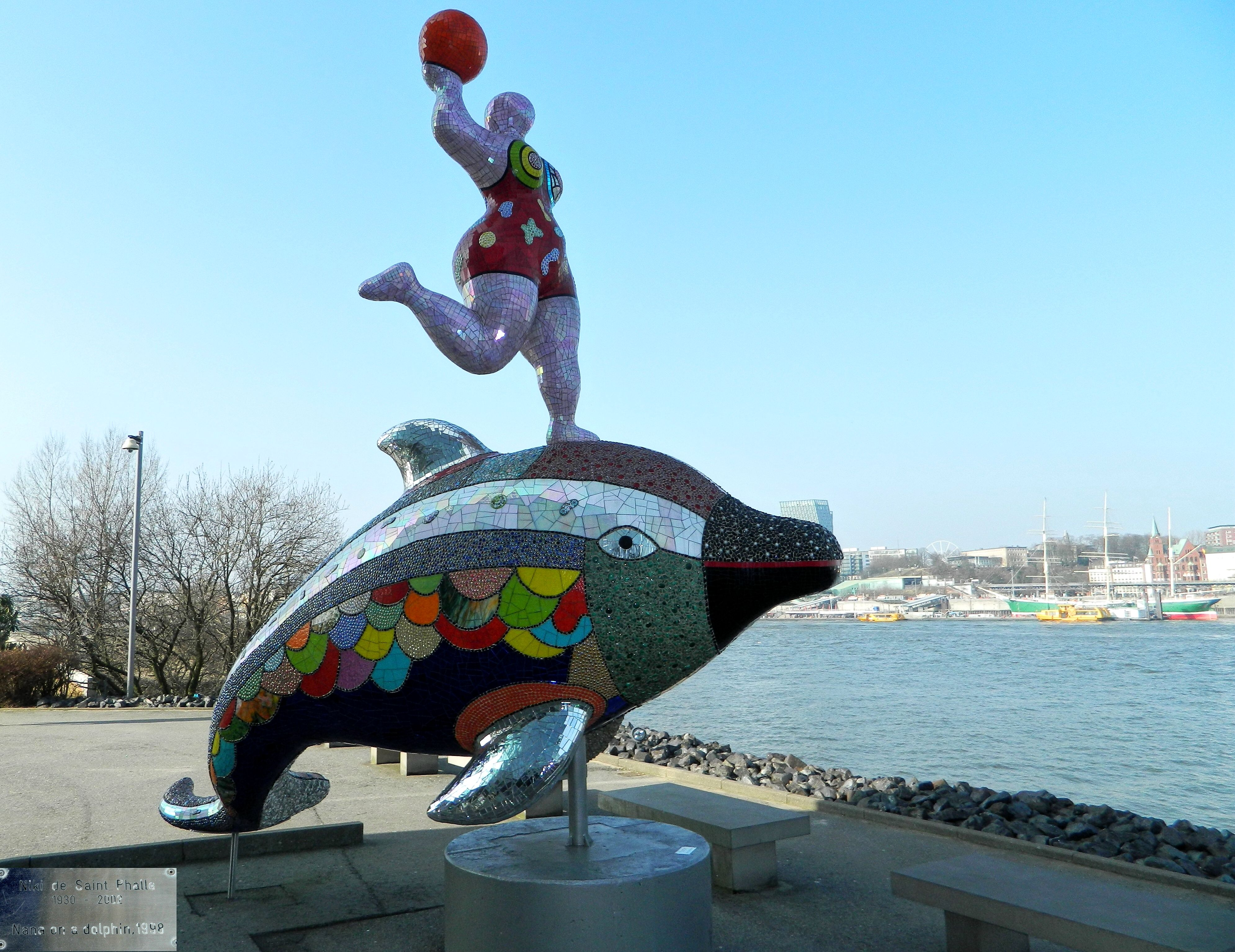
Taken on 15 March 2012 at Hamburg

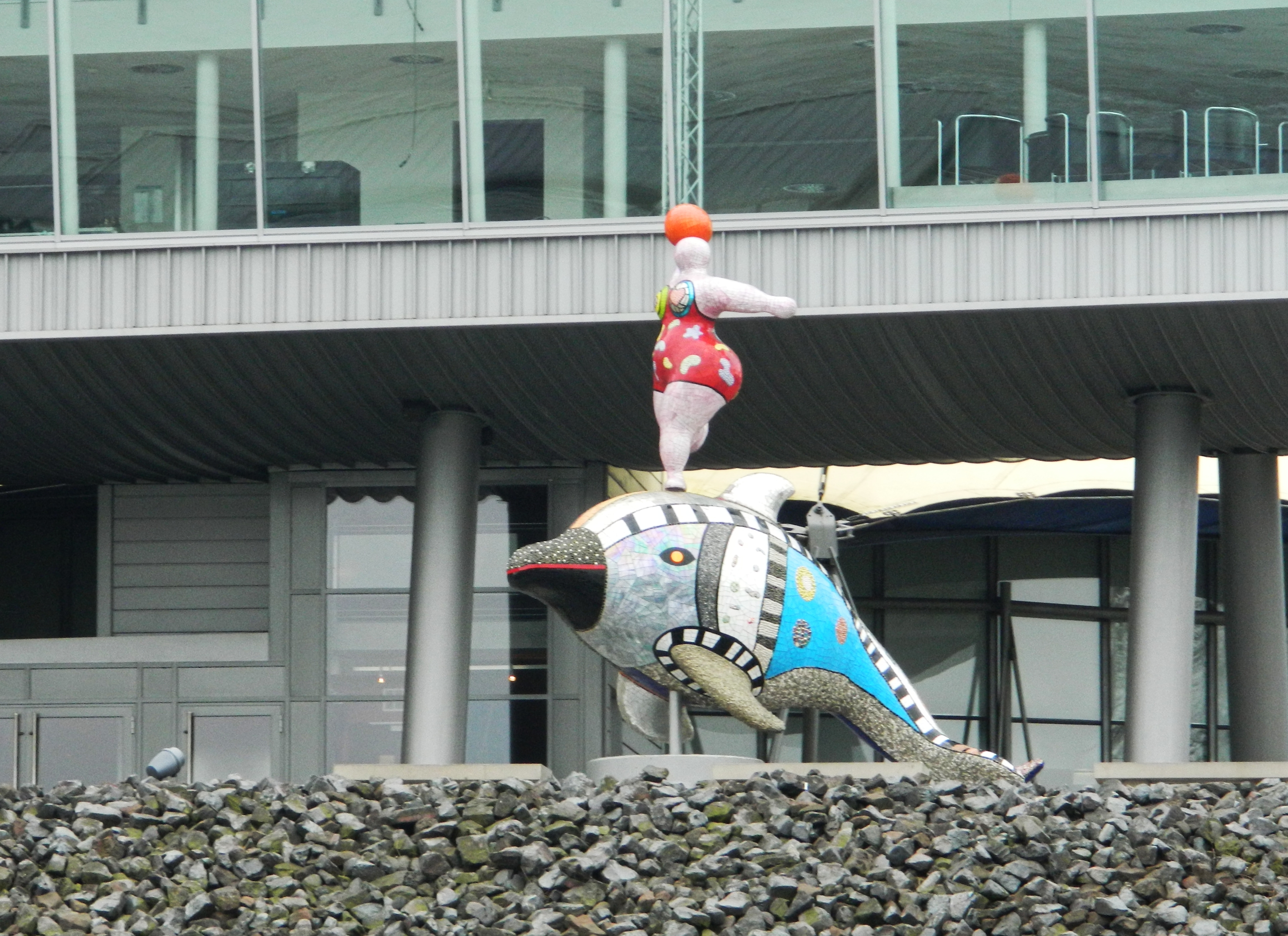
Nana on a Dolphin 1998, Taken on 7 March 2012 at Hamburg

Colorful art statues, New York Ave., NW, in downtown Washington, D.C

== See also ==
- Les Trois Grâces – Public artwork by Niki de Saint Phalle
- List of public art in Washington, D.C., Ward 2
