= Queen Califia's Magical Circle =

Sculpture garden in California, U.S.

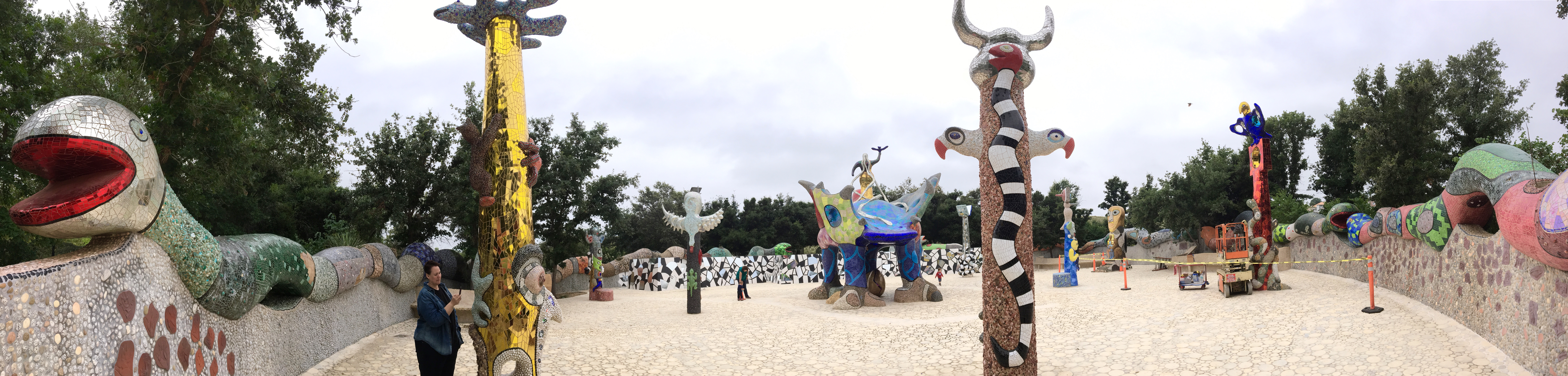
- Artist: Niki de Saint Phalle
- Year: 2003
- Medium: Sculpture garden, primarily in fiberglass and mosaic
- Dimensions: 7.3 m (24 ft); 37 m diameter (120 ft)
- Location: Kit Carson Park, Escondido, California, U.S.
- 33°4′48″N 117°3′46″W
- Website: www.escondido.gov/facilities/facility/details/nikidesaintphallesqueencalifiasmagicalcircle-19

External images
- Queen Califia on her Eagle Throne
- Golden Eye
- Serpent Wall

Queen Califia's Magical Circle is an outdoor sculpture garden in Escondido, California. It is named in honor of the legendary Queen Califia of California.

Opened posthumously in 2003, it is one of the last works of Franco-American artist Niki de Saint Phalle.

== Description ==
The garden is named after Califia, the warrior queen of the Island of California, and was inspired by California's rich history and culture. It includes a circular enclosure, maze entryway paved with mosaic tiles, ten large sculptures, and native trees and shrubs planted both inside the plaza and around the outer wall. Three long benches faced with travertine marble and river rocks, designed by Pierre Marie LeJeune, are provided for visitor comfort.

The 120-foot diameter enclosed garden is part of a 12-acre (4.9 ha) habitat in Kit Carson Park's Iris Sankey Arboretum, and was opened to the public on October 26, 2003. The sculpture garden is only open a few days each week, based on the availability of docents, and is closed during rainy weather and for 24–48 hours afterwards.

Queen Califia’s Magical Circle is known as the only American sculpture garden created by Niki de Saint Phalle, and was her last major international project before her death in 2002. The installation showcases the artist's signature designs such as voluptuous female figures, hybrid creatures, and mythical symbols that are covered in vibrant mosaic. The bright color choices help bring her work to life; Saint Phalle's color choices and art work served as a form of therapy that helped her to cope with the traumas she had experienced throughout her entire life.

Inspiration for this work came from the Califia stories as well as California's history. The artist was inspired by reading of this legend in Assembling California, a book by Pulitzer Prize winner John McPhee, which described the geologic history of the Golden State.

Escondido, California, was chosen as the location for the garden for its semi-rural setting in order to perfectly set the tone. The city of Escondido partnered with the artist to build and maintain the sculpture garden. A wire fence surrounding the project was installed later, to protect the installation and reduce hazards to visitors. The Coast News has acclaimed Queen Califia’s Magical Circle as a San Diego region cultural landmark. The artist lived in the San Diego neighborhood of La Jolla until her death in May 2002.

== Materials and construction ==
The garden's wall is covered mostly in Mexican pebble stones, while the snakes and other sculptures are clad in many thousands of hand-cut glass, ceramic, and stone mosaic tiles. Some wall segments are also decorated with ceramic plaques engraved with Native American rock art and other symbols, as well as handprints and signatures from Saint Phalle's family and art team. Queen Califia herself is embellished with hand-cut mirrored glass, while the fountain uses gold leaf glass and is controlled by a solar-powered pump.

The wall, maze, and sculptures were constructed using polystyrene foam encased in a polyurethane skin, with applied fiberglass coating over a steel armature. The designs were based on Saint Phalle's original maquettes, with the aid of computer modeling and prototyping. The artist began work on Queen Califia in 2000. After her death, completion of the work was overseen by Niki's granddaughter Bloum Cardenas, and her longtime assistants. This was Saint Phalle's last major project.

== Sculptural features ==
A rippling 400-foot (120 m) "snake wall", ranging between 4 and 9 feet (1.2 and 2.7 m) in height, forms the perimeter of the garden. Colorful mosaic serpent sculptures are positioned along the top of the wall. The single entrance opens onto a maze whose short walls and floor are covered in black, white, and mirrored mosaic tiles. After navigating the maze, visitors can enter the courtyard where the ten primary sculptures are located. The ten freestanding sculptures—Califia, the fountain, and the eight totems—are influenced by an eclectic combination of Native American, pre-Columbian, and Mexican art.

=== Queen Califia, Egg Fountain and Eagle Throne ===
In the center of the garden is an 11-foot (3.4 m) mosaic sculpture of Queen Califia in gold glass armor, standing atop a 13-foot (4.0 m) eagle and raising a small bird above her head. Visitors can walk among the eagle's five legs and into a domed temple adorned with celestial symbols and plaques from another sculpture garden by Saint Phalle, the Tarot Garden. In the middle of the plaza is a golden egg-shaped fountain, which represents both Califia's magical reign over the sea and the birth-death-transformation cycle that serves as a recurring theme in Saint Phalle's works.

=== Totem figures ===
Eight totem sculptures measuring between 11 and 21 feet (3.4 and 6.4 m) tall surround Califia. They are covered with stylized symbols, creatures, and animals that played important roles in the mythologies of various indigenous peoples. The eagle is an especially prominent part of the work, as it figures significantly in Native American and indigenous Mexican legends. It also recurs frequently in Saint Phalle's other works, and was her personal symbol.

== See also ==
- Alcazar Garden – Public gardens in San Diego
- List of public art in San Diego
- List of sculpture parks
- Mingei International Museum
- Nikigator – 2000 outdoor mosaic sculpture by Niki de Saint Phalle
- Sensory garden – Garden area providing sensory experiences
- Sun God – Sculpture by Niki de Saint Phalle in San Diego, California, U.S.
- #19 Baseball Player – 1999 public artwork by Niki de Saint Phalle
