= Kit Carson Park =

Park in Escondido, California, United States of America

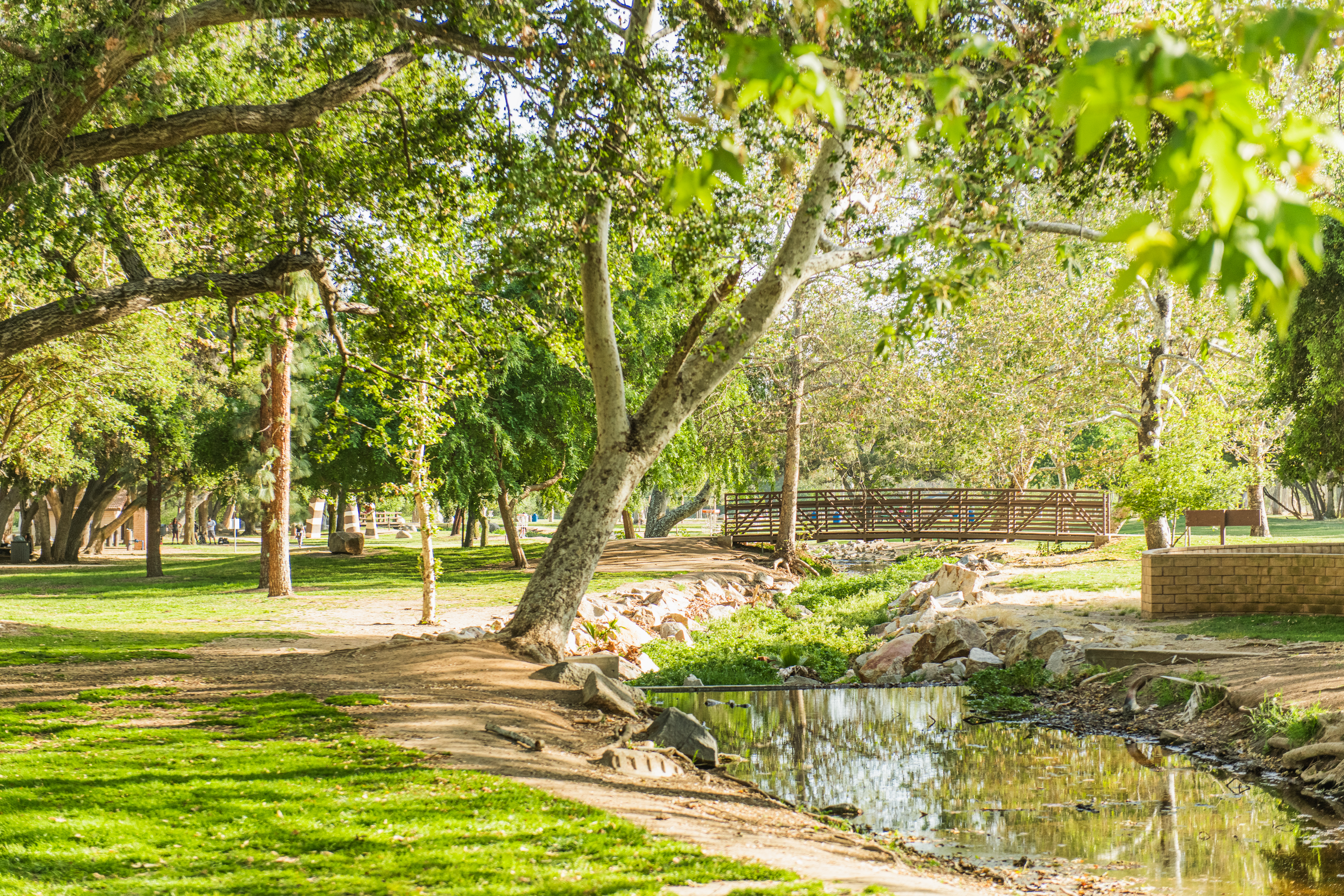
- The golf course at Kit Carson Park
- Interactive map of Kit Carson Park
- Type: Urban park
- Location: Escondido, California
- Coordinates: 33°4′48″N 117°3′46″W
- Area: 285 acres (115 ha)
- Created: 1967
- Operator: City of Escondido

Kit Carson Park is a 285-acre (115 ha) municipal park in Escondido, California, United States. The park was named after Christopher (Kit) Carson, the famous scout who guided Captain John C. Frémont over the Sierra Nevada during a government exploration expedition. The park sits in a valley that is approximately 5 miles (8 km) west of where Kit Carson fought in the Battle of San Pasqual. A historical monument commemorating the battle is located on Mule Hill, one mile southeast of the park.

== History ==
The City of Escondido acquired the land for its largest regional park from the City of San Diego in 1967. 100 acres (40 ha) of the park have been developed, and 185 acres (75 ha) have been preserved as natural habitat. The park has been described as the "city's recreation hub" with a "giant recreation complex".

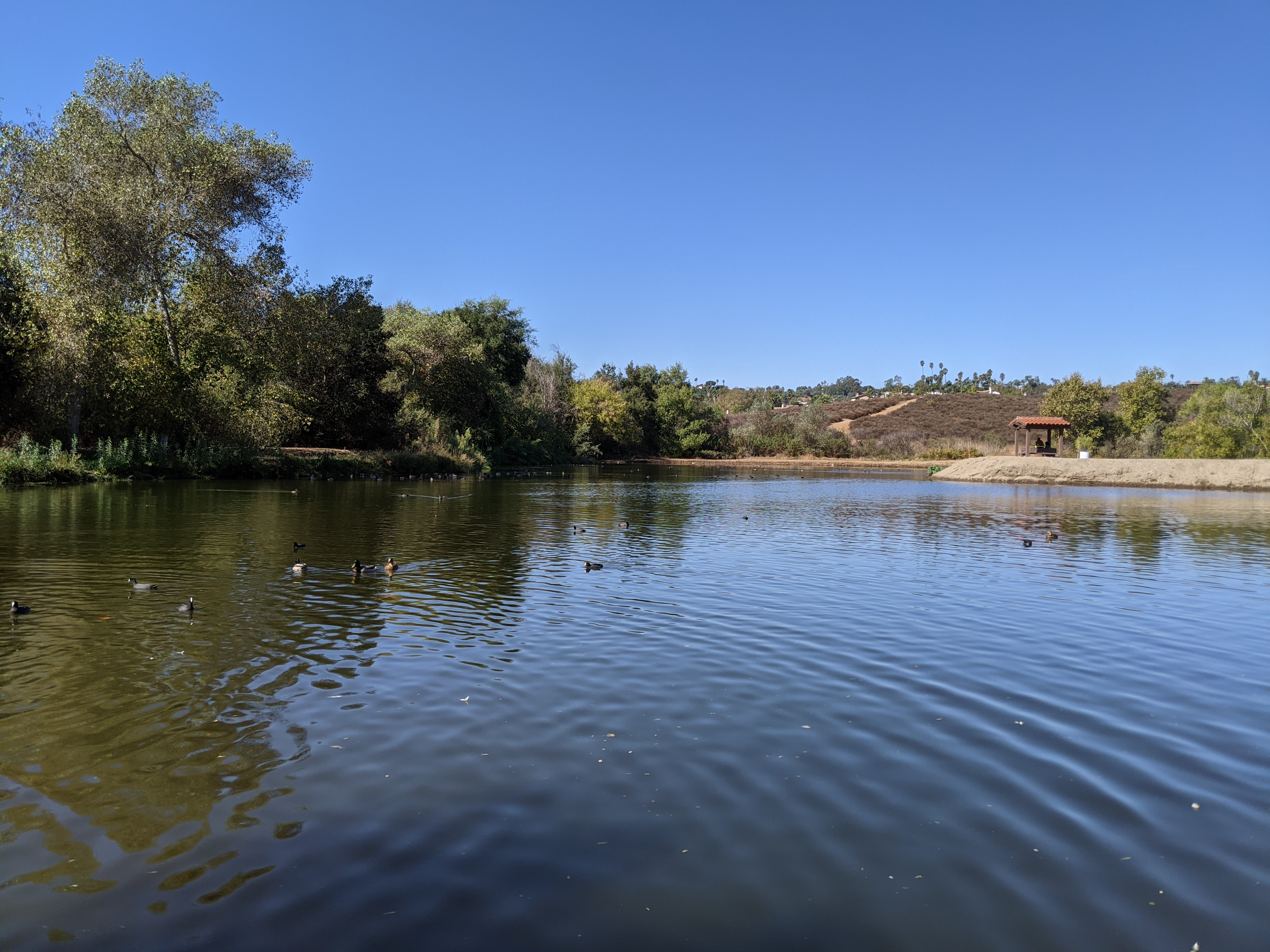
Duck Lake at Kit Carson Park

A Sports Center opened in 1997 which includes a 20,000-square-foot (1,900 m^{2}) skate park, a soccer arena and an arena for inline hockey. Solar panels are being installed at the sports center, as well as near the softball fields, as part of a bigger project to generate energy atop Escondido city facilities.

Escondido Skate Park features wooden ramps rather than concrete, found in typical skate parks. The wooden ramp make the park more flexible when it comes to adding ramps and other features, but also makes it prone to weather damage. The city of Escondido renovated the 22,000-square-foot park in 2009, removing rotted plywood, replacing hardware and waterproofing the new wood. More than 10,000 in-line skaters, skateboarders and BMX riders from age 6 to adult use the park each year.

Queen Califia's Magical Circle, the only American sculpture garden by the internationally acclaimed artist Niki de Saint Phalle, opened in 2003 at the park.

The park has been used as a command post and staging area during wildfires in the area.

== Park features ==
- Walking / hiking trails
- 5-acre arboretum: The Iris Sankey Magical Garden
- 3 ponds: Tree Lake, Duck Lake, and Sand Lake
- Tot lot / playground
- Shaded picnic areas with tables / barbecues
- Covered picnic shelter
- Open turf areas
- Lighted youth baseball and softball fields
- Lighted adult softball fields
- Lighted soccer fields
- Lighted tennis courts
- 3,000 capacity outdoor amphitheater
- Queen Califia's Magical Circle sculpture garden
- Eucalyptus Leaf Court public art piece
- Sports Center complex with pro shop
- 22,000 square-foot skate park
- 2 full-size covered roller hockey arenas
- 1 full-size soccer arena
- 1 "mini" soccer arena
- Girl Scouts of the USA Program Center, located at the north end of the park
- Disc Golf course

== Location ==
The park's entrance is located five minutes from I-15 (off exit 27 for Via Rancho Parkway) at the corner of Bear Valley Parkway and Mary Lane, and opposite from San Pasqual High School.

== See also ==
- Urban wild
- Urban park
