= The Three Graces (Rubens, Florence) =

Painting by Peter Paul Rubens

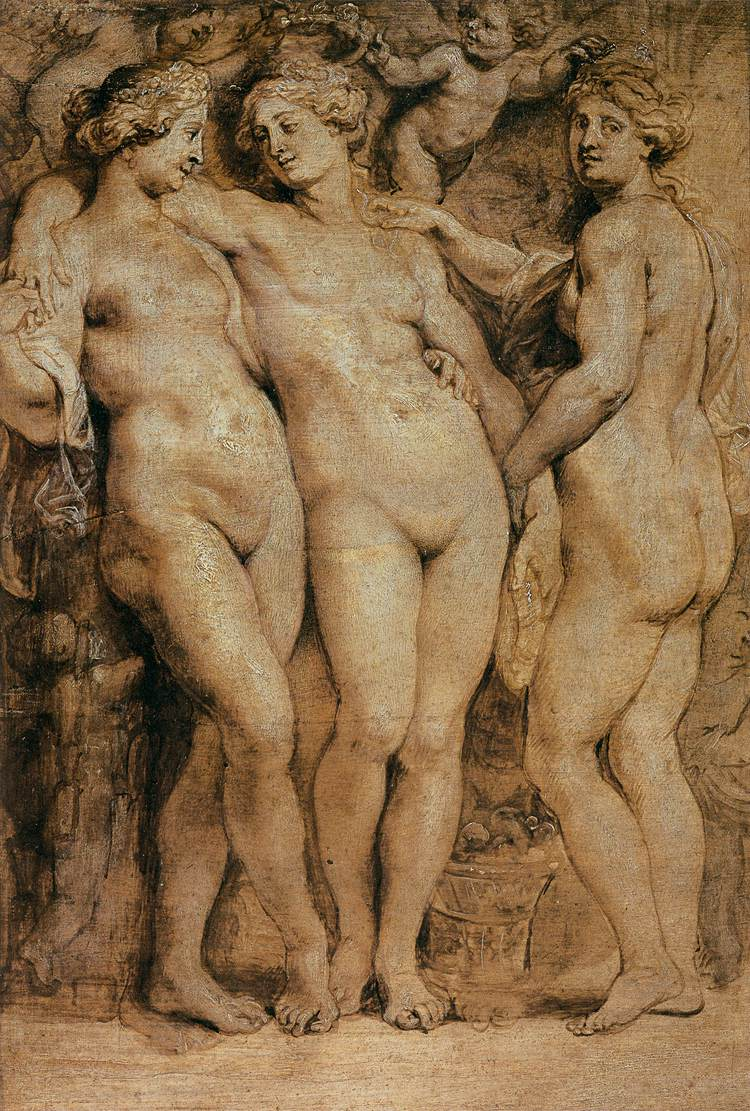
The Three Graces (1620-1623) by Rubens

The Three Graces is a grisaille painting by Peter Paul Rubens, dating to 1620–1623. It is now held in the Galleria Palatina in Florence.

It was acquired by Monsignor Francesco Airoldi, nuncio to Brussels, who offered it to Cardinal Leopoldo Leopoldo de' Medici, a great admirer of Rubens. The cardinal's art collection passed to the Uffizi after his death. The grisaille was transferred to the Palatina in 1928.
