= Three Graces (Mack) =

Sculpture by Heinz Mack

Coordinates: 43°10′37.0″N 87°56′13.5″W

- Artist: Heinz Mack
- Year: 1965
- Type: polished chrome-plated steel
- Location: Lynden Sculpture Garden; Milwaukee, Wisconsin

Three Graces is a public art work by artist Heinz Mack located at the Lynden Sculpture Garden near Milwaukee, Wisconsin, United States. The three pillars are named Thalia, Aglaia and Euphrosyne; they are attached to a base and installed on the lawn.
