= Charis (disambiguation) =

In Greek mythology, the Charites (singular Charis) were goddesses.

Charis may also refer to:

- Charis (mythology), one of several Charites, otherwise known as the Three Graces of Greek mythology
- Charis (name), including a list of people with the name
- Charis, Iran, a village
- Charis SIL, a typeface
- Eso-Charis, an Arkansas band
- Charis (butterfly), a genus of metalmark butterflies in the tribe Riodinini
- Charis (Safehold), a fictional nation in the Safehold series of books by David Weber
- 627 Charis, an asteroid
- Grace in Christianity, 'charis' in original Greek
