= Alcazar Garden =

Public gardens in San Diego

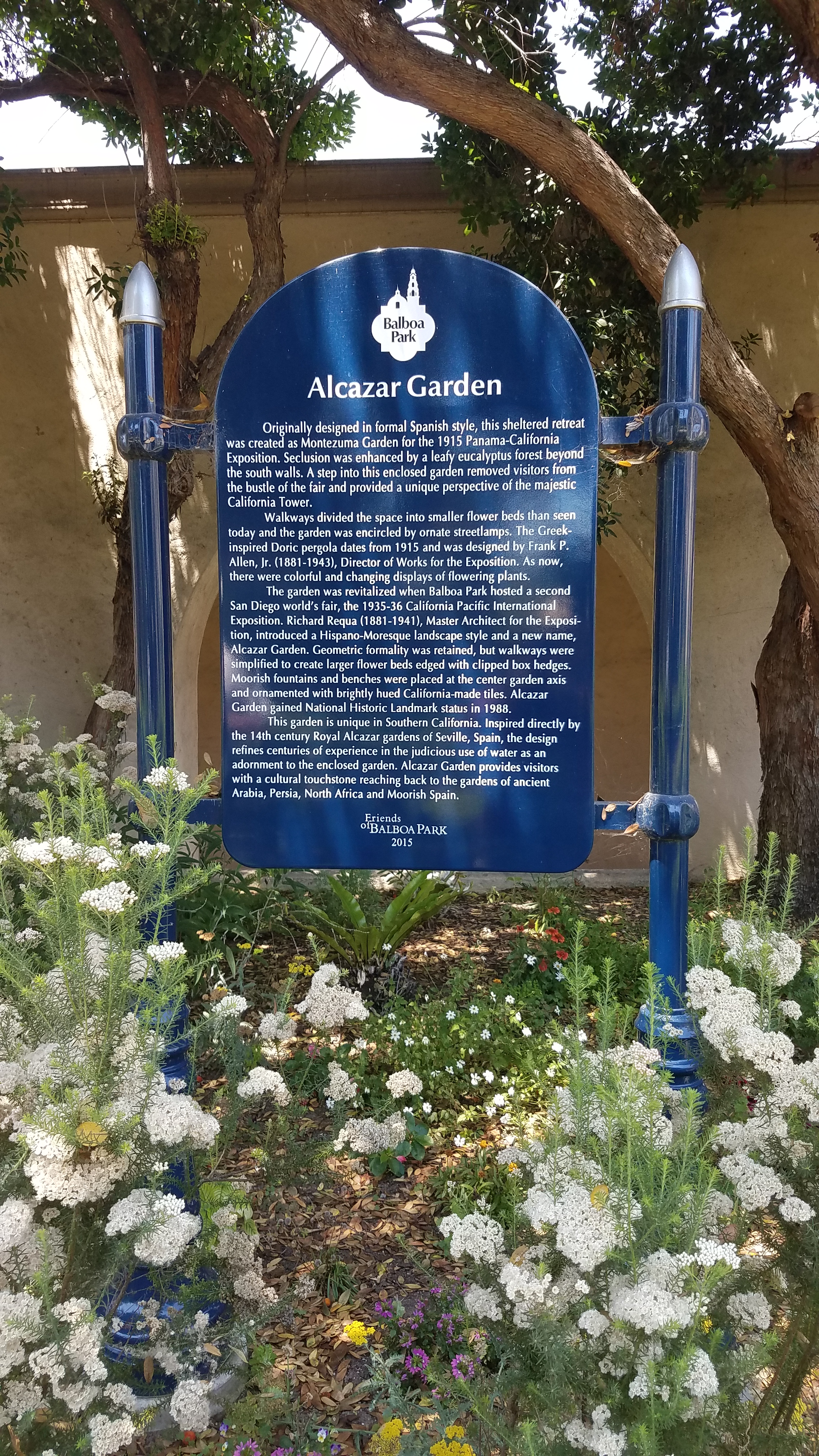

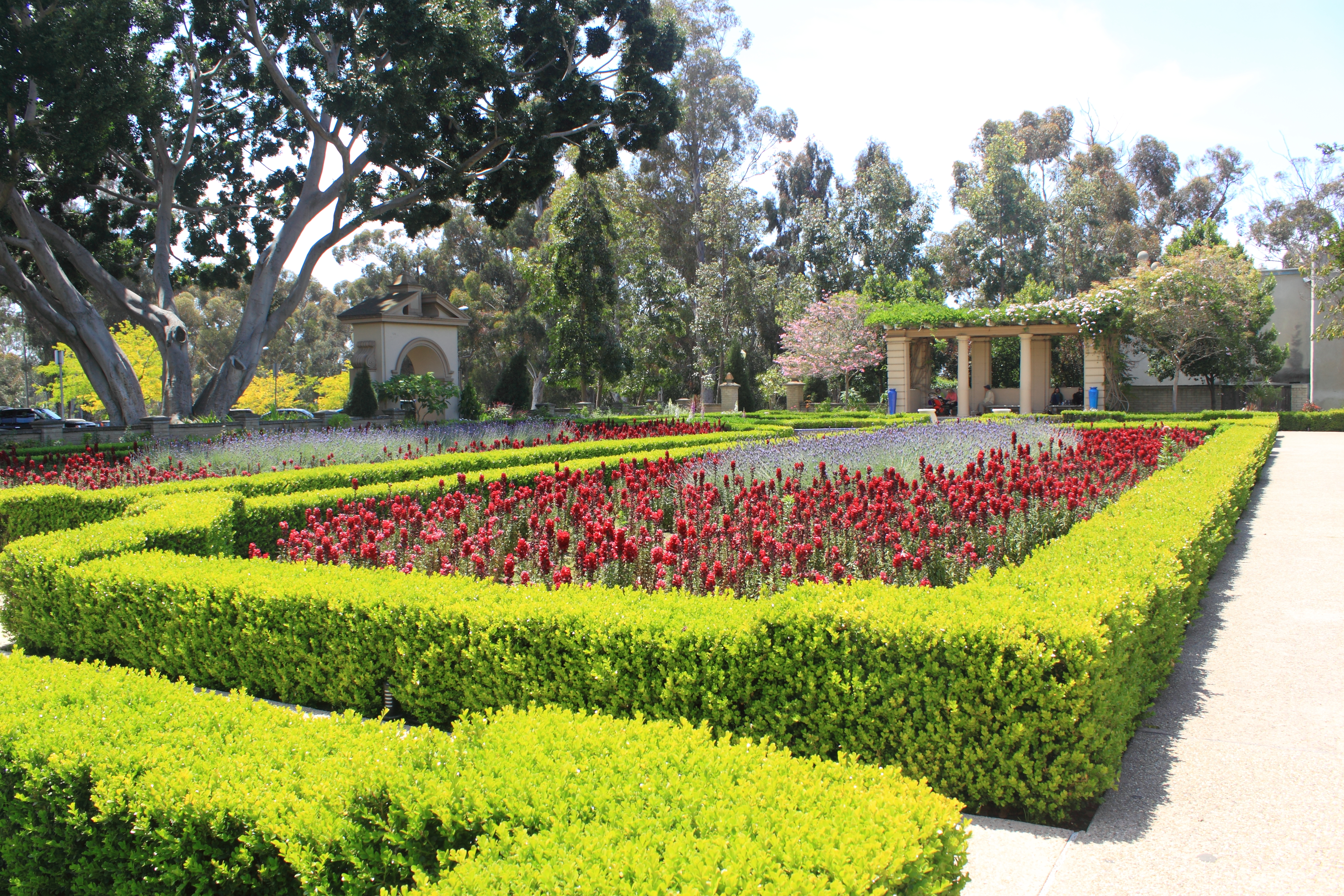
- The garden in 2010

- Location within San Diego Location within California Location within the United States
- Type: Public
- Location: San Diego, California, United States
- Coordinates: 32°43′52″N 117°09′06″W
- Status: Open year round

Alcazar Garden is a formal garden in Balboa Park in San Diego, California. It is named for Alcazar Castle in Seville, Spain; its design is patterned after the castle's gardens.

== Gallery ==
Alcazar Garden

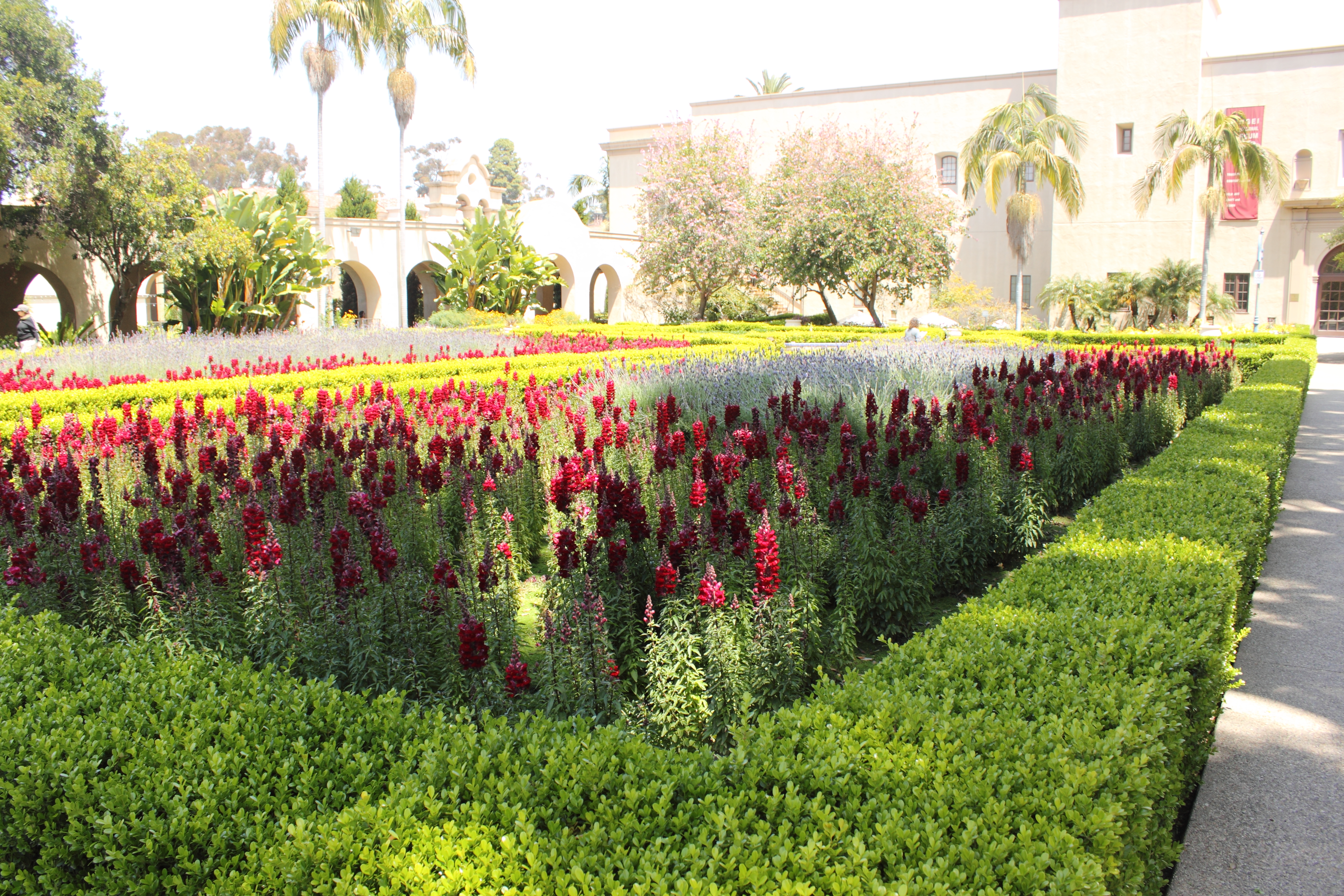

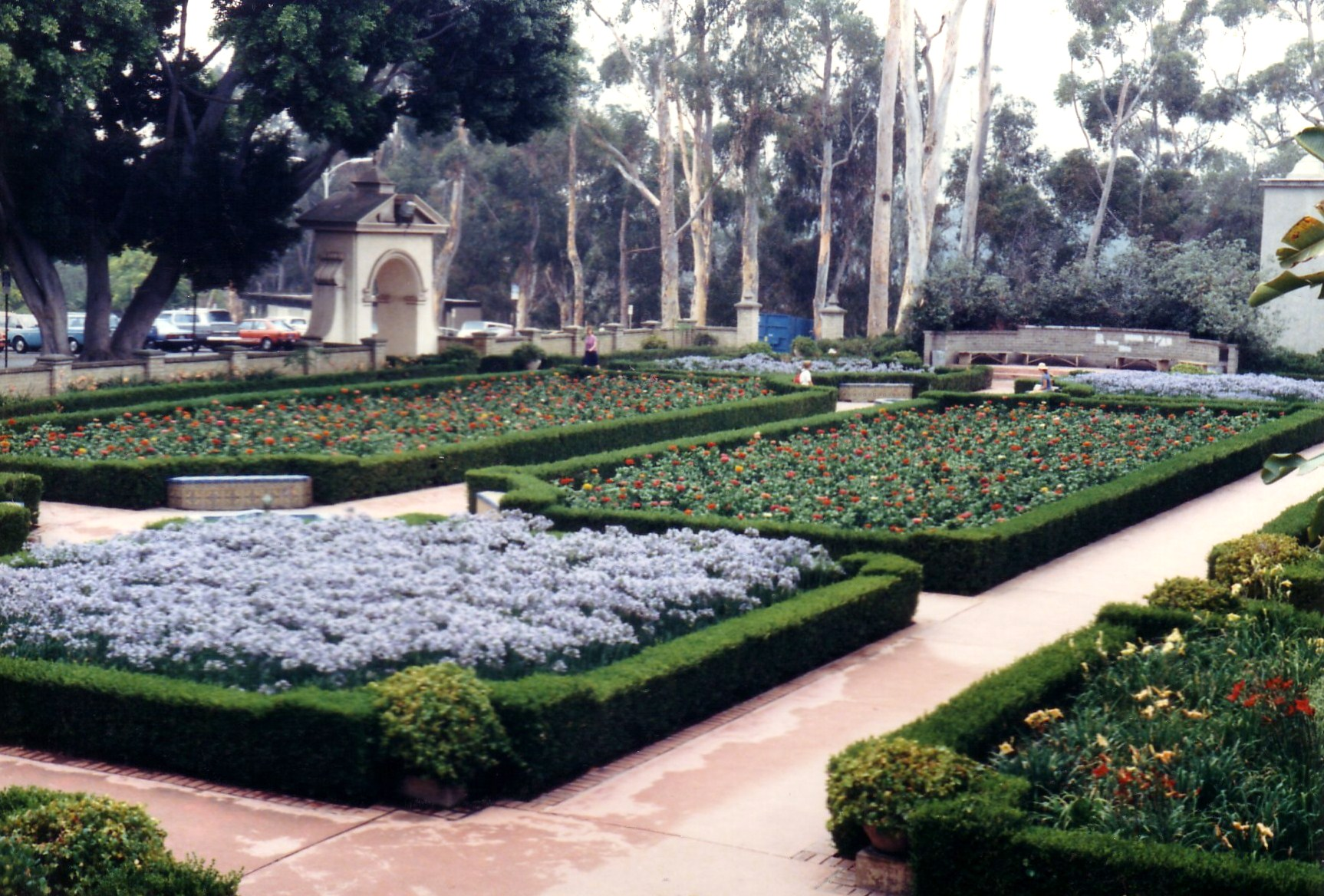

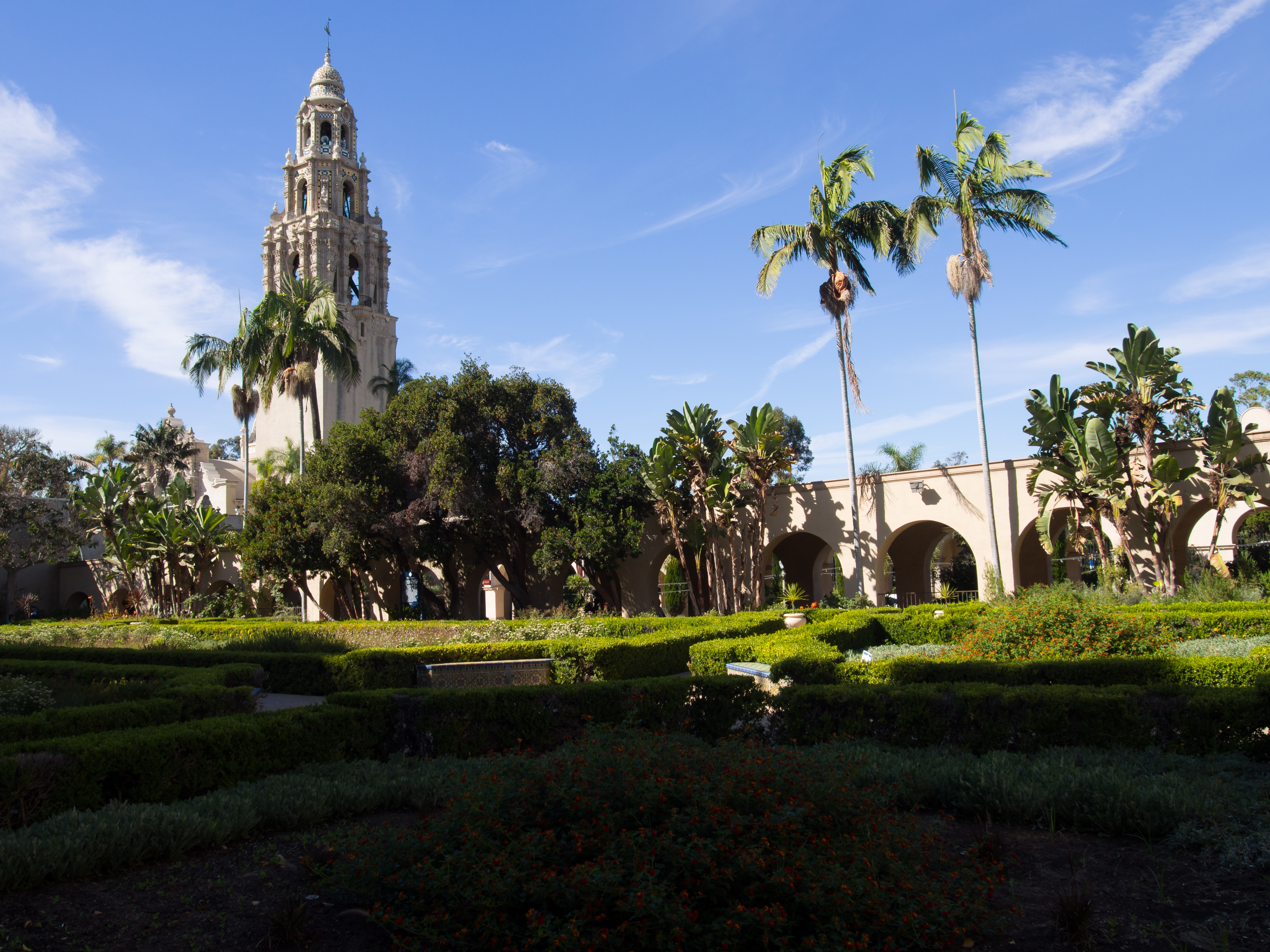
Sculpture: Le poète et sa muse ("Poet and His Muse", 1998) by Niki de Saint Phalle)

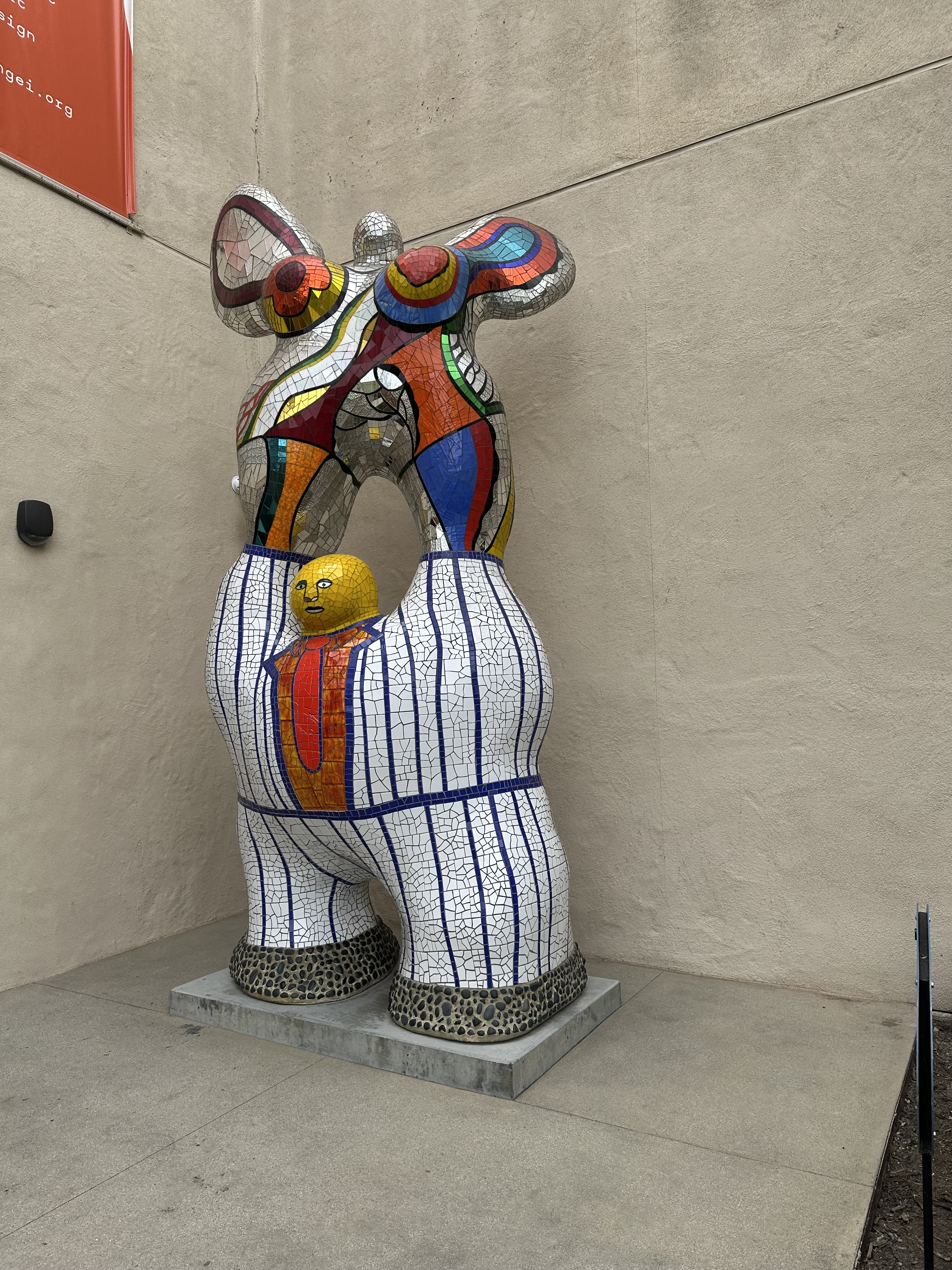
Statue at Alcazar Garden, Balboa Park 2024

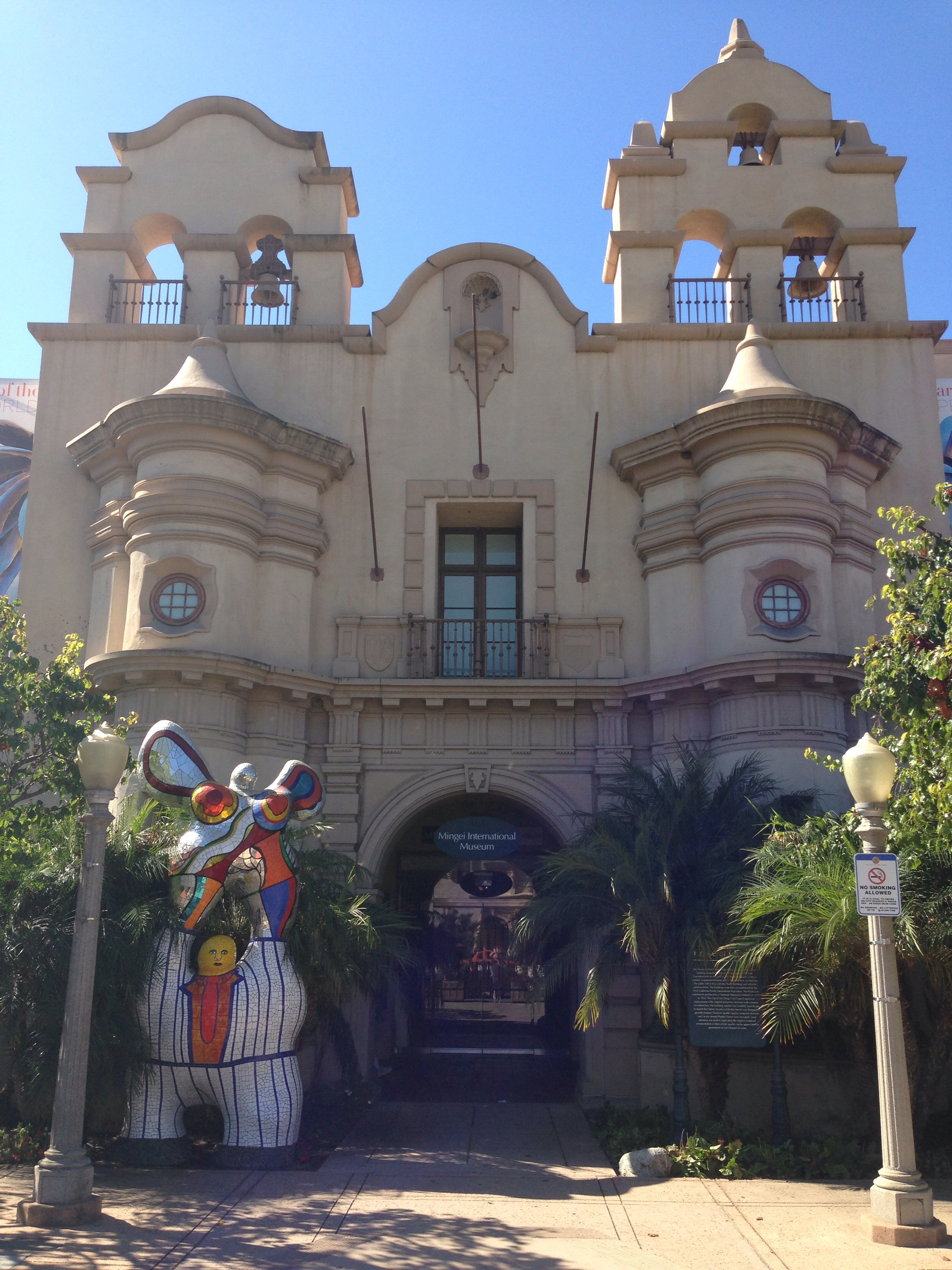
Mingei International Museum

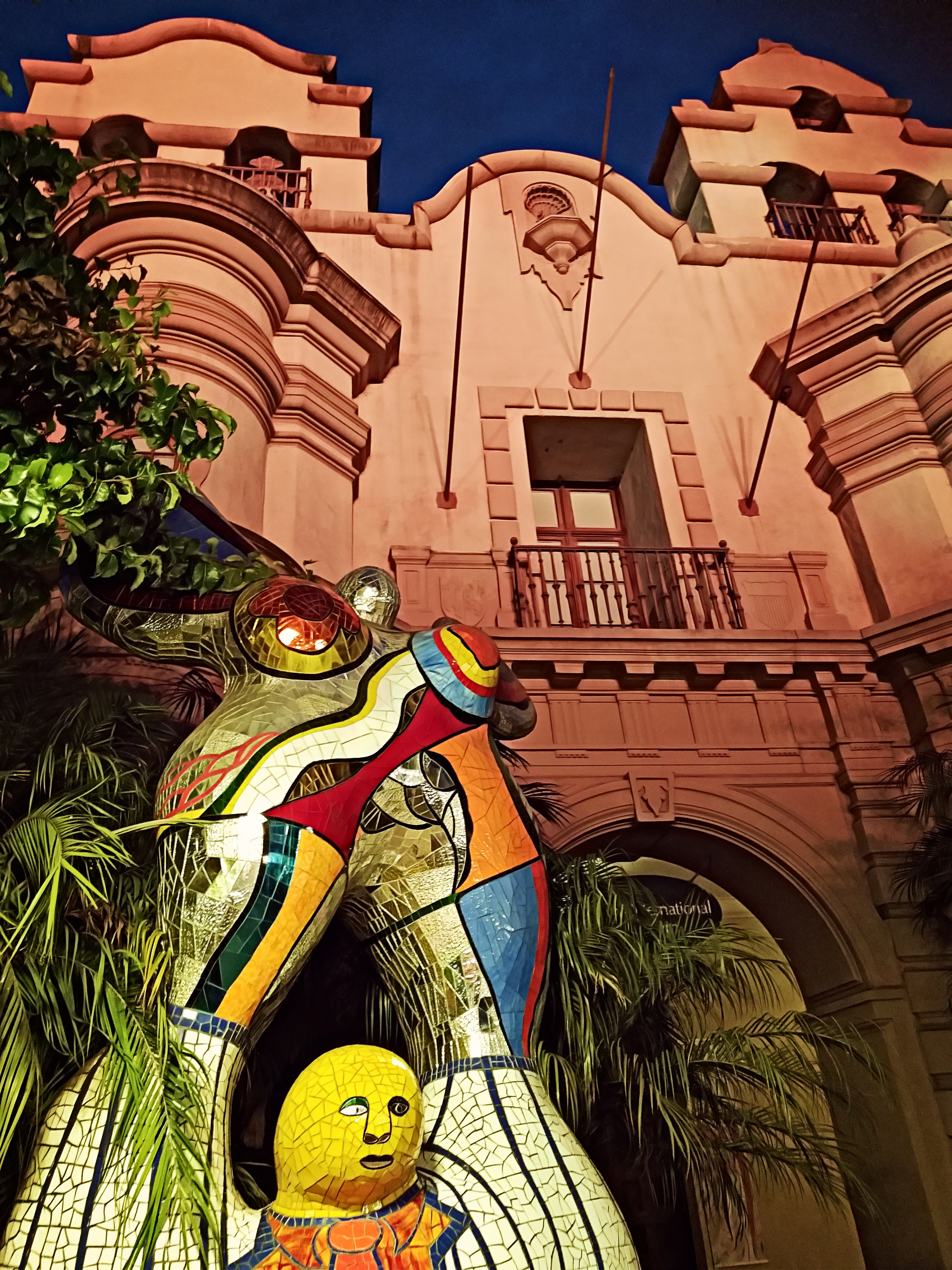

== See also ==
- May S. Marcy Sculpture Garden – Sculpture garden at the San Diego Museum of Art
