= No. 23 Basketball Player =

Sculpture in Washington, D.C., US

#23 Basketball Player
- Artist: Niki de Saint Phalle
- Year: 1999
- Type: fiberglass, mosaic
- Subject: Michael Jordan
- Location: National Museum of Women in the Arts; Washington, D.C., US; 38.90065°N 77.028333°W
- Owner: Niki Charitable Art Foundation

#23 Basketball Player is a sculpture by Niki de Saint Phalle, part of her Black Heroes Series, exhibited in the National Museum of Women in the Arts, New York Avenue Sculpture Project.

Colorful art statues, New York Ave., NW, in downtown Washington, D.C.

== Reviews ==
- Jacqueline Trescott (2010). "National Museum of Women in the Arts to turn D.C. corridor into sculpture alley". Style. The Washington Post. Retrieved 8 Feb 2011.
- Blake Gopnik (2010). "Sculptures add color to New York Avenue, but are they art?". Style. The Washington Post. Retrieved 8 Feb 2011.

== See also ==
- List of public art in Washington, D.C., Ward 2
