= Wilhelmina Holladay =

American art collector and philanthropist (1922–2021)

- Born: Wilhelmina Cole; October 10, 1922; Elmira, New York, U.S.
- Died: March 6, 2021 (aged 98); Washington, D.C., U.S.
- Education: Elmira College; University of Paris
- Known for: National Museum of Women in the Arts
- Spouse: Wallace Holladay (m. 1945; died 2012)
- Children: 2
- Awards: Women's Caucus for Art Lifetime Achievement Award (2001); National Medal of Arts (2006)
- Honours: Legion of Honour; Royal Norwegian Order of Merit

Wilhelmina Cole Holladay (née Cole; October 10, 1922 – March 6, 2021) was an American art collector and patron. She was the co-founder of the National Museum of Women in the Arts, and was awarded the National Medal of Arts in 2006.

== Early life ==
Holladay, known as "Billie", was born in Elmira, New York, on October 10, 1922. Her father, Chauncey Cole, worked as a businessman; her mother, Claire Elisabeth née Strong, was a housewife. She was close to her maternal grandmother, whom she credits with inculcating a perception of beauty. Holladay graduated with a degree in art history from Elmira College in 1944. She went on to study art history at Cornell University, before undertaking further studies at the University of Paris from 1953 to 1954.

During World War II, Holladay worked for the United States Air Force and the Embassy of China. In the latter capacity, she was employed as the social secretary of Soong Mei-ling, the wife of Chiang Kai-shek. She met Wallace Holladay while he was a naval officer in Washington, and later married him.

== Career ==
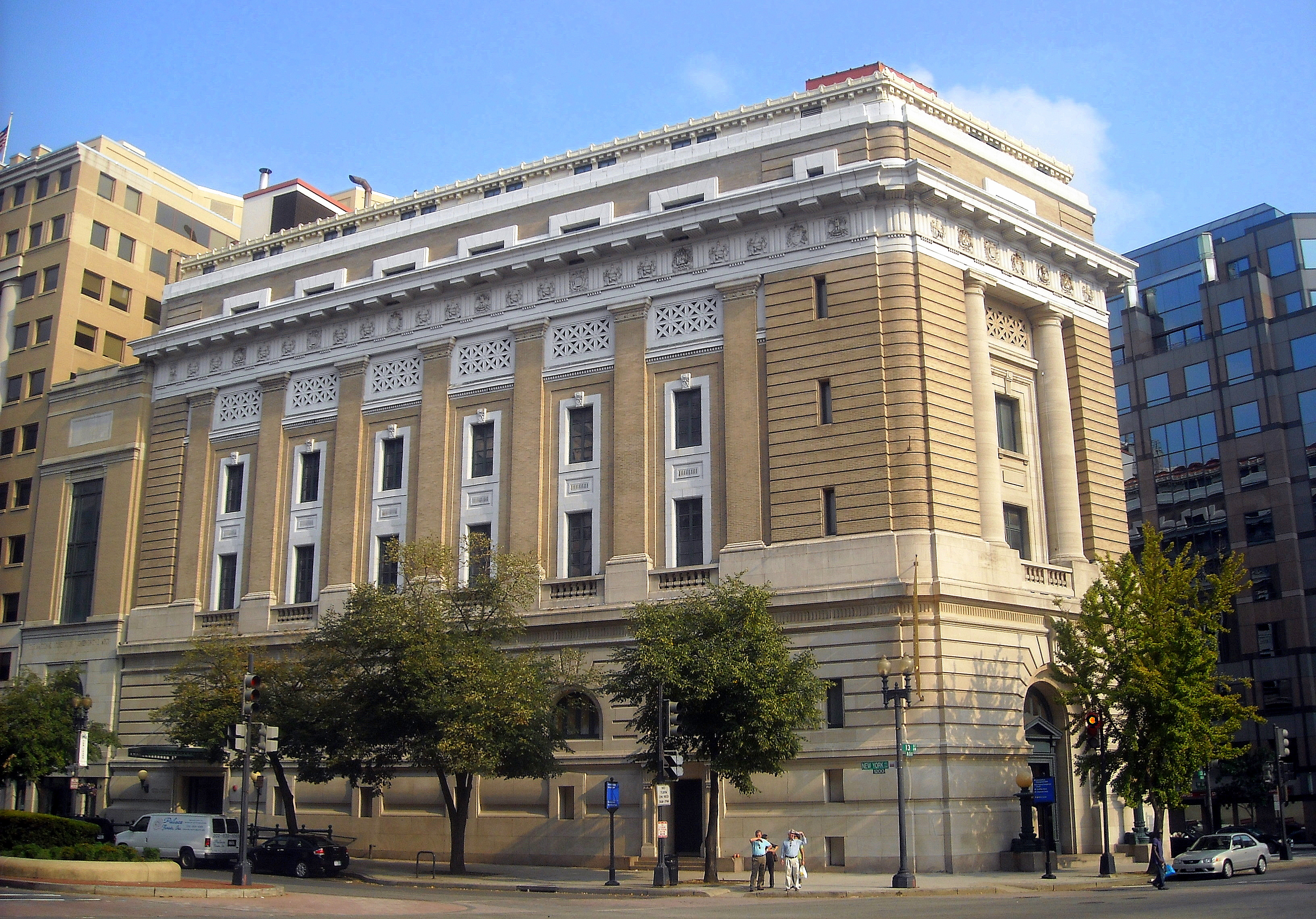
Holladay and her husband co-founded the National Museum of Women in the Arts

The Holladays began collecting art in the 1950s. On a trip to Europe during the 1970s, they saw and admired paintings by Clara Peeters at the Kunsthistorisches Museum in Vienna and the Museo del Prado in Madrid. They were dismayed to discover that neither Peeters nor any other female artist was mentioned in the leading art texts of the time. From that point, they began specializing in acquiring significant works by female artists such as Élisabeth-Louise Vigée Le Brun, Artemisia Gentileschi, and Angelica Kauffman. They ended up collecting 500 works by 150 painters and sculptors.

=== The National Museum of Women in the Arts ===
Holladay and her husband founded the National Museum of Women in the Arts in 1981, donating their collection of works by female artists. For the first few years, the collection was housed in the Holladays' home. She had consulted with the art historian Ann Sutherland Harris regarding long-term placement of her private collection, and Harris suggested she found a museum dedicated to women's art. In 1987, the museum acquired a former Masonic temple in Washington, D.C. as its permanent facility. The museum houses a permanent collection of art, presents changing special exhibitions and performances, maintains a library and research center, publishes exhibition catalogues, and offers educational programming.

== Personal life ==
Holladay married Wallace F. Holladay in 1945. They remained married until his death in 2012. Together, they had two children: Wallace "Hap" Jr. and Scott Cole, who predeceased her.

Holladay died on March 6, 2021, at her home in Washington, D.C. She was 98; no cause of death was announced.

== Honors and awards ==
Holladay was inducted into the National Women's Hall of Fame in 1996. Five years later, she was conferred a Women's Caucus for Art Lifetime Achievement Award. She received a Visionary Woman Award from Moore College of Art & Design in 2005, before being conferred a National Medal of Arts the following year. and a Foremother Award from the National Center for Health Research. Holladay also received two foreign honors: the Legion of Honour from the French government and the Royal Norwegian Order of Merit.

== Bibliography ==
Holladay authored the book A Museum of Their Own: National Museum of Women in the Arts, published by Abbeville Press.

== Sources ==
- Celebrity Birthdays
