= California Quadrangle =

- U.S. National Register of Historic Places
- U.S. National Historic Landmark District – Contributing property
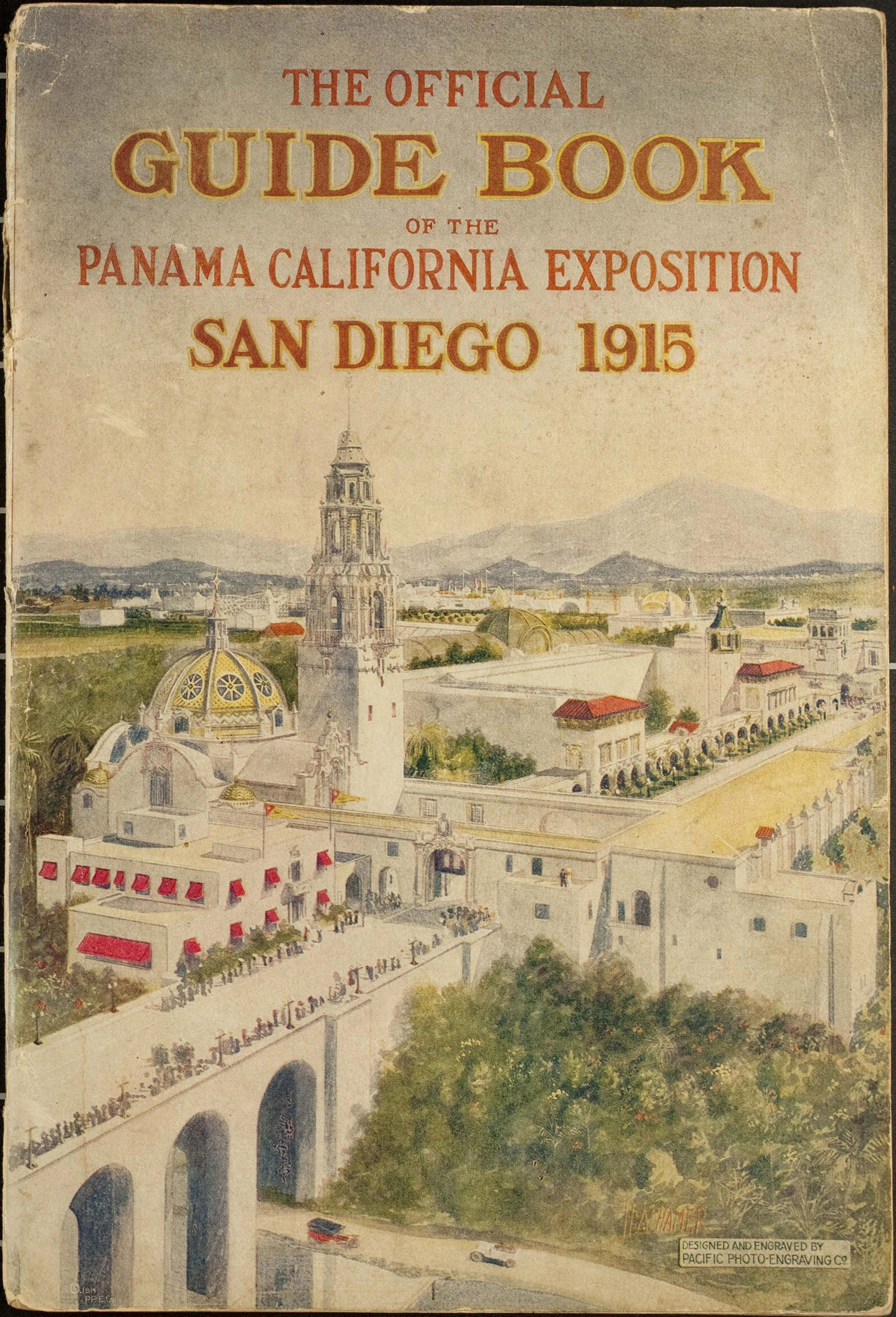
- California Quadrangle in 1915, with Cabrillo Bridge in the foreground, Administration Building (with red awnings), California Building (with dome and tower), Fine Arts Building (with yellow roof), St. Francis Chapel (far right)

- Location within San Diego Location within California Location within the United States
- Location: 1350 El Prado, San Diego, California
- Coordinates: 32°43′53.5044″N 117°09′8.481″W
- Built: 1911–1915
- Architect: Bertram G. Goodhue, Carleton Winslow, Irving Gill
- Architectural style: Spanish-Colonial Revival
- Part of: Balboa Park (ID77000331)
- NRHP reference No.: 74000548

Significant dates
- Added to NRHP: May 17, 1974
- Designated NHLDCP: December 22, 1977

The California Quadrangle, California Building, and California Tower are historic structures located in Balboa Park in San Diego, California. They were built for the 1915–16 Panama–California Exposition and served as the grand entry to the event. The buildings and courtyard were designed by architect Bertram Goodhue. They were added to the National Register of Historic Places on May 17, 1974. They now house the Museum of Us.

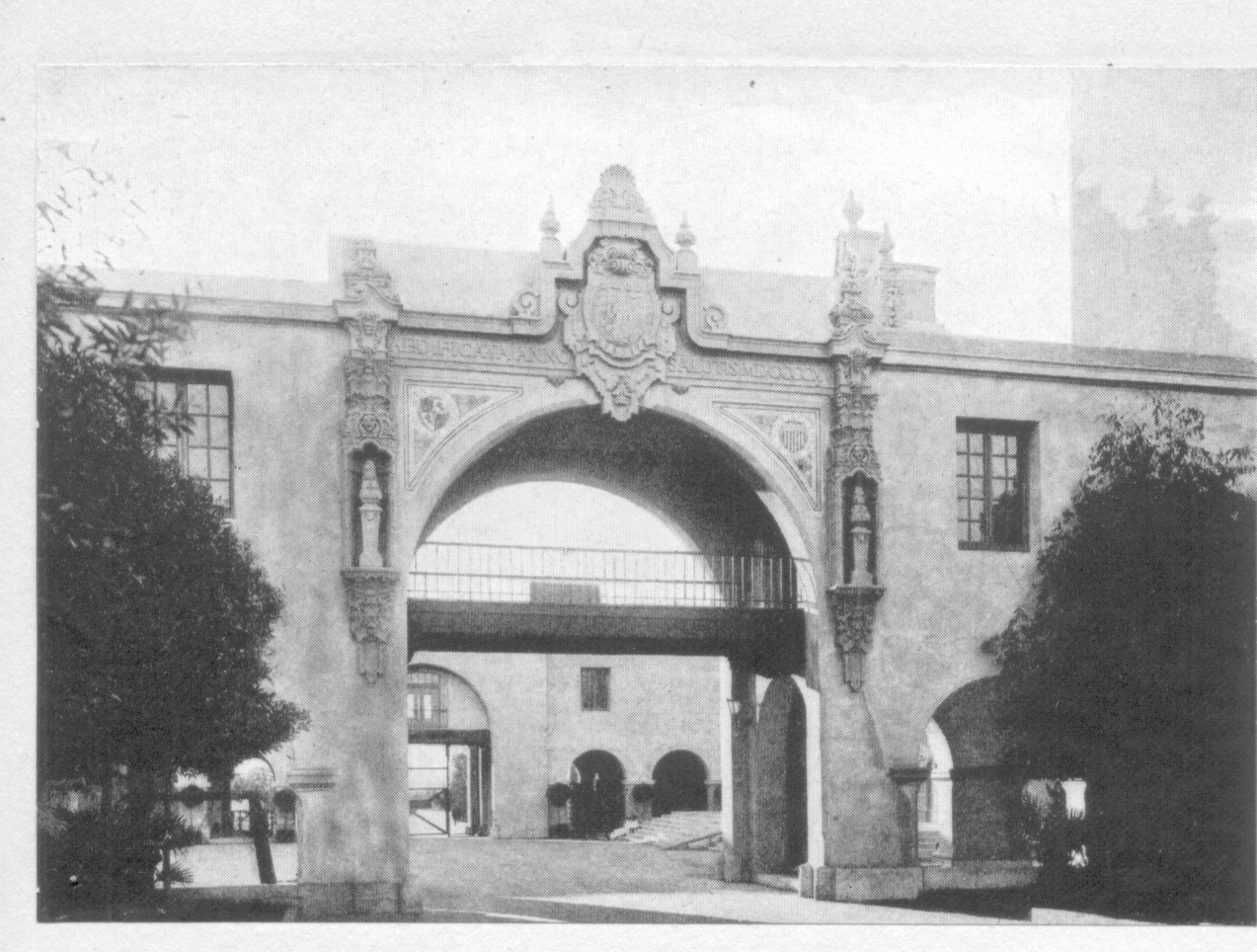
Entrance to the Plaza de California, 1916

The Quadrangle includes the California Building and Tower on the north side, and Evernham Hall and the St. Francis Chapel on the south side. Between them is an open space linked by arcaded passageways and massive arched gateways to form the Plaza de California. The original Balboa Park Administration Building (now the Gill Administration Building) lies just outside the Quadrangle, adjacent to and west of the California Building. Unlike most of the exhibits at the event, the Quadrangle buildings were intended to be permanent.

The Plaza de California is the main entryway to Balboa Park, approached over the Cabrillo Bridge. That entry is currently a two-lane road providing vehicle access to the park. The city approved plans to divert vehicle traffic away from the Plaza de California and restore it as a pedestrian-only promenade, hoping to complete the project in time to celebrate the 2015 centennial of the exposition. However, the plan was challenged in court and was overturned by a judge on February 4, 2013, on the grounds that the city had not followed its own Municipal Code requirements in approving it.

== California Building and Tower ==
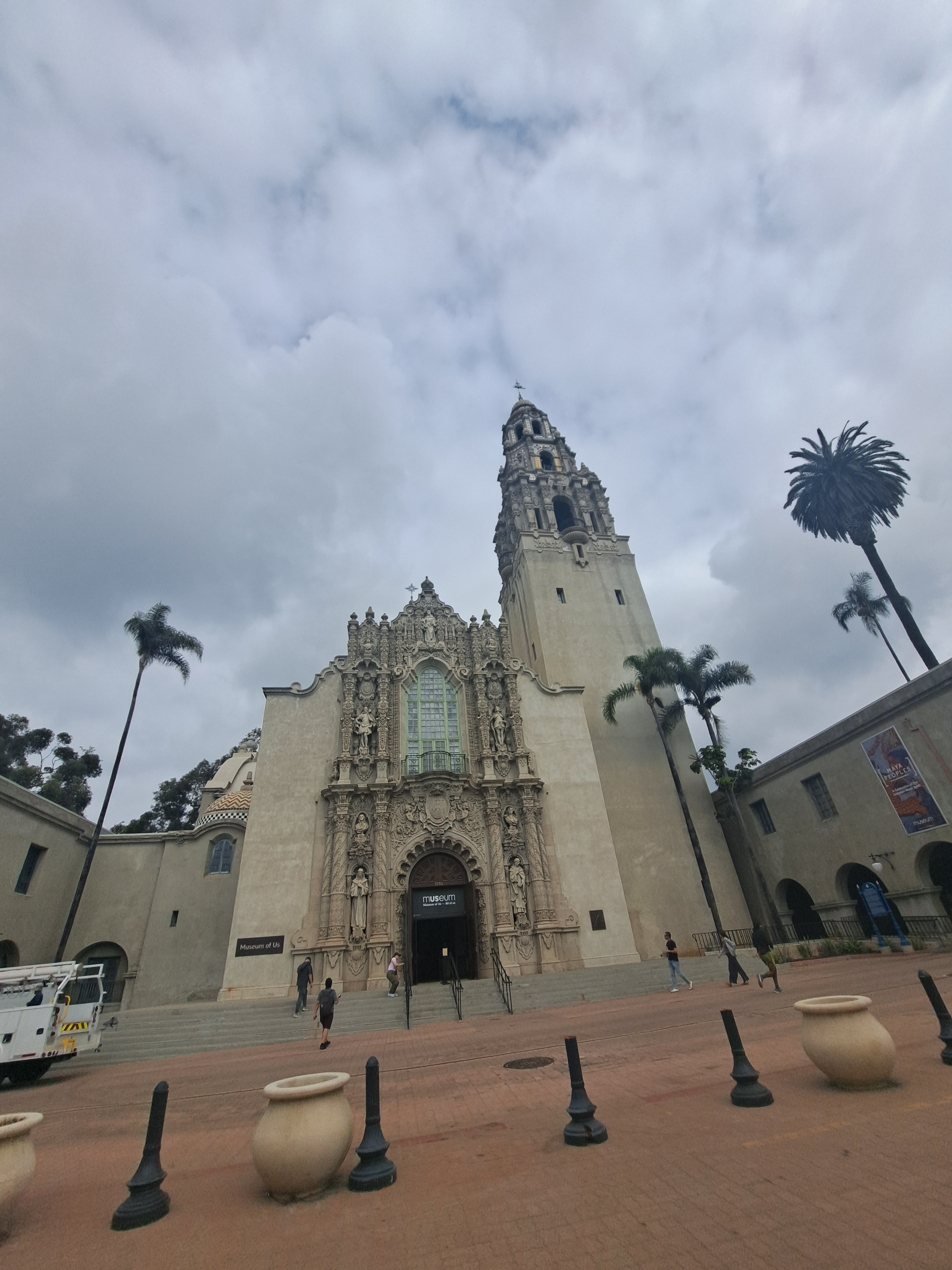
A front view of the California Tower and the Museum of Us

The California Building with its ornate facade and blue-and-gold dome, together with the adjoining California Tower, are among the most recognizable landmarks in San Diego. They house the Museum of Us. The design and ornamentation combine many style elements including Gothic, Plateresque, Baroque, Churrigueresque, and Rococo to create the impression of a Spanish Colonial church. The multi-tiered frontispiece is adorned with sculptures by the Piccirilli Brothers, a family of Italian marble carvers who also worked on famous monuments such as the Lincoln Memorial and the New York Public Library. Four of the six Piccirilli brothers are credited with doing work for the California Quadrangle. Attilio (1866-1945), the head of the studio, and Furio (1868-1949) modeled the historical figures and busts on the frontispiece of the California Building. Furio also produced the spandrel figures above the West Gate; a female representing the Pacific Ocean and a male representing the Atlantic Ocean were joined by the opening of the Panama Canal. Orazio (1872-1954) and Masaniello (called “Tom,” 1870-1951) executed the ornamental work and Churrigueresque frames on the building.

The dome's design looked to the dome at the Church of Santa Prisca and San Sebastián in Taxco, Mexico. The great central dome is encircled with the inscription "Terram Frumenti Hordei, ac Vinarum, in qua Ficus et Malogranata et Oliveta Nascuntur, Terram Olei ac Mellis", (A land of wheat, and barley, and vines, and fig-trees, and pomegranates; a land of oil olive, and honey), (Deuteronomy 8:8 taken from the Vulgate of St. Jerome; see also the Seven Species), as well as the California motto, "Eureka".

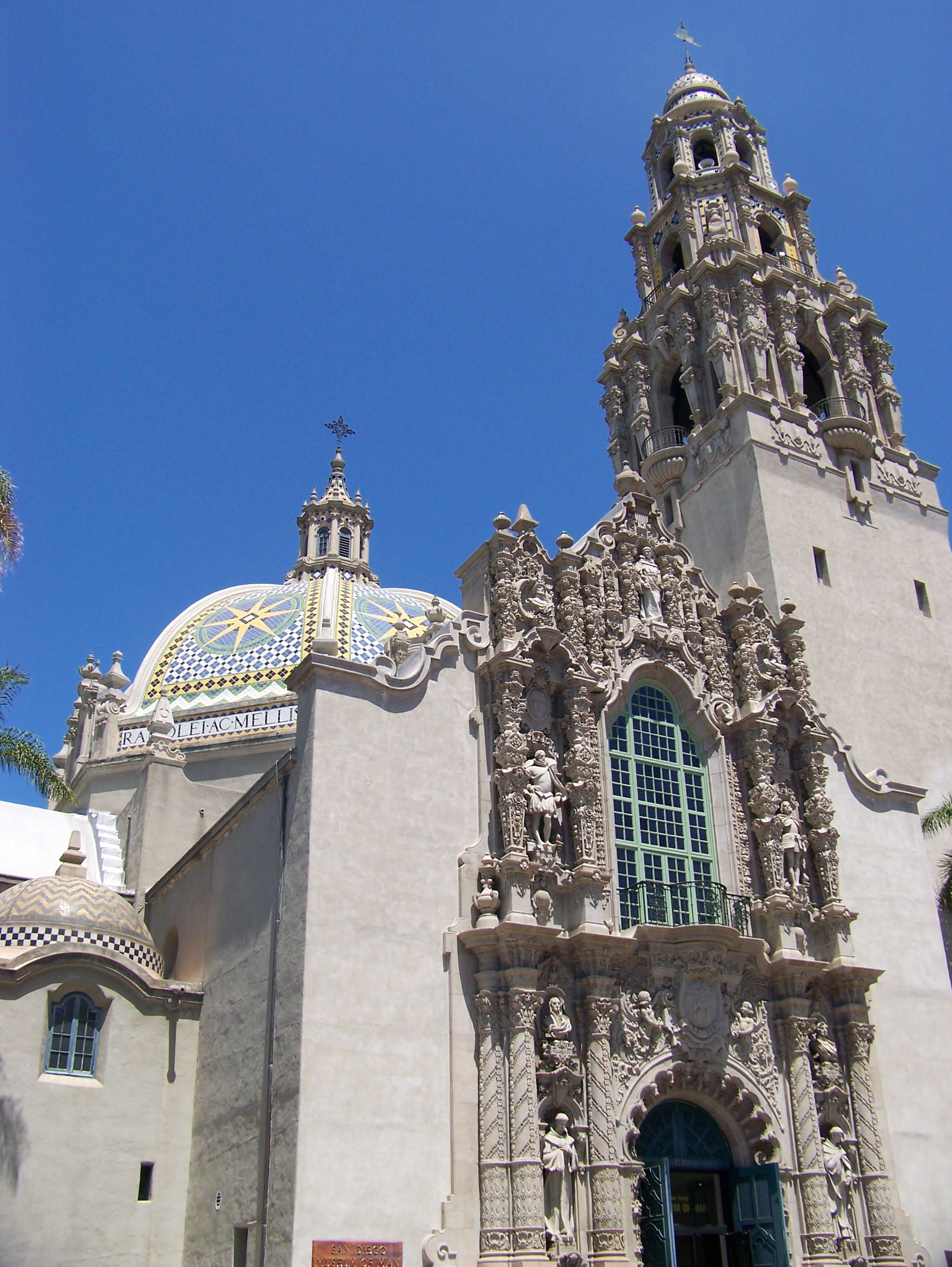
California Building and California Tower

The building's facade features stone ornamentation as well as many historical figures and busts sculpted from modeling clay and plaster, depicting prominent people from California, England, Mexico, and Spain. These include Junípero Serra, Philip III of Spain, Sebastián Vizcaíno, George Vancouver, Luís Jayme, Carlos III of Spain, Juan Rodríguez Cabrillo, Gaspar de Portolà, and Antonio de la Ascención. The facade also features the shield of the United States and the coats of arms of California and Mexico.

The California Tower is 198 feet (60 m) tall and is open for public tours as of January 1, 2015. The tower's design is Spanish while the details and color are Mexican in style. The tower is composed of three tiers that shift from a quadrangle to an octagon and then a circle. There is a Maas-Rowe carillon in the tower, first installed in 1946 and replaced in 1967. The carillon can be heard throughout the park. It plays the Westminster Chimes every quarter-hour, and a resident carillonneur plays three songs at noon every day. The tower has been described as "San Diego's Icon," the most photographed and best-known landmark in San Diego.

The State of California paid $250,000 to develop the California Building and Tower for the 1915 Exposition. Although California owned the building, it was turned over to the San Diego government in 1926. During the Exposition the California Building was the home of the expo's theme exhibit, an anthropological display called "The Story of Man through the Ages." After the expo ended, the exhibit was retained and expanded, known as the Museum of Man for several decades, until it was renamed as the "Museum of Us" in 2020.

== Fine Arts Building ==
On the south side of the Quadrangle is the fair's original Fine Arts Building (not to be confused with the Fine Arts Gallery, which opened in 1926 and is now The San Diego Museum of Art). The building is now used by the Museum of Us. It houses a banquet hall called Evernham Hall, and is also used for temporary exhibits.

== St. Francis Chapel ==
The St. Francis Chapel is a small chapel in Mission style, built to add a religious note to the expo. The interior design is simple except for an elaborately decorated and gilded Spanish-style altar. To the right of the carved statue of Our Lady and Child is an effigy representing Didacus of Alcalá, name-saint of the city, and to commemorate the early Jesuit missions in Arizona on the left is an unknown Jesuit saint. The chapel is not generally open to the public but is available for private events such as weddings and commitment ceremonies. It was used as a military chapel during World War II.

== Administration Building ==
Just outside the California Quadrangle, on the west, is the first building visitors encounter as they cross the Cabrillo Bridge and enter El Prado Complex. This is the Administration Building. It was constructed in Balboa Park as the Panama–California Exposition Administration Building, completed in 1911 and designed by Irving Gill. Gill designed the building in his high style. This style is sometimes called Mission style, but that is an incorrect label as it bears very little resemblance to the California Missions. After Gill left the exposition project, the design was augmented with the Bertram Goodhue style of Spanish Colonial ornamentation in an attempt to match the architectural theme of the rest of the exposition. The building contained numerous large offices and an auditorium. It served as the planning and administrative headquarters for the 1915-16 Exposition, as well as a place for international receptions. During World War II it was used as a military hospital. For many years after that the building was vacant, and the city proposed to tear it down in 1978, but it was eventually restored in the 1990s (sans ornamentation) and turned over to the Museum of Us. Today it is known as the Gill Administration Building and houses the administrative offices of the Museum of Us. It is the only building still in Balboa Park that bears Gill's signature style.

== Map ==
This is a schematic map of the Panama-California Exposition as it appeared in its second year, 1916. The California Quadrangle is the blue area on the left side of the map.

			Day nursery				Jardins de Eucalyptus	Japanese & Formosa Exhibit			North Gate
	gardens					United States		Botanical Building			Indian Village
Administration Building	California State Building			Science & Education		Plaza de Panama	Pan-Pacific	La Laguna de Las Flores	Foreign & Domestic	Calle Cristobal	Southern California Counties
Cabrillo Bridge	West Gate	Plaza de California	East Gate	El Prado, the central avenue							
	Fine Arts Building			Montezuma gardens	Russia & Brazil	Plaza de Panama	Foreign Arts	Canadian Building		Canyon Espanol	Service buildings
	Chapel of St. Francis		thick bosque	Palm Canyon		Esplanade	San Joaquin Valley				Hospital
					Via de los Estados	Plaza de Los Estados					Pepper Grove park
					Via de los Estados	Great Organ					
					Via de los Estados	Theosophical Building					
				Washington	Via de los Estados	Montana					
				New Mexico	Via de los Estados						
