= El Prado Complex =

- U.S. National Register of Historic Places
- U.S. Historic district
- U.S. National Historic Landmark District – Contributing property
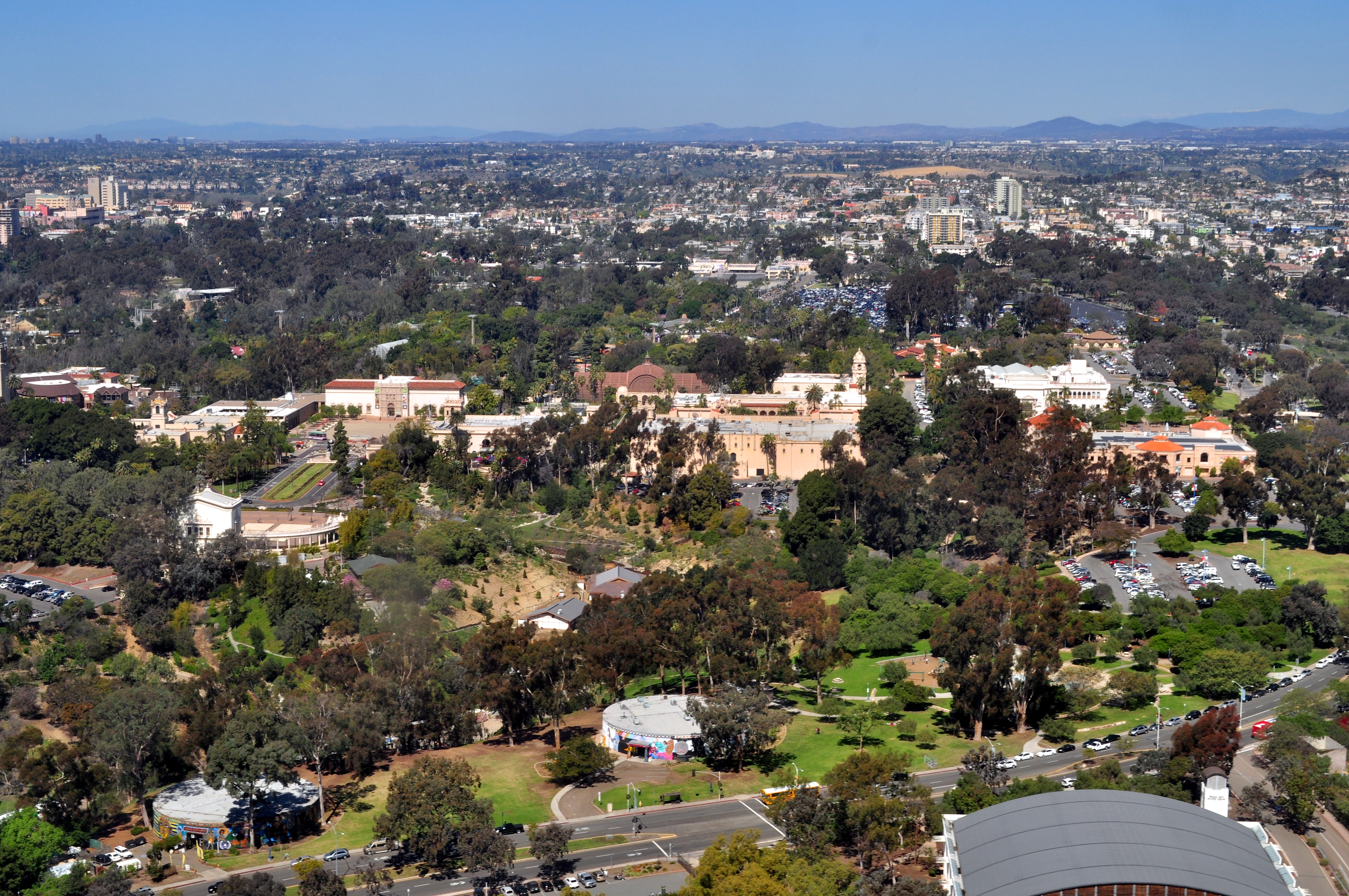
- Aerial view of El Prado Complex from the south

- Location within San Diego Location within San Diego County, California Location within California Location within the United States
- Location: Balboa Park, San Diego, California
- Area: 13 acres (5.3 ha)
- Built: 1935
- Architect: Goodhue, Bertram G.; Winslow, Carelton M.
- Architectural style: Mission Revival, Spanish Baroque
- Part of: Balboa Park (ID77000331)
- NRHP reference No.: 76000515

Significant dates
- Added to NRHP: December 12, 1976
- Designated NHLDCP: December 22, 1977

El Prado Complex is a historic district in Balboa Park in San Diego, California. The 13-acre (5.3 ha) complex includes 13 contributing buildings and one contributing structure. Most of the structures were built for San Diego's Panama–California Exposition of 1915–16 and were refurbished and re-used for the California Pacific International Exposition of 1935–36. The original architects were Bertram Goodhue and Carleton Winslow. The area was listed on the National Register of Historic Places in 1976.

== Components ==
The complex incorporates the following:

- Cabrillo Bridge, together with its approaches and guardhouses, built over a canyon in 1915 to serve as the primary entrance to the fair and Balboa Park, virtually unchanged since
- Alcazar Garden, built for the 1915 fair as Montezuma's Gardens, renamed Alcazar Gardens for the 1935 fair
- Spreckels Organ Pavilion, built for the 1915 fair and virtually unchanged since
- Plaza de Panama, an open space surrounded by the San Diego Museum of Art, the Timken Museum of Art, the House of Hospitality and the House of Charm; originally an open pedestrian plaza; used for parking in recent decades; currently closed to parking and being converted back into a pedestrian plaza
- El Prado Arcade, a continuous covered arcade and walkway demarcated by arches; basically unchanged from 1915 except for repairs
- Botanical Building, a lath-covered structure with two reflecting pools, built for the 1915 fair and re-used essentially unchanged for the 1935 fair
- House of Charm, originally built for the 1915 fair as the Indian Arts Building, renamed the Russia and Brazil building in 1916; intended to be temporary; changed to House of Charm for the 1935 fair; demolished in the 1990s for structural reasons and reconstructed using the original building as a model; now houses the Mingei International Museum
- House of Hospitality, originally built for the 1915 fair as the Foreign Arts Building; intended to be temporary; changed to House of Hospitality for the 1935 fair; demolished in the 1990s for structural reasons and reconstructed using the original building as a model
- Casa del Prado, originally built for the 1915 fair as the Varied Industries Building, renamed the Foreign and Domestic Industries Building in 1916; intended to be temporary; changed to Food and Beverage Building for the 1935 fair; housed the San Diego Aerospace Museum from 1963 to 1965; demolished in the 1960s for structural reasons and reconstructed using the original building as a model
- Electrical Building, originally built for the 1915 fair as the Commerce and Industries Building, renamed the Canadian Building in 1916; intended to be temporary; changed to the Palace of Better Housing for the 1935 fair; renamed Electrical Building after the fair; home of the San Diego Aerospace Museum from 1965 to 1978; burned down in 1978; reconstructed as Casa de Balboa
- The San Diego Museum of Art, built in 1926 as the Fine Arts Gallery; built on the site of the 1915 Sacramento Valley Building, renamed the United States Building in 1916, which was intended to be temporary and was demolished in 1924
- San Diego Natural History Museum building, built in 1933 on the site of the 1915 Southern California Counties building, which was converted to a Civic Auditorium after the 1915 fair and burned down in 1925; during the 1935 fair the new building was called the Palace of Natural History

== Map ==
This is a schematic map of the Panama-California Exposition as it appeared in its second year, 1916. El Prado Complex corresponds to El Prado, the central avenue (gray), together with the buildings and plazas on either side of it. The blue area between it and the Cabrillo Bridge is the California Quadrangle, also listed on the National Register.

| | | | Day nursery | | | | Jardins de Eucalyptus | Japanese & Formosa Exhibit | | | North Gate |
| | gardens | | | | | United States | | Botanical Building | | | Indian Village |
| Administration Building | California State Building | | | Science & Education | | Plaza de Panama | Pan-Pacific | La Laguna de Las Flores | Foreign & Domestic | Calle Cristobal | Southern California Counties |
| Cabrillo Bridge | West Gate | Plaza de California | East Gate | El Prado, the central avenue | | | | | | | |
| | Fine Arts Building | | | Montezuma gardens | Russia & Brazil | Plaza de Panama | Foreign Arts | Canadian Building | | Canyon Espanol | Service buildings |
| | Chapel of St. Francis | | thick bosque | Palm Canyon | | Esplanade | San Joaquin Valley | | | | Hospital |
| | | | | | Via de los Estados | Plaza de Los Estados | | | | | Pepper Grove park |
| | | | | | Via de los Estados | Great Organ | | | | | |
| | | | | | Via de los Estados | Theosophical Building | | | | | |
| | | | | Washington | Via de los Estados | Montana | | | | | |
| | | | | New Mexico | Via de los Estados | | | | | | |

== Gallery ==
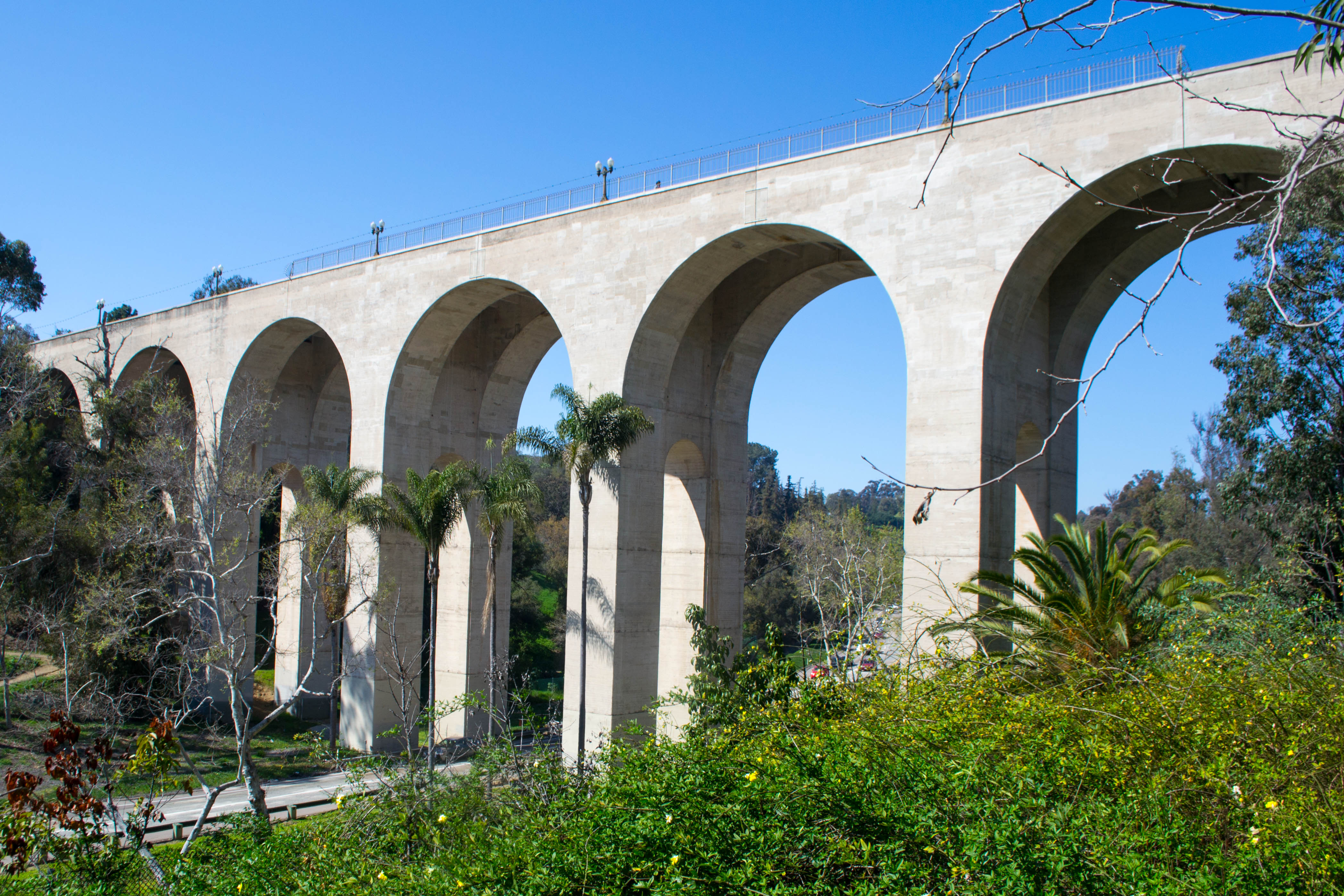
Cabrillo Bridge

Botanical Building

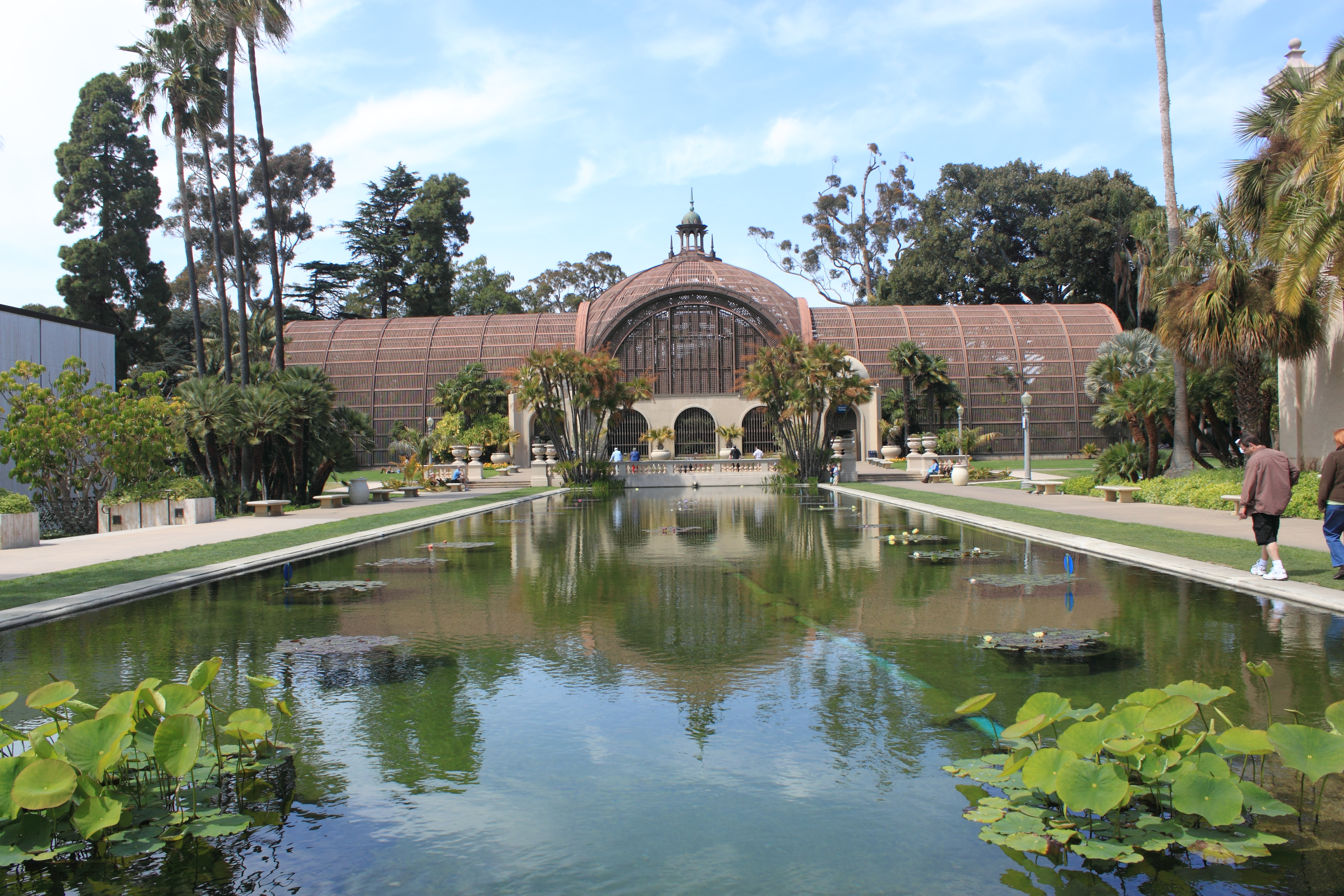
Botanical Building with its reflecting pool

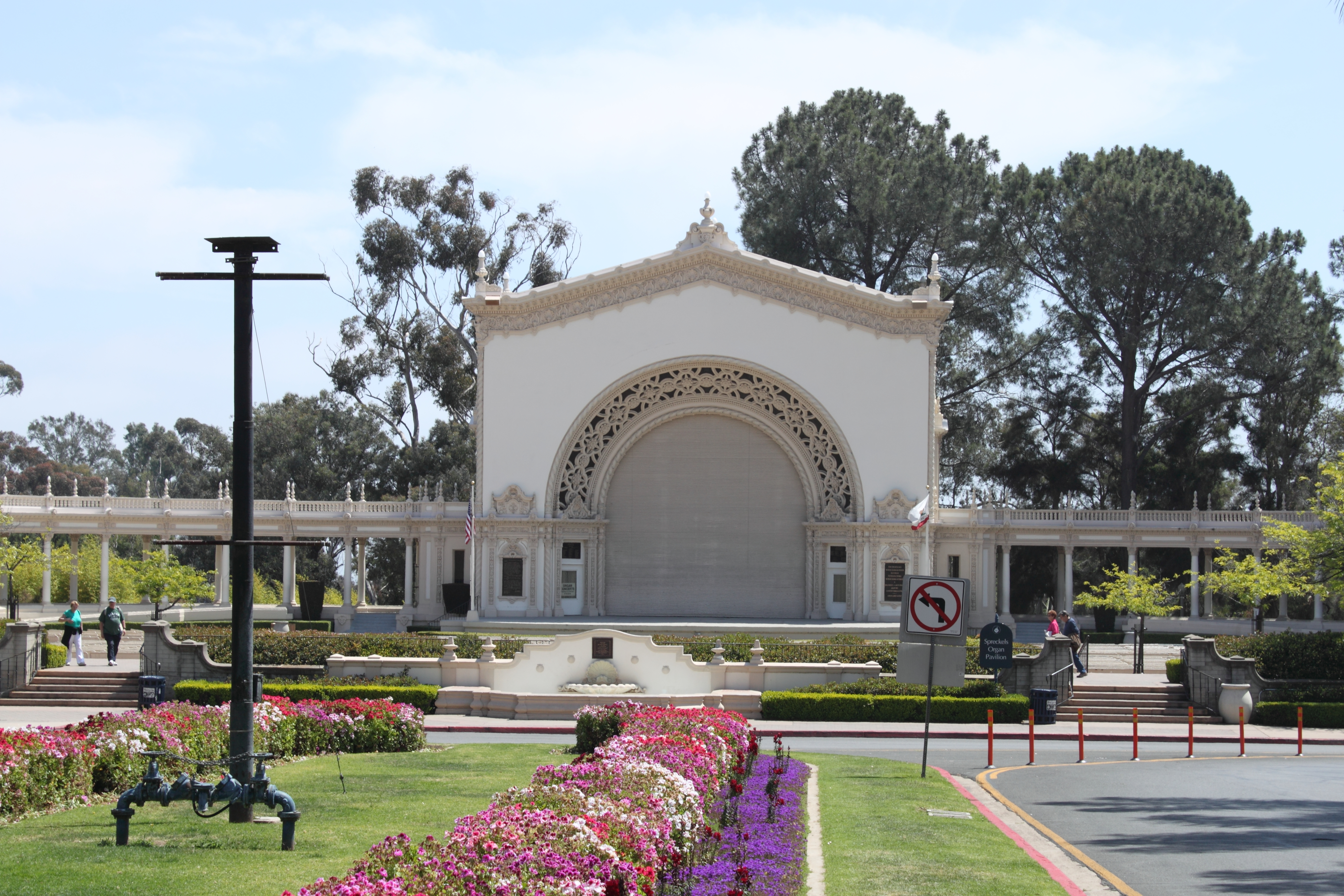
Spreckels Organ Pavilion

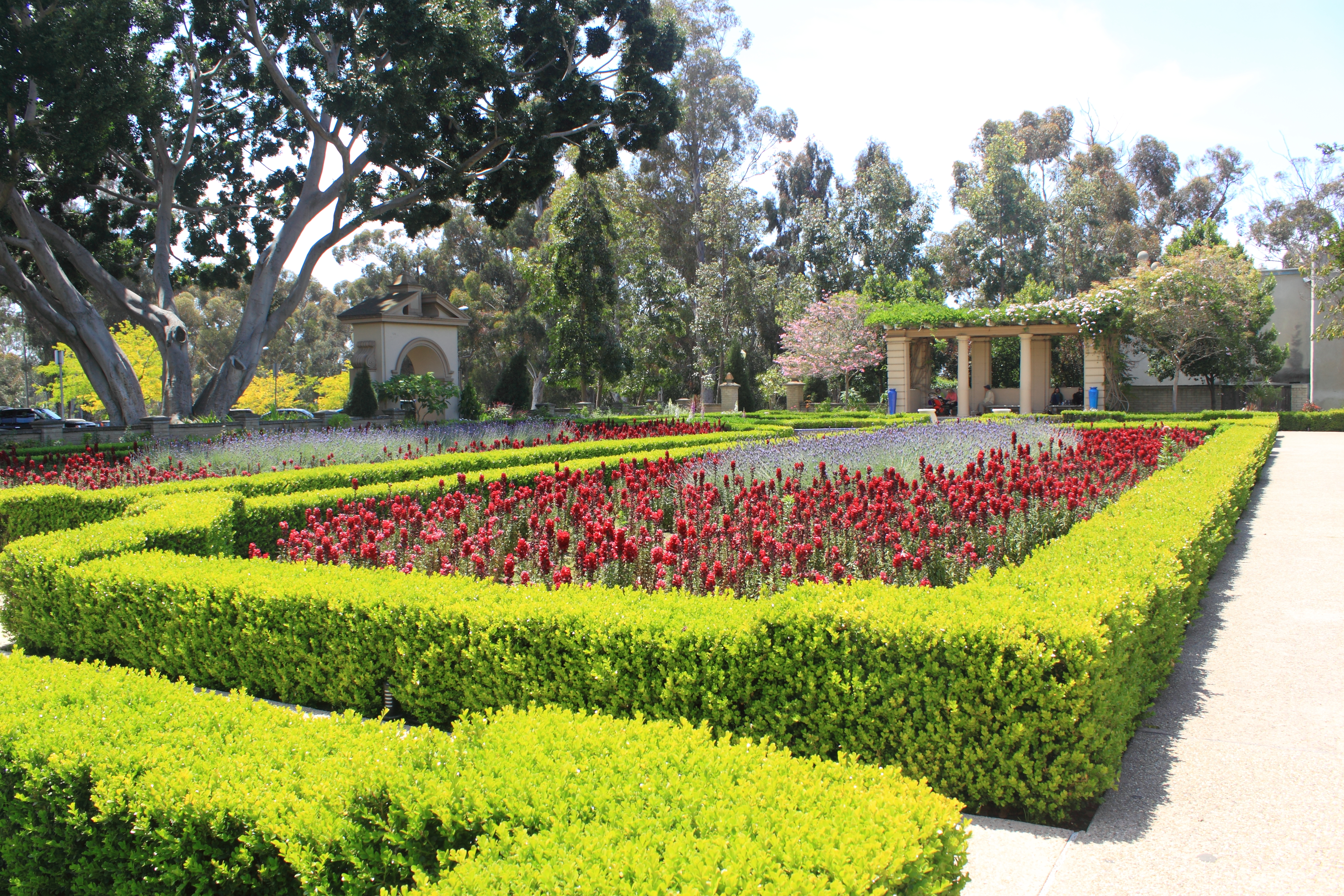
Alcazar Garden

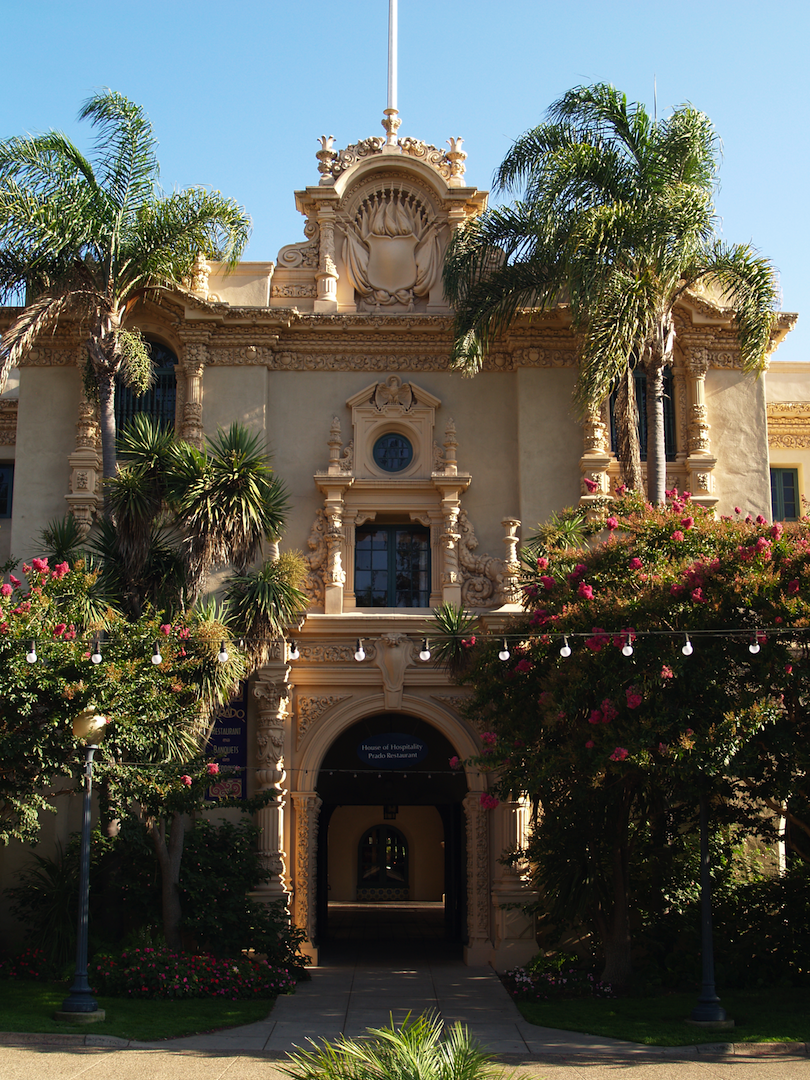
House of Hospitality

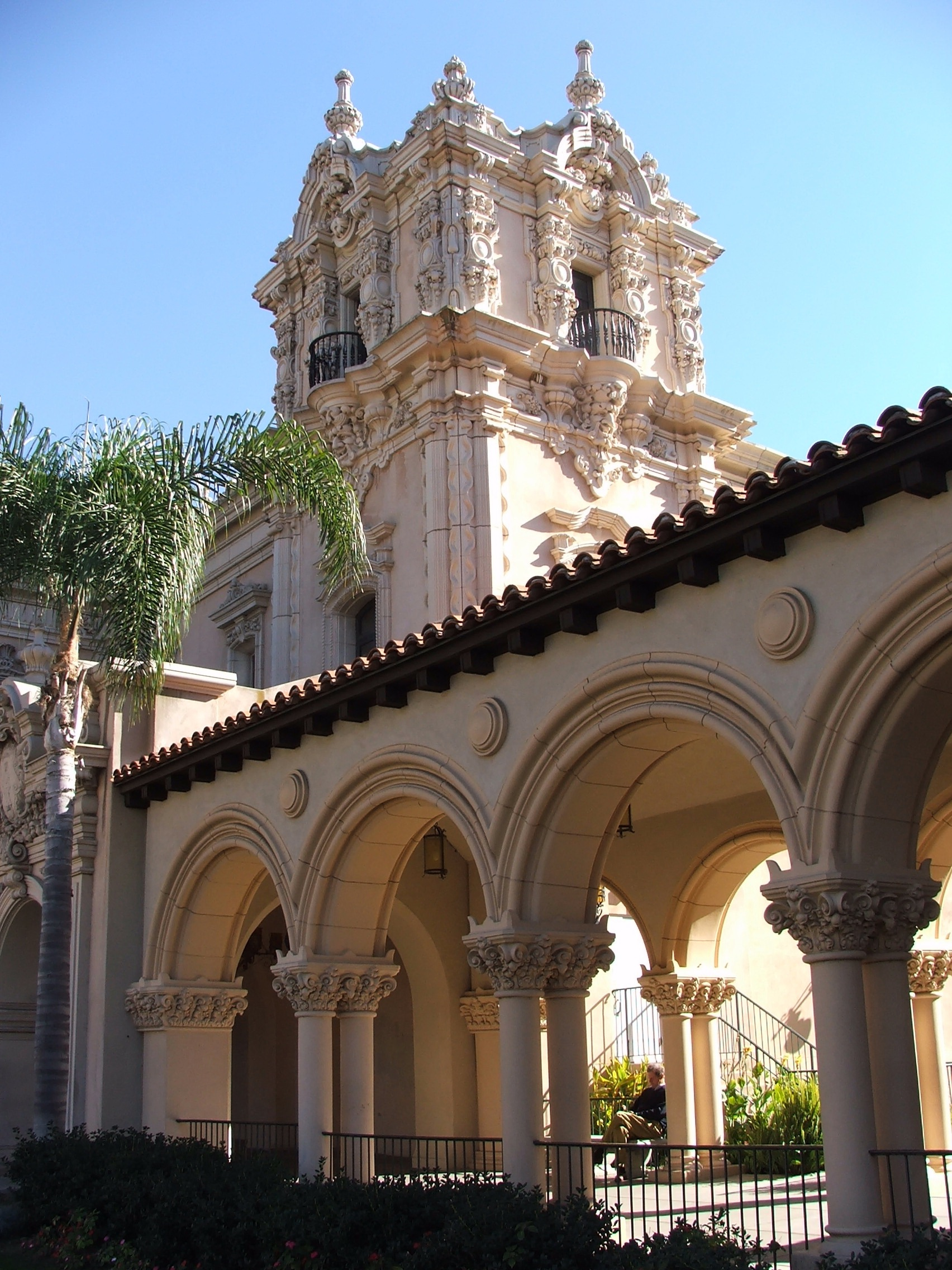
Casa de Balboa and the El Prado Arcade

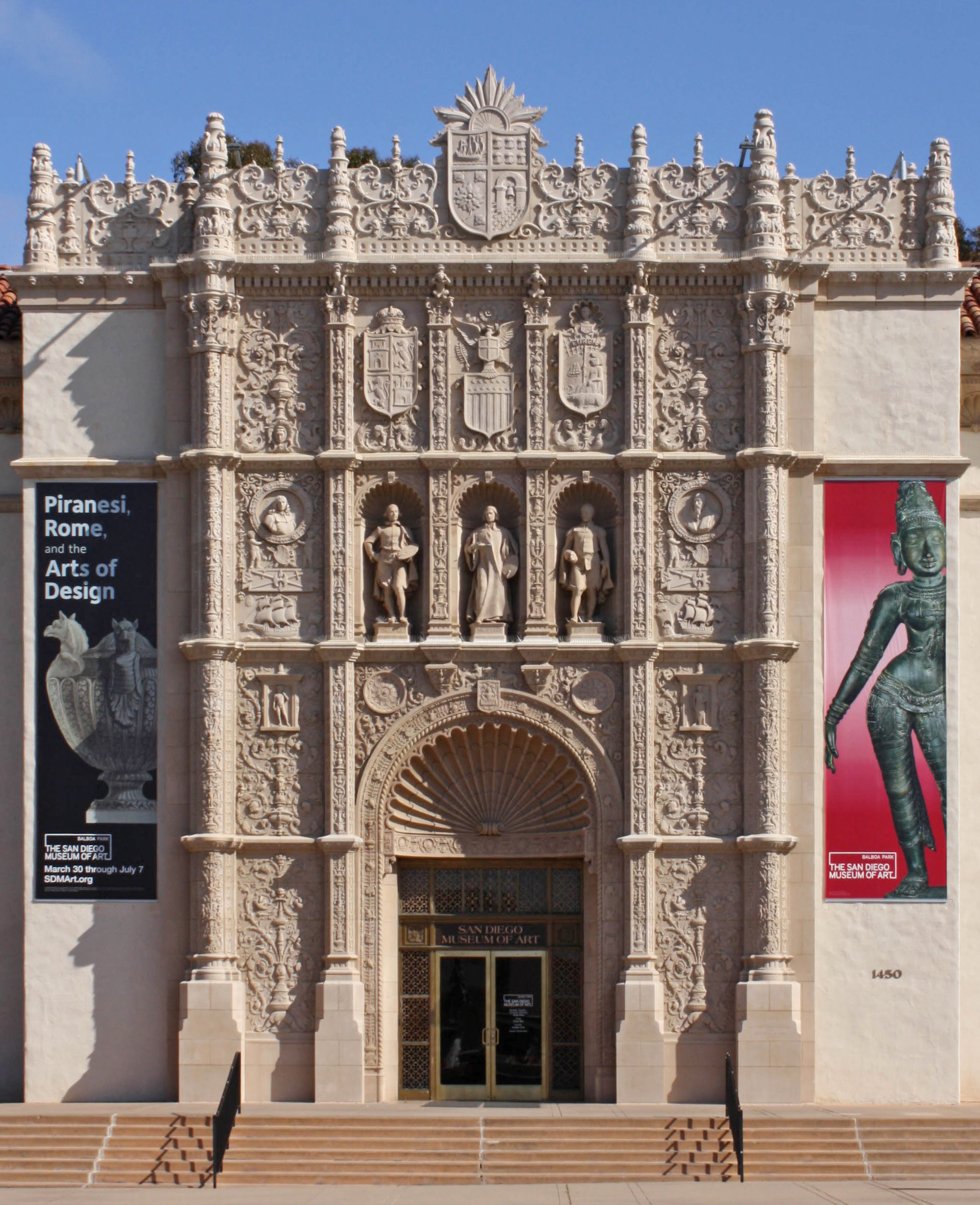
San Diego Museum of Art

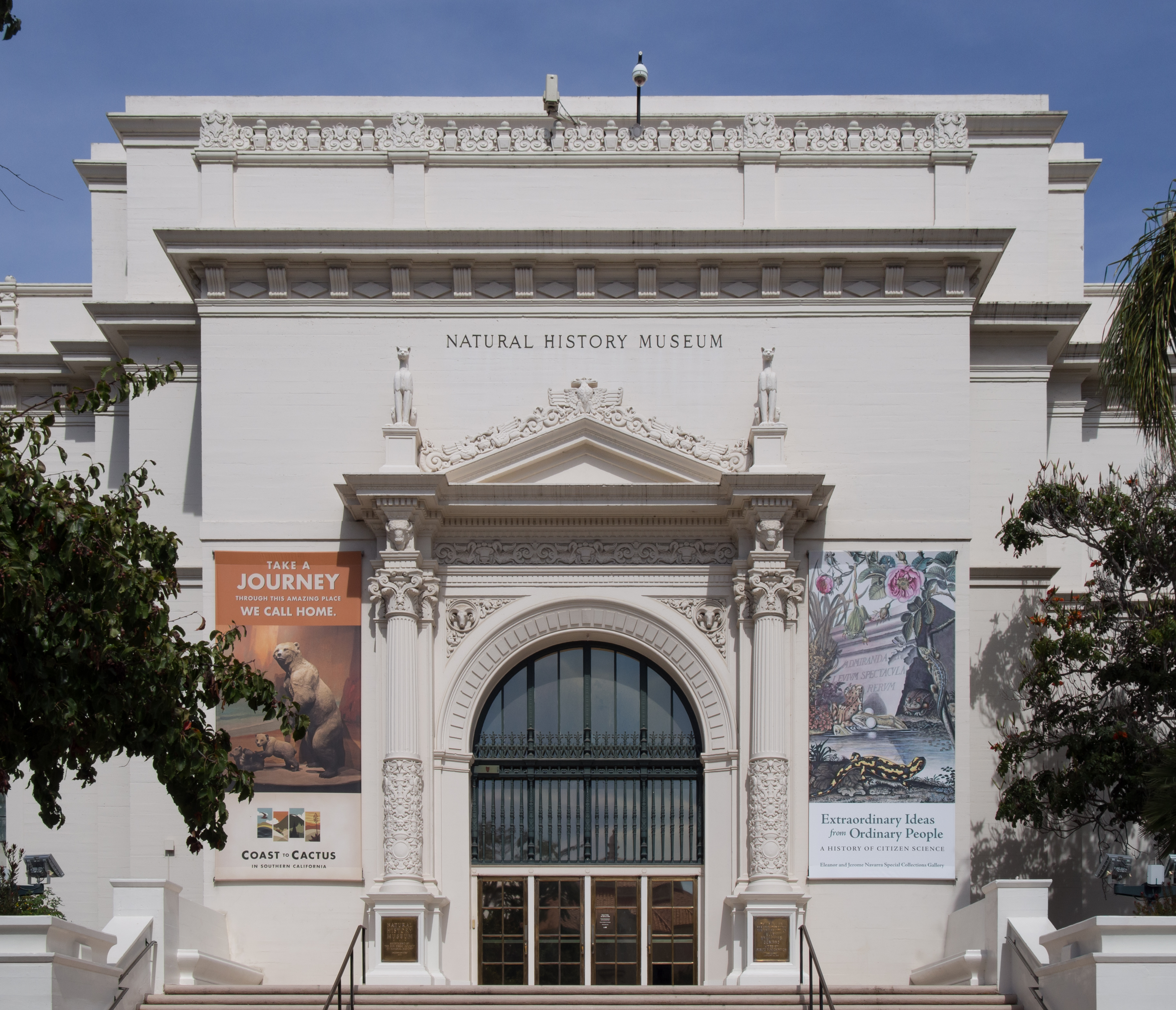
San Diego Natural History Museum

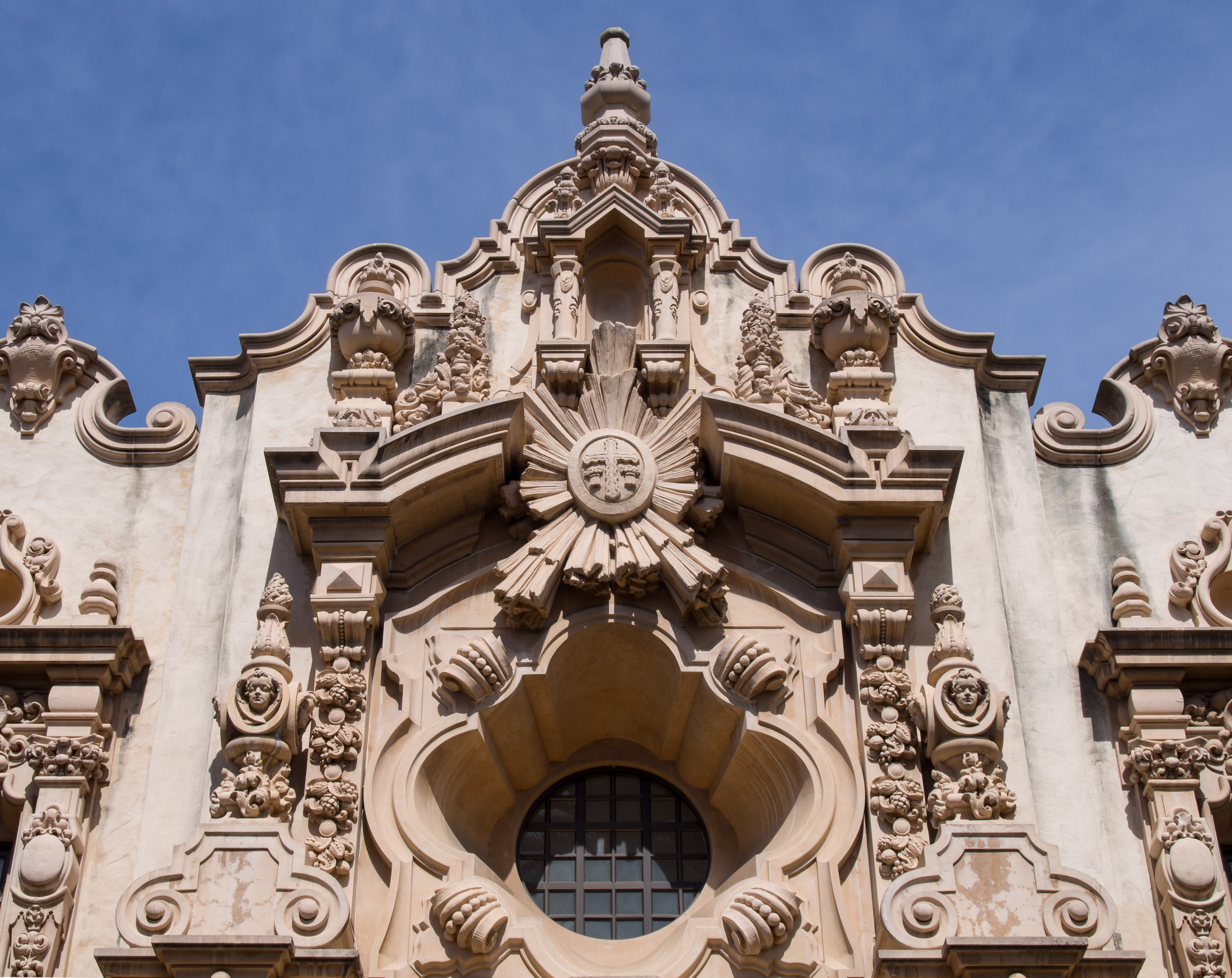
Casa del Prado architectural detail
