= Cabrillo Bridge =

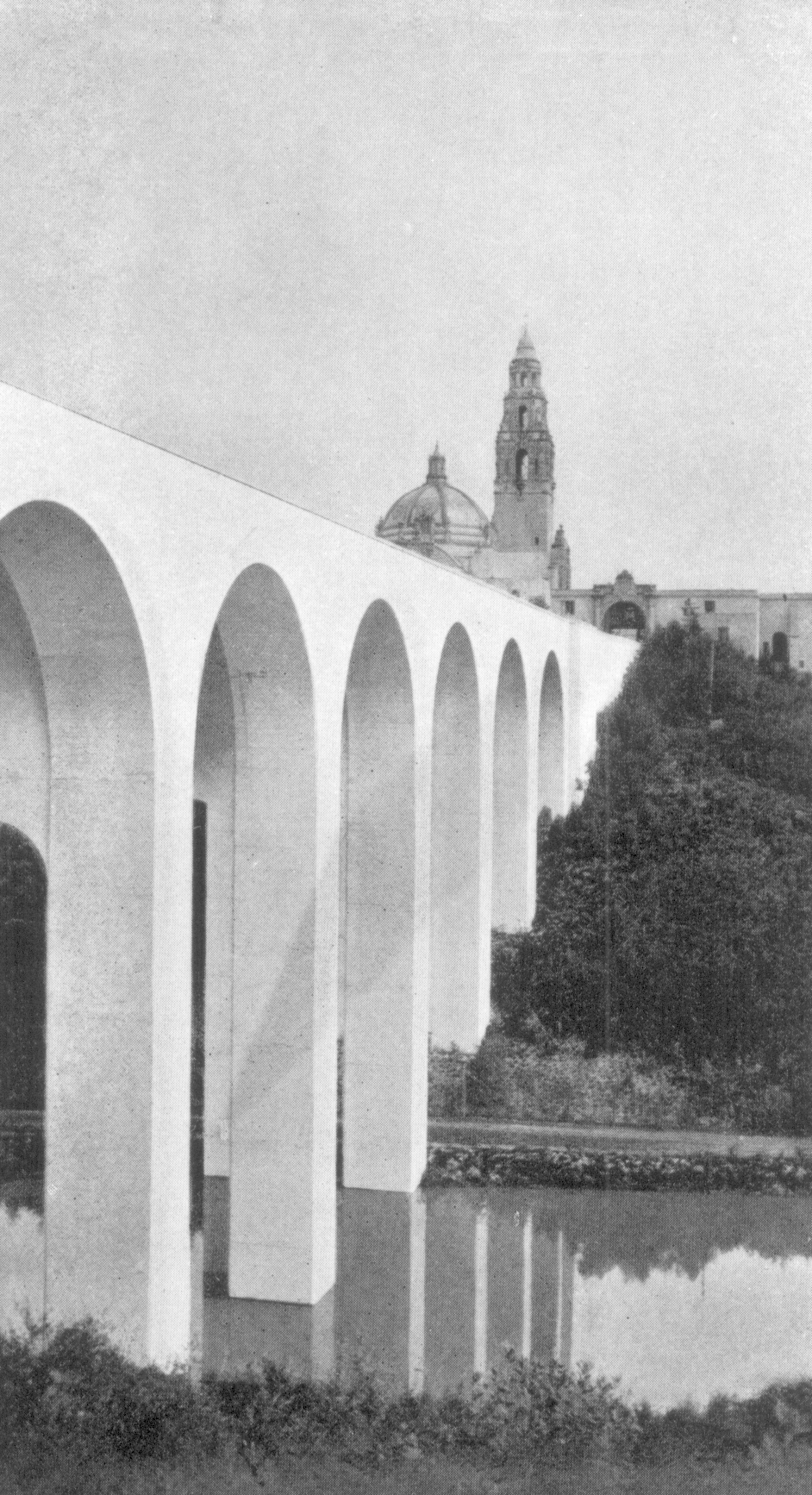
- The bridge in 1916, looking east toward Balboa Park, with pond and the "Camino Cabrillo" road underneath.
- Coordinates: 32.731412°N 117.154185°W
- Carries: El Prado
- Crosses: Cabrillo Canyon
- Locale: San Diego, California

Characteristics
- Design: Concrete, steel, wood
- Total length: approx. 450 feet (140 m)
- Height: 120 feet (37 m)

History
- Designer: Frank P. Allen Jr. Thomas B. Hunter
- Construction end: 1914
- Construction cost: $250,000 ($7,956,414 today)
- Opened: 1914

Location
- Interactive map of Cabrillo Bridge

The Cabrillo Bridge is a historic bridge in San Diego, California, providing pedestrian and light automotive access between Balboa Park and the uptown area of San Diego. It was built for the Panama–California Exposition of 1915. The bridge was nominated for the National Register of Historic Places in 1976 and was named a Local Historic Civil Engineering Landmark by the American Society of Civil Engineers in 1986.

== Location ==
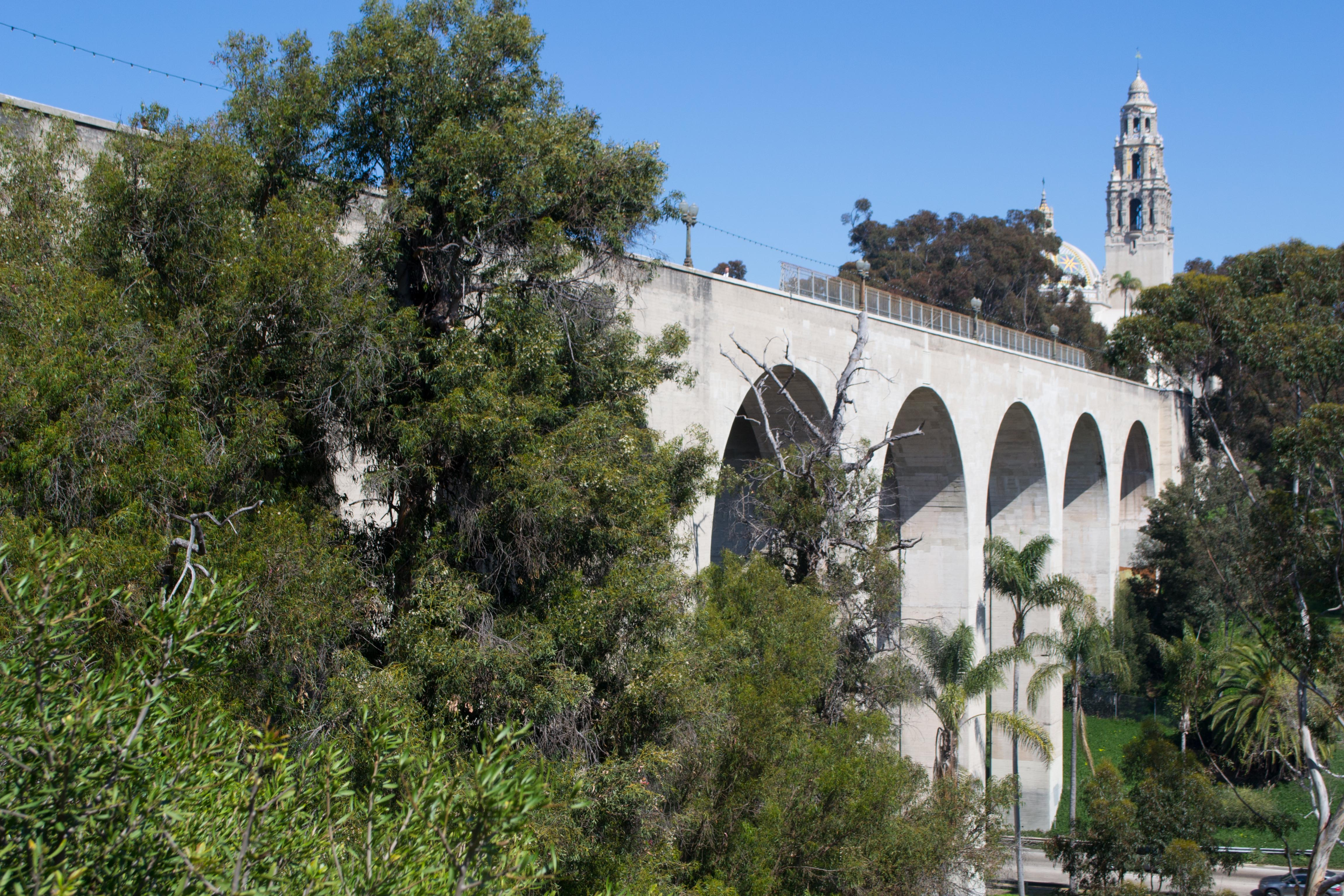
A modern view of the Cabrillo Bridge

The Cabrillo Bridge is one of several access routes to the cluster of museums located at the historic "El Prado Complex" (the former 1915 Panama Exposition site), which is east of the bridge in the middle of Balboa Park and continuing to a point near the Bea Evenson Fountain (and former trolley stop) just west of Park Boulevard.

The east–west street atop the two-lane bridge is called "El Prado". Many people mistakenly refer to the street as Laurel Street, which is a continuation of El Prado but ends at Sixth Avenue, and some refer to the bridge as the Laurel Street Bridge. Sixth Avenue forms the western boundary of Balboa Park. Laurel Street continues west from Sixth Avenue to form the southern border of San Diego International Airport, and ends at Harbor Drive on San Diego Bay.

The structure is easily seen from the scenic Cabrillo Freeway (State Route 163), which is located on the floor of the canyon below. Construction of the freeway through the canyon below the bridge was completed in February 1948. However, traffic on the bridge is not visible from the freeway due to the unusual height of the bridge (120 feet /37 meters). The height is dictated entirely by the topography of the canyon. El Prado crosses the bridge at the same level as the ground on either end of the bridge, while State Route 163 passes beneath it at approximately the level of the original canyon floor. There is no direct access route between State Route 163 and Laurel Street or El Prado.

== History ==
=== Construction ===
The bridge was built for the Panama–California Exposition of 1915. It provided the main access across Cabrillo Canyon (formerly known as Pound Canyon, which was used to hold cattle and horses in the late 19th century). An initial design for the bridge was developed by Bertram Goodhue that featured three large arches. The design was to be similar to Toledo, Spain's Alcántara Bridge. However, Frank P. Allen Jr. convinced Balboa Park commissioners to choose a cheaper design by Thomas B. Hunter of San Francisco that looked similar to other bridges in Mexico and Spain. The innovative design featured a multiple-arched cantilever structure, the first such bridge in California.

Building began in December 1912 under the supervision of Allen. The concrete forms were made of 1,000,000 board feet (2,400 m^{3}) of wood, mostly redwood. The length of the bridge is 916 feet (279 m) including approaches. The main span is 450 feet (140 m) long and 120 feet (37 m) high. The seven arches are each 56 feet (17 m) across and are supported by fourteen hollow concrete pillars. The bridge's construction cost reached $250,000 ($7,956,414 today).

=== 1915 and 1935 Expositions ===
The bridge was primarily intended as a pedestrian pathway to the 1915 Exposition. It was dedicated April 12, 1914 by Franklin D. Roosevelt, then Assistant Secretary of the Navy. Roosevelt made the inaugural automobile crossing along with the mayor of the city, Charles F. O'Neill. For the next two years, auto traffic was reserved mostly for dignitaries. Roosevelt returned in 1935, this time as President of the United States, to cross the bridge again for Balboa Park's second exposition.

=== Renovations ===
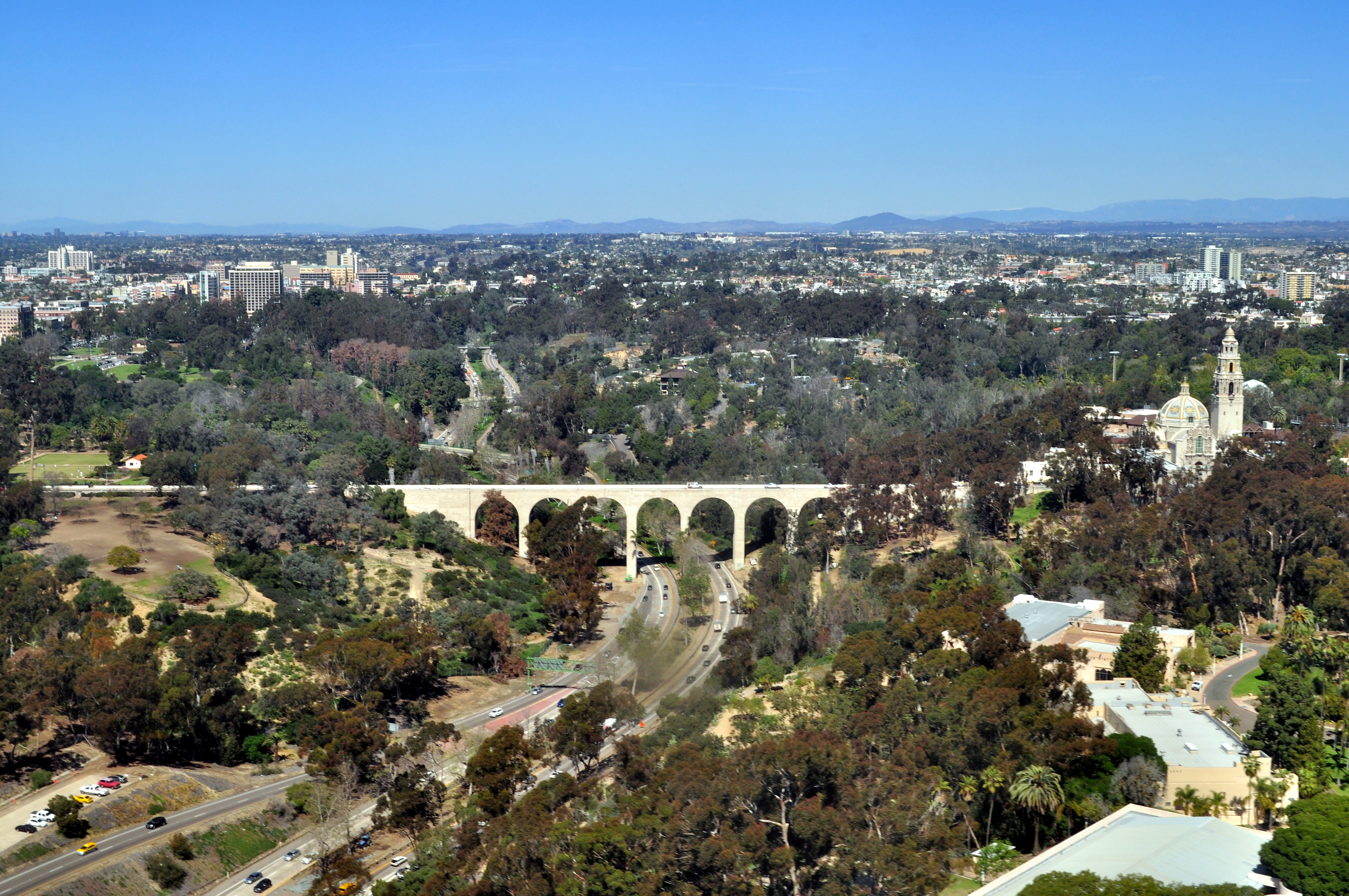
Low aerial view of Cabrillo Bridge and San Diego Museum of Us

In 2014, the bridge was closed to pedestrian and vehicle traffic to repave the road, fix sidewalks, add lights, and improve its stability during earthquakes. In June, after six months of work the planned deck renovations were completed and the bridge was re-opened for traffic. Seismic, lighting, cosmetic, and access renovations were completed in spring of 2015 with a total construction cost of approximately $23.3 million. Over 250 tradespeople worked on the project. The project received the San Diego AGC award for excellence in project management and construction for heavy/highway construction in 2015.

== Issues ==
=== Fires ===
In July 1951, a small fire ignited in the easternmost span of the bridge. Redwood timbers, used as concrete forms in the original construction, smoldered for several hours. Once put out, the blaze was quickly forgotten. But as Balboa Park historian Richard Amero noted, the fire was an "omen," and "nothing was done to reduce the likelihood of future fires."

The "future" fire erupted before dawn on June 17, 2004. Once again, aged wooden concrete forms ignited, possibly the result of arson, inside the bridge columns. The fire was difficult to reach and extinguish. Firefighters saved the structure by sawing holes in the bridge's sidewalks with jackhammers and saws to pump in foam and water. If one walks across the bridge, it is easy to sight those now repaired holes which the firefighters cut that day.

The near-disaster spurred a major rehabilitation of the Cabrillo Bridge. A one-year Caltrans project repaired broken concrete, replaced corroded steel, and finally removed most of the old wood from the original construction.

In November 2013, yet another fire burned inside the hollow bridge, again while a Caltrans-funded project was being undertaken.

=== Suicides ===
By October 1931, 17 people had "made the leap into eternity" from the bridge, said Mayor Walter Austin. One city official, after talk of installing suicide preventative measures failed, mentioned that "after a council meeting there are times a councilman might want to make use of a bridge." In 1934, a despondent sailor jumped from the bridge and splashed into the man made lagoon (Laguna de Puente) that at that time lay below. He survived, bruised but living. It was said that when the ambulance arrived, he sat at the edge of the lagoon and complained of a headache. After eight people jumped during the first six months of 1950 (and at least 50 total since its construction), city workers installed wrought iron fencing on both parapets of the bridge in June 1950. However, the suicides from the bridge did not really stop until the Coronado bridge was built.
