= Carol Williams (organist) =

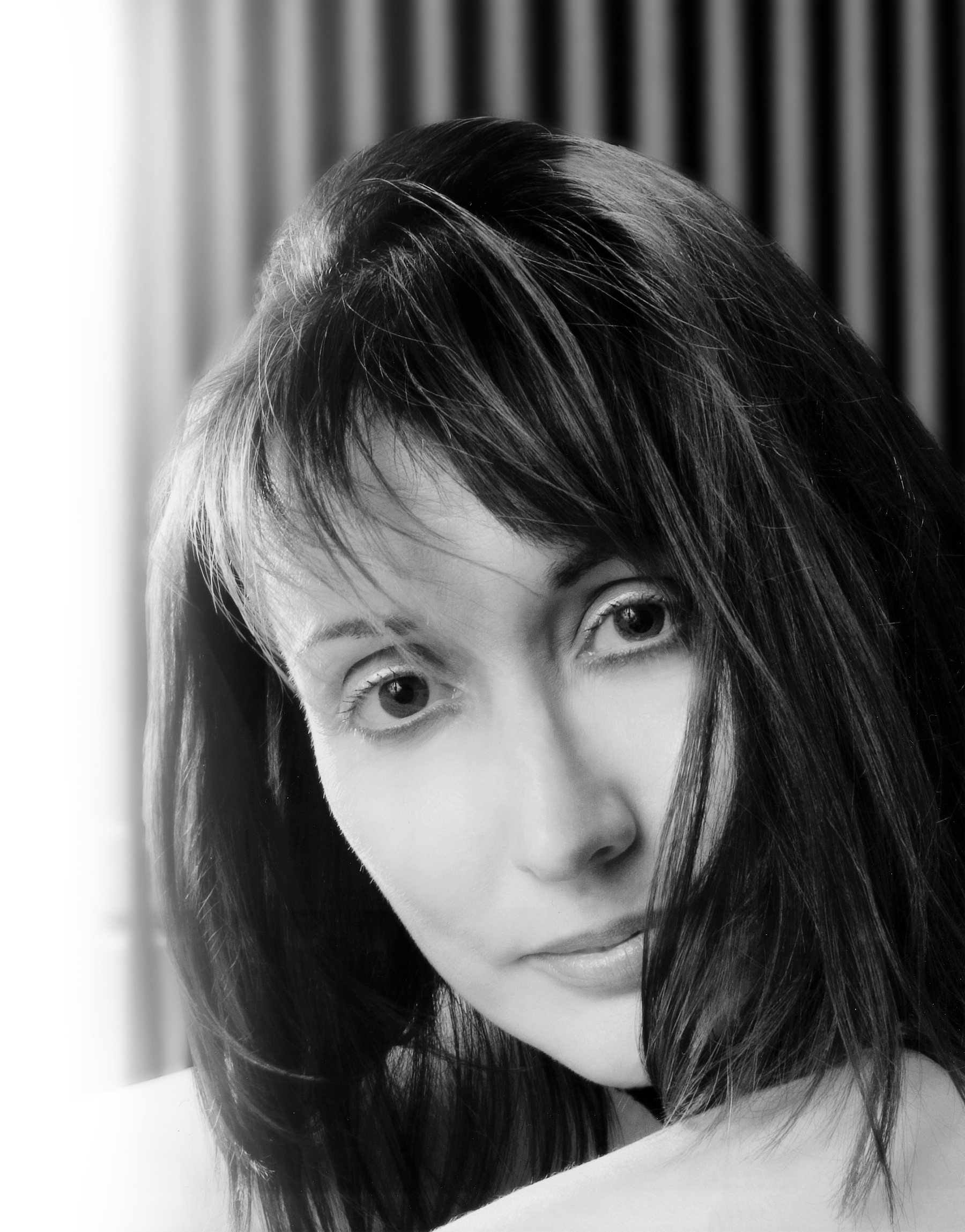
- Dr. Carol Williams

Background information
- Born: Great Britain
- Genres: Classical
- Occupations: Organist, composer
- Instrument: Pipe organ
- Years active: 1984–present
- Label: Carol Williams
- Website: http://www.melcot.com/

Carol Anne Williams D.M.A., ARAM, FRCO, FTCL, ARCM (born 1962) is a British-born international concert organist and composer, residing in America. She served from October 2001 and resigned her post in October 2016 as Civic Organist for the city of San Diego, California, performing regularly at the Spreckels Organ Pavilion. She was formerly the Artist in Residence at St. Paul's Cathedral San Diego.

Upon stepping down from her post as Civic Organist for the city of San Diego in October 2016, Williams was awarded the title of San Diego Civic Organist Emerita in recognition of her fifteen years of service. She is currently residing in her home country of Britain with her husband Kerry.

Carol Williams performing "Flight of the Bumblebee" at the West Point Cadet Chapel.

== Early life and education ==
Williams was born in Great Britain in a Welsh family with musical influences. Her formal training started with five years at the Royal Academy of Music where she specialised in the organ, performing as a student of David Sanger. She obtained the academy's Recital Diploma, together with the LRAM for both organ and piano. She was awarded all the major prizes for organ performing and, during her studies, she became a Fellow of the Royal College of Organists and a Fellow of Trinity College London, as well as an Associate of the Royal College of Music.

Williams has also studied with Daniel Roth, the Organist at the Church of St. Sulpice, Paris. Moving to the United States, Williams undertook postgraduate study at Yale University under the direction of Thomas Murray. She was appointed University Chapel Organist and was awarded an Artist Diploma (AD) together with the Charles Ives Prize for outstanding achievement. She then relocated to New York City where she became the Associate Organist at the Cathedral of the Incarnation in Long Island's Garden City. She undertook doctoral study under McNeil Robinson at the Manhattan School of Music, where she received the Helen Cohn award for her Doctor of Musical Arts (D.M.A.) degree.

== Career ==
Williams has performed around the world, including: St. Sulpice and Notre Dame, Paris; Walt Disney Concert Hall, Los Angeles; Westminster Abbey; St Paul's Cathedral; King's College, Cambridge; The Queen's College, Oxford; Salisbury Cathedral; Blenheim Palace; Woolsey Hall, Yale University; Memorial Chapel, Harvard University; St. Patrick's Cathedral, New York; Washington National Cathedral; St. Ignatius Loyola, New York; Riverside Church, New York. She has also given numerous concerts in Sweden, Finland, Estonia, Monaco, Luxembourg, the Netherlands, Poland, Germany, Denmark, Singapore, China and Russia.

Williams has been elected an Associate of the Royal Academy of Music (ARAM) in recognition of her contribution to music. A regular broadcaster in the UK and in America, she has been the guest performer with a number of leading orchestras including the BBC Concert Orchestra, San Diego Symphony Orchestra and the Beijing Symphony Orchestra. She performed the inaugural recitals on a newly installed Austin organ in Beijing's Forbidden City Concert Hall.

Williams has been interviewed on several radio programs, in which she has highlighted her 'profound love' of the organ, and she is featured in the national-awareness video Pulling out all the Stops when she was filmed in concert at St. Thomas' Church on New York's Fifth Avenue. She also took part in the Virgil Fox Memorial Concert held in the fall of 2000 at New York's Riverside Church, and a recording of the event was released.

In October 2001, Williams became the first woman in the United States to be appointed Civic Organist. She served as the San Diego Civic Organist and Artistic director of the Spreckels Organ Society in San Diego, California from 2001 to 2016. Williams performs an average of 75 concerts a year worldwide.

== Philanthropy ==
Williams performs free organ concerts a year to raise awareness and funds for various charitable organisations.
