= House of Hospitality (Balboa Park) =

Building in San Diego, California, U.S.

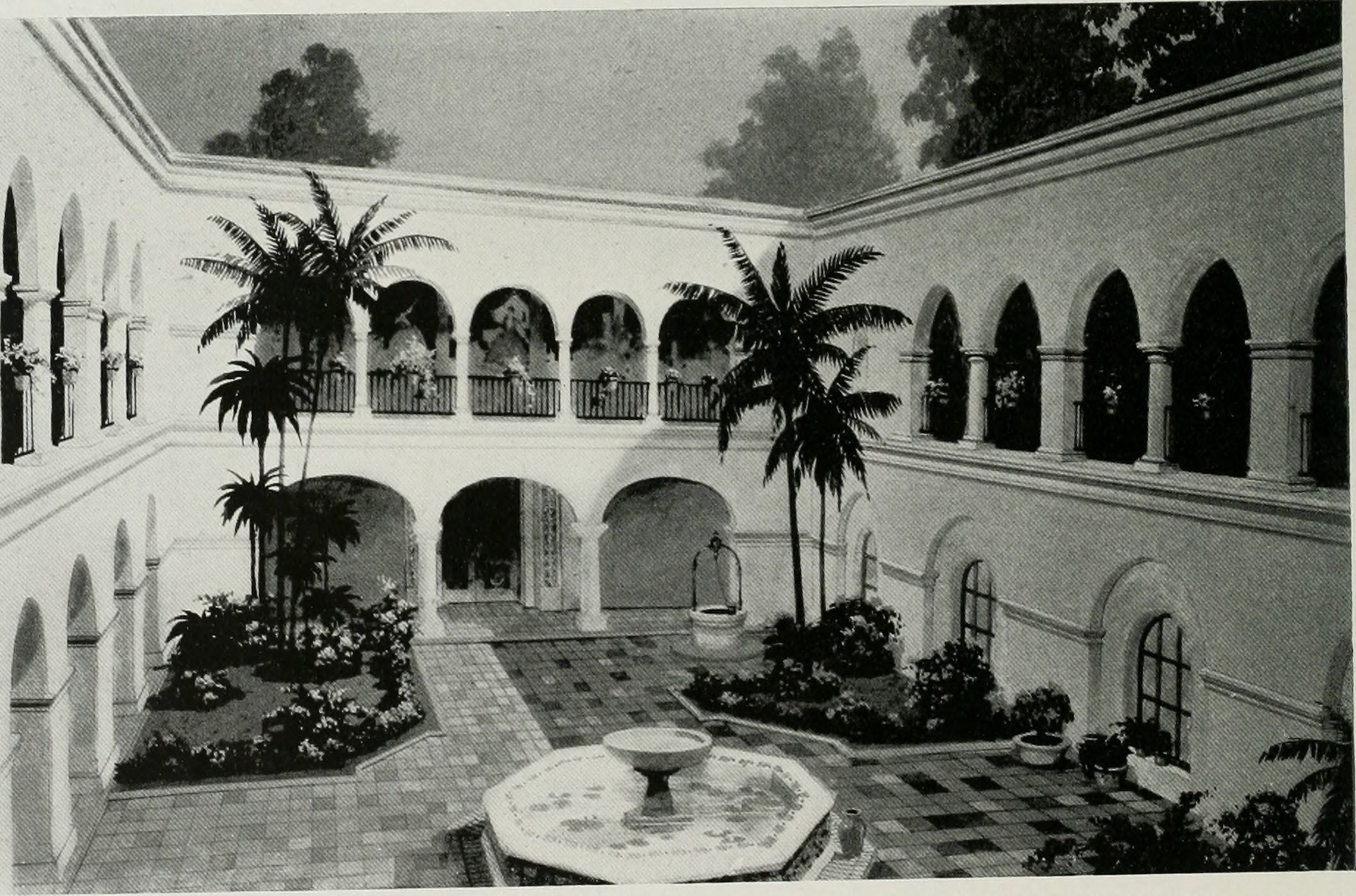
- Patio, House of Hospitality, California Pacific International Exposition, San Diego (1934)
- Interactive map of the House of Hospitality area

General information
- Location: San Diego, California, United States
- Coordinates: 32°43′52″N 117°8′58″W

The House of Hospitality is a building in Balboa Park in San Diego, California. It was originally built for the Panama–California Exposition (1915) as the Foreign Arts Building.

Intended to be temporary, it was changed to the House of Hospitality for the California Pacific International Exposition (1935). The building was demolished in the 1990s for structural reasons and later reconstructed using the original building as a model. It is currently home to the Balboa Park Visitors Center, the offices of the Balboa Park Conservancy, and offices for organizations operating in the park.

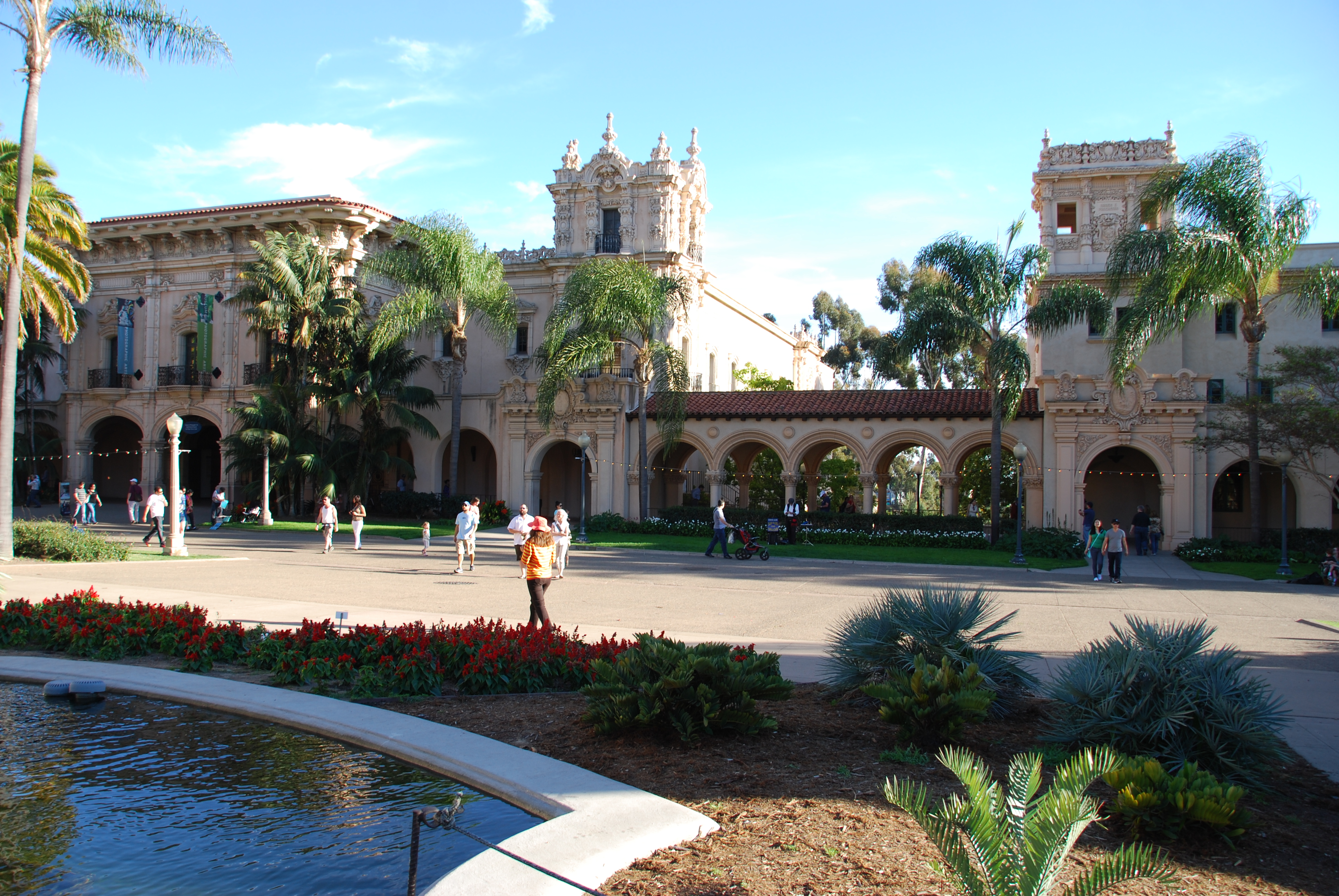
The building in 2014

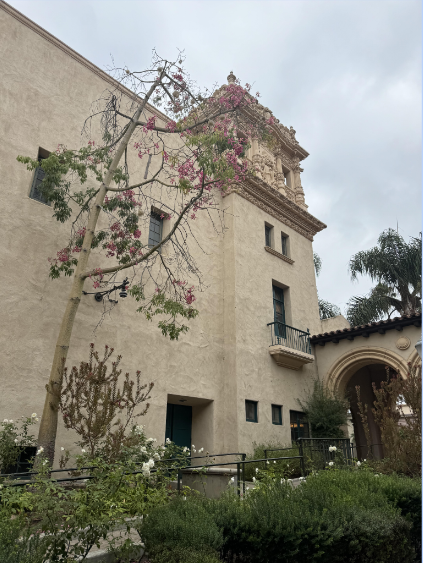
Exterior of House of Hospitality, 2024

== See also ==
- El Prado Complex
- Woman of Tehuantepec (sculpture)
