= Museum of Us =

- Location within San Diego Location within California Location within the United States
- Established: 1915
- Location: California Quadrangle; 1350 El Prado, Balboa Park; San Diego, California, United States
- Coordinates: 32.7317°N 117.1524°W
- Type: Anthropological museum
- Visitors: 220,000 annually
- Directors: Micah D. Parzen, CEO
- Website: museumofus.org

The Museum of Us is a museum of anthropology located in Balboa Park in San Diego, California. The museum is housed in the historic landmark buildings of the California Quadrangle.

== History ==
The museum traces its starting point to the Panama–California Exposition, which opened in 1915 on the occasion of the inauguration of the Panama Canal. The central exhibit of the exposition, "The Story of Man through the Ages," was assembled under archaeologist Dr. Edgar Lee Hewett of the School of American Archaeology (later renamed the School of American Research and since 2007 the School for Advanced Research). Hewett organized expeditions to gather pre-Columbian pottery from the American Southwest and to Guatemala for objects and reproductions of Mayan civilization monuments. Materials were gathered from expeditions sent by anthropologist Aleš Hrdlička of the Smithsonian Institution, who gathered casts and specimens from Africa, Siberia, Alaska, and Southeast Asia. Osteological remains and trepanated crania from Peruvian sites were also obtained.

A group of citizens led by George Marston formed the San Diego Museum Association to retain the collection and convert it into a permanent museum, with Dr. Hewett as the first director. Notable additions to the museum's collection after the exposition included the Jessop Weapons Collection and a rare collection of artifacts from the ancient Egyptian city of Amarna, donated by Ellen Browning Scripps and the Egypt Exploration Society.

Between 1935 and 1936, the museum's name briefly changed to the Palace of Science to correspond with the California Pacific International Exposition. During this exposition, the museum housed special exhibitions from a variety of sources, such as the Monte Alban exhibit, which featured many artifacts on loan from the Mexican government.

In 1942, the museum underwent a name change to the Museum of Man, reflecting its commitment to anthropological pursuits. The addition of "San Diego" occurred in 1978. During World War II, the museum underwent conversion into a hospital, necessitating the temporary storage of its exhibits and collections. Post-war, the institution shifted its focus to the people of the Western Americas, eventually leading to significant growth in its collections from the 1980s through the early 1990s. Currently, the museum's holdings comprise nearly two million objects.

The museum is housed in four original buildings from the 1915 Exposition. These include the California Quadrangle, which was designed for the Exposition by American architect Bertram G. Goodhue, and the California Tower, one of the key landmarks in San Diego. The Quadrangle and Tower are listed on the National Register of Historic Places. The exterior sculpture on the building was created by the Piccirilli Brothers.

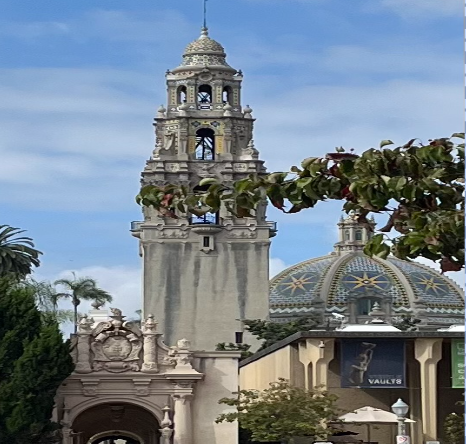
California Tower In Balboa Park

The main museum is housed in the California Building with its landmark tower. The tower, which had been closed to the public for nearly 80 years, reopened in time for the 2015 centennial of the Panama–California Exposition. The tower contains a carillon and quarterly-hour chimes which can be heard all over Balboa Park.

The museum also occupies three other original 1915 buildings. Administrative offices and an auditorium are housed in the Gill Administration Building, west of the museum. Originally known as the Balboa Park Administration Building, it was built in 1911 and designed by architect Irving Gill. It was the first building erected in Balboa Park. On the opposite (south) side of the California Quadrangle, housed in what was originally the Fine Arts Building, is Evernham Hall, a banquet room that is also used for temporary exhibits. Immediately adjacent is Saint Francis Chapel, a non-denominational Spanish-style chapel available for private events.

On August 2, 2020, after a several-year process and during a wave of name changes made by institutions all over the world after the murder of George Floyd, the museum officially changed its name to the Museum of Us to be in the spirit of inclusiveness and decolonization.

== Collections ==
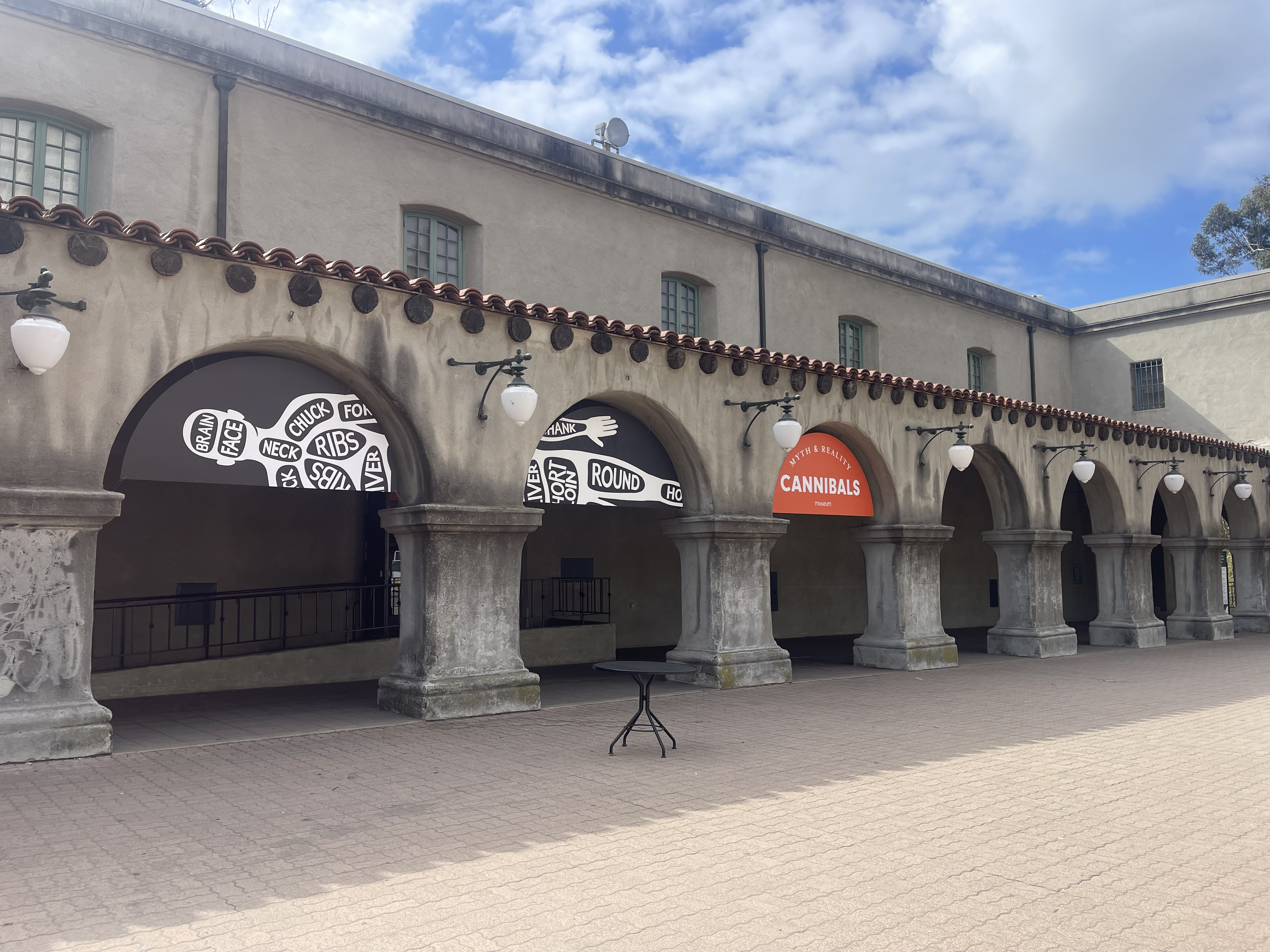
Entrance to the Cannibals: Myth & Reality Museum at Balboa Park, 2024

The museum's cultural resources and permanent exhibits focus on the pre-Columbian history of the western Americas, with materials drawn from Native American cultures of the Southern California region, particularly the Kumeyaay in collaboration with Mat'taam Naka Shin (San Diego-Panama Exposition Centennial Intertribal Committee); as well as, Mesoamerican civilizations, such as the Maya. The museum also holds a collection of Ancient Egyptian antiquities, including burial masks, figurines, and seven painted wooden coffins; one piece is a Ptolemaic child's coffin—only six others are known to exist worldwide. The total holdings include more than 100,000 documented ethnographic items, 300,000 archaeological items, and 25,000 photographic images.

== In popular culture ==
The California Building and its tower were used by Orson Welles as the principal features of the fictitious Xanadu estate in the classic film Citizen Kane.
