= Spreckels Organ Pavilion =

Coordinates: 32.729391°N 117.150452°W

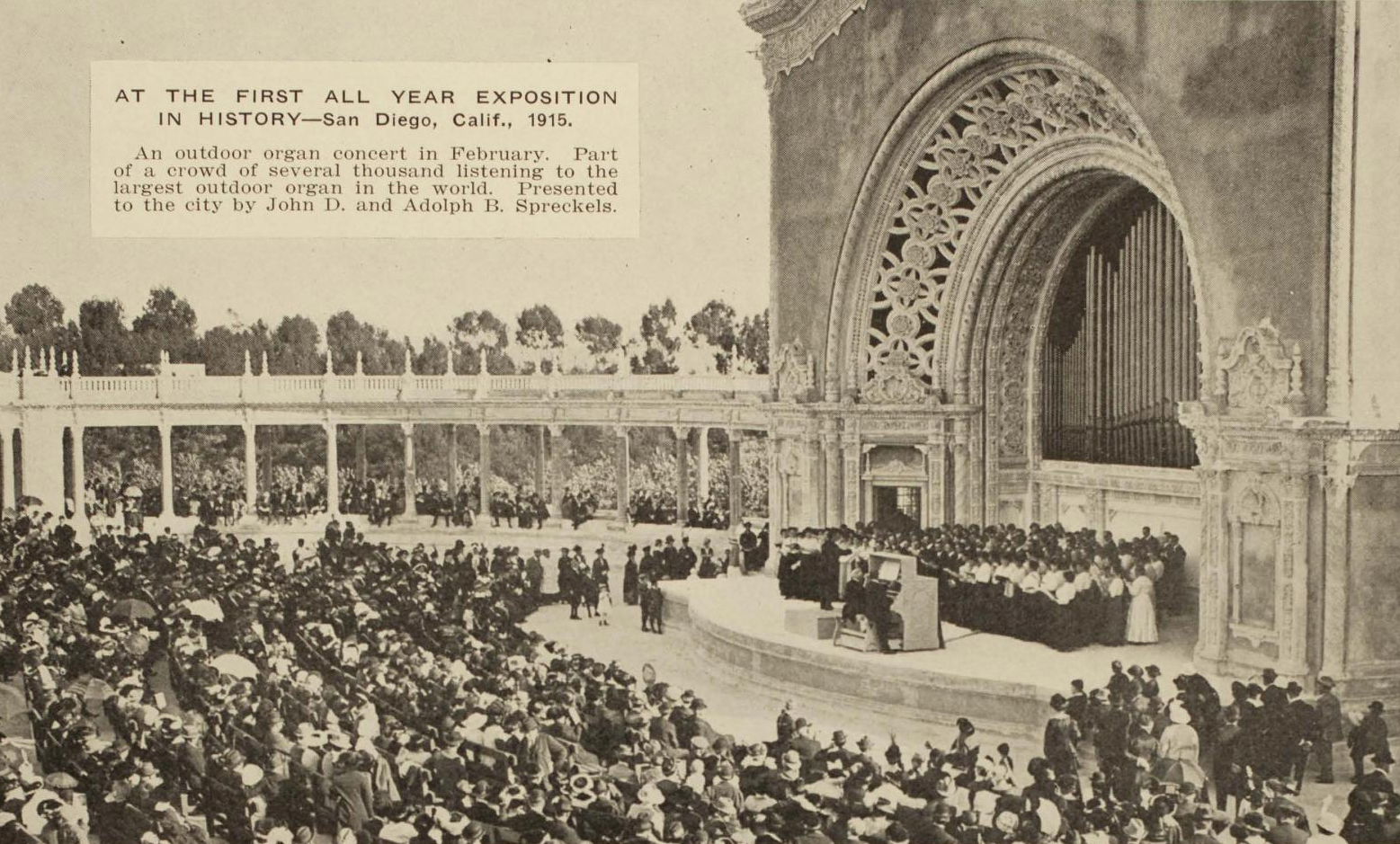
- Organ concert at the pavilion, February 1915

General information
- Type: Pipe organ
- Location: Balboa Park, San Diego, California, 1549 El Prado #10; San Diego, CA 92101
- Construction started: 1914
- Completed: 1914
- Opened: December 31, 1914
- Cost: Organ: $33,500 ($1,076,786 today); Pavilion: $66,500 ($2,137,500 today)

Height
- Height: 75 feet (23 m)

Design and construction
- Architect: Harrison Albright
- Main contractor: Wurster Construction Company

Other information
- Seating type: Metal benches
- Seating capacity: 2,500

Website
- http://spreckelsorgan.org/

The Spreckels Organ Pavilion is an outdoor venue that houses the open-air Spreckels Organ in Balboa Park in San Diego, California. With more than 5,000 pipes, the Spreckels Organ is the world's largest pipe organ in a fully outdoor venue. Constructed for the 1915 Panama–California Exposition, it is located at the corner of President's Way and Pan American Road East in the park.

== History ==
John D. Spreckels, son of sugar magnate Claus Spreckels, was one of the wealthiest residents in San Diego County. John D. Spreckels, the creator of the Spreckels organ pavilion, gifted the organ and the building to the city of San Diego. When it was given to the city, it was said it would be used for free entertainment for the people. John D. Spreckels invested in or owned many places such as the Hotel del Coronado, and the San Diego Union-Tribune. John D. Spreckels was called an economic survivor, mostly due to the investments he had made and the potential they had to skyrocket. He supported the Panama–California Exposition, and during its construction, he and his brother Adolph B. Spreckels gave the organ pavilion as a gift to "the people of San Diego" and "the people of all the world" on December 31, 1914. They donated $33,500 ($1,076,786 today) for the organ and $66,500 ($2,137,500 today) for the pavilion. After Spreckels' announcement, a local orchestra performed Jacques Offenbach's Orpheus in the Underworld, which was then followed by a 250-person chorus that sang pieces from Joseph Haydn's oratorio, The Creation.

On July 27, 1915, former president Theodore Roosevelt gave a speech at the organ pavilion in front of nearly 19,000 people. He touched on topics about world peace and his desire for the United States to maintain a minimum of 200,000 military members. He also requested that San Diegans permanently keep the temporary buildings set up for the exposition. Former president William Howard Taft also spoke at the pavilion to over 7,000 people on September 16, 1915. Taft commended the city on the architecture used for the exposition buildings.

John D. Spreckels also donated the services of renowned organist Humphrey John Stewart for the two-year run of the exposition. After the exposition, Spreckels extended Stewart's contract. When Spreckels died in 1926, the pavilion was used for his memorial service.

The U.S. Navy borrowed Balboa Park during World War II, and no organ concerts were played during 1942–1948. During the 1970s and 1980s, the pavilion fell into disuse and risked being demolished. Around $1.1 million were raised for repairs by the early 1980s from the city and a local nonprofit.

== Design ==
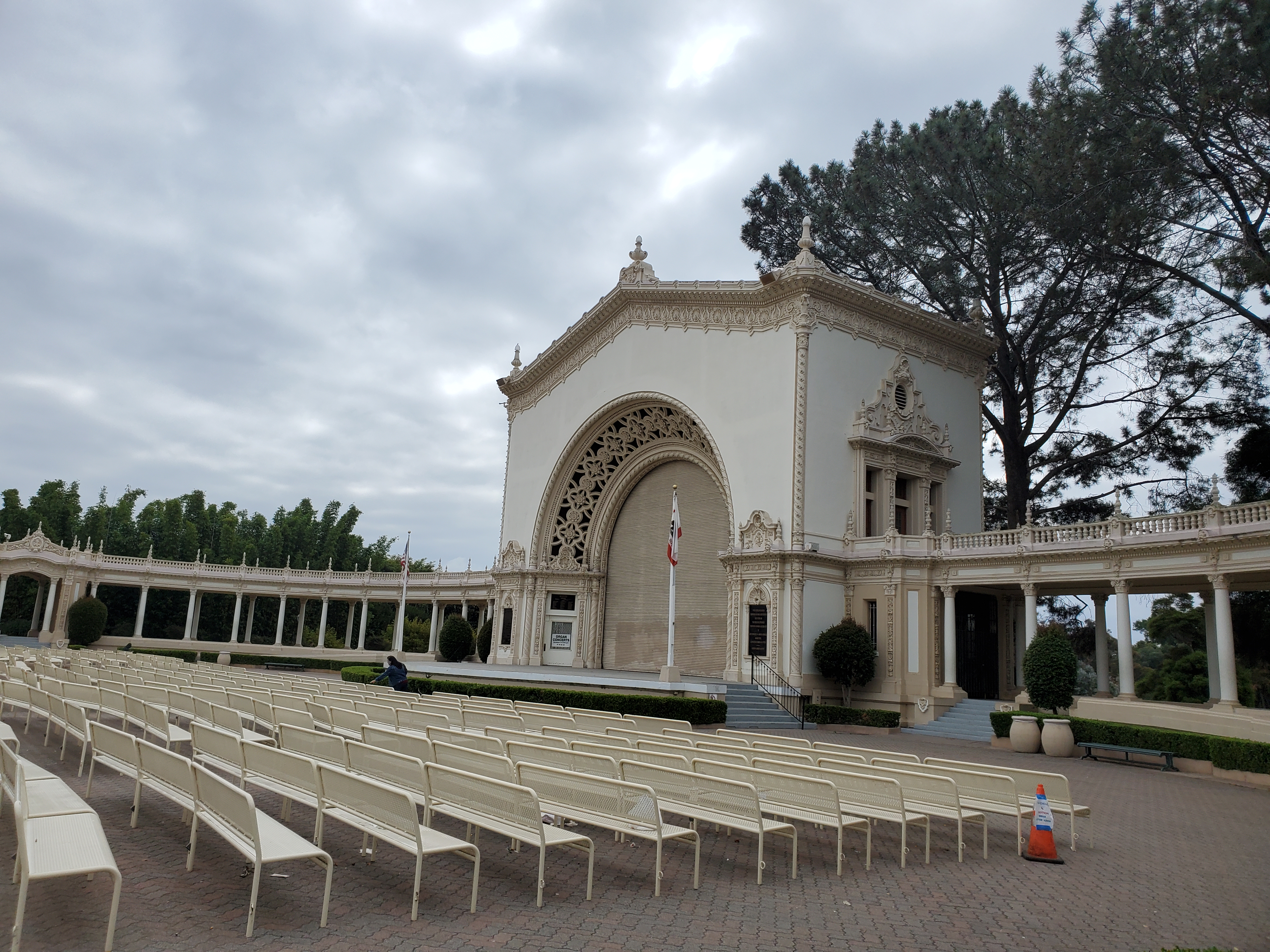
Spreckels Organ Pavilion

Initially, Bertram Goodhue's plans for Balboa Park for the Panama-California Exposition included a music pavilion that would be located north of Plaza de Panama. After Brazil decided not to participate with a building in the exposition, the pavilion was built at its site, instead. Spreckels chose Harrison Albright to design the organ pavilion. Albright was a self-taught Los Angeles architect, who previously designed the U.S. Grant Hotel in downtown San Diego. The semicircular pavilion was built by the F. Wurster Construction Company in an ornate Italian-Renaissance design.

The organ was built by Austin Organs, Inc. as their Opus #453. In 1915, it had 48 ranks or 3,400 pipes, in five divisions, ranging in size from 32 feet (9.8 m) down to small pipes that were about the size of a pencil. The console had four manuals, and a pedal keyboard. The electrically powered blower had 20 horsepower, and was situated two floors below the pipes. Working pipes were located behind gilded pipes, most of which (apart from 15) were mute.

Today, it has 80 ranks totaling 5,017 pipes and faces north to protect the pipes from the sunlight. The audience, therefore, faces south. Commercial airplane landings at San Diego International Airport occasionally compete with the organ's sound.

During the 1935 California Pacific International Exposition, the stage size was doubled and a fountain was added. The fountain can be lit at night and is modeled after one in Chapultepec Park in Mexico City. In 1981, the pavilion was restored, and in 2002, the organ was expanded from 3,400 to 4,518 pipes. In 2015, the organ was expanded to 80 ranks and 5,017 pipes. San Diego's Spreckels Organ is now the world's largest pipe organ in a fully outdoor venue, although western New York has the larger Massey Memorial Organ in an open-air auditorium with a roof.

== Concerts and events ==
Spreckels Organ, Balboa Park, during Sunday Concert, 2026

Free organ concerts are given in Balboa Park at 2:00 pm each Sunday afternoon, sponsored by San Diego Parks and Recreation Department, the Spreckels Organ Society, and private donations.

On Monday evenings at 7:30 p.m. during the summer, The Spreckels Summer International Organ Festival is presented by the Spreckels Organ Society. Concerts include a silent movie with organ accompaniment, similar to the original orchestral performance that would have been heard in theaters during that time.

During the summer on Tuesdays, Wednesdays, and Thursdays, "Twilight in the Park" provides mixed popular concerts.

The annual December Nights celebration is performed on the Spreckels stage. The San Diego Community Christmas Center displays nativity scenes in the pavilion during the Christmas season.

Numerous high school and college graduations are also held at the organ pavilion.

On August 31, 2014, Drive Like Jehu reunited for a performance at the pavilion, accompanied by civic organist Carol Williams. The collaboration was facilitated by the Spreckels Organ Society board of directors. The novelty of playing with the accompaniment of the organ was a key factor in bringing the band back together.

== Civic Organists of San Diego ==
- Humphrey John Stewart 1914–1932
- Royal Albert Brown 1932–1954
- Charles Rollins Shatto 1954–1957
- Douglas Ian Duncan 1957–1978
- Jared Jacobsen 1978–1984
- Robert Plimpton 1985–2001
- Carol Williams 2001–2016 (San Diego Civic Organist Emerita).
- Raúl Prieto Ramírez 2018–Present

== Organ Curators ==
- Edward Crome 1914 (Installer)
- Anton Rokos 1915–1916 (Curator)
- Roy W. Tolchard 1916–1932
- Edwin A. Spencer 1932–1947
- Leonard L. Dowling 1947–1974
- Lyle Blackinton 1974–2014
- Dale Sorenson 2015-present

== Gallery ==
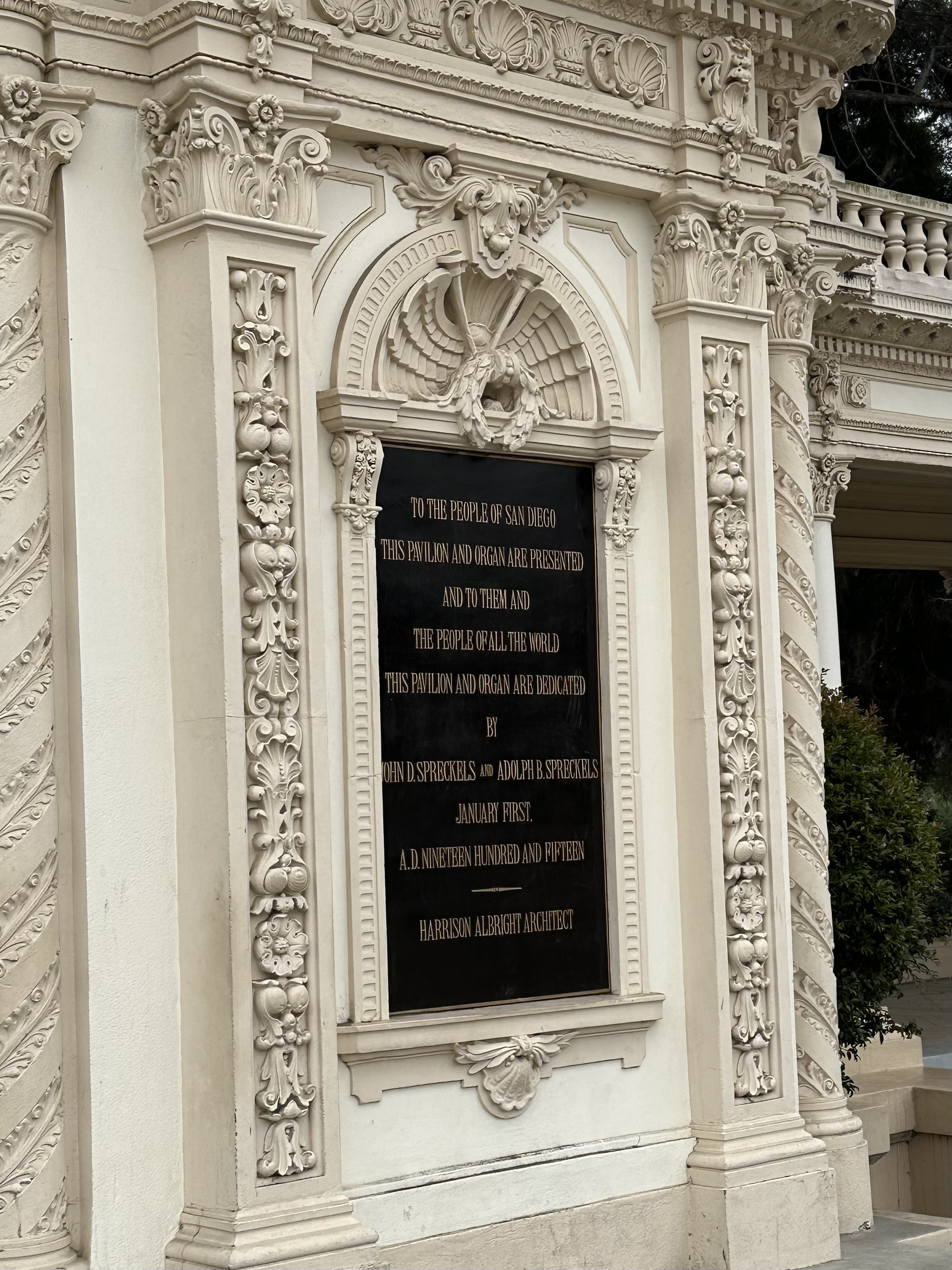
Plaque of Spreckels Organ Pavilion dedication, 2024

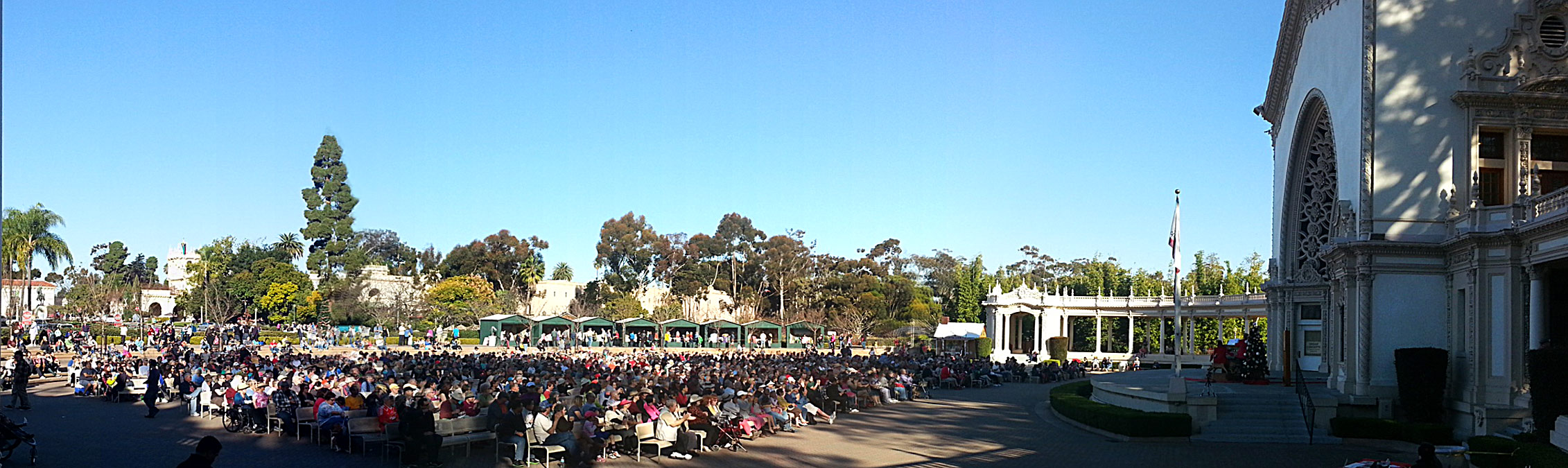
A Sunday afternoon concert with Carol Williams in December 2013. Nativity scene displays are present in the background in the small green sheds

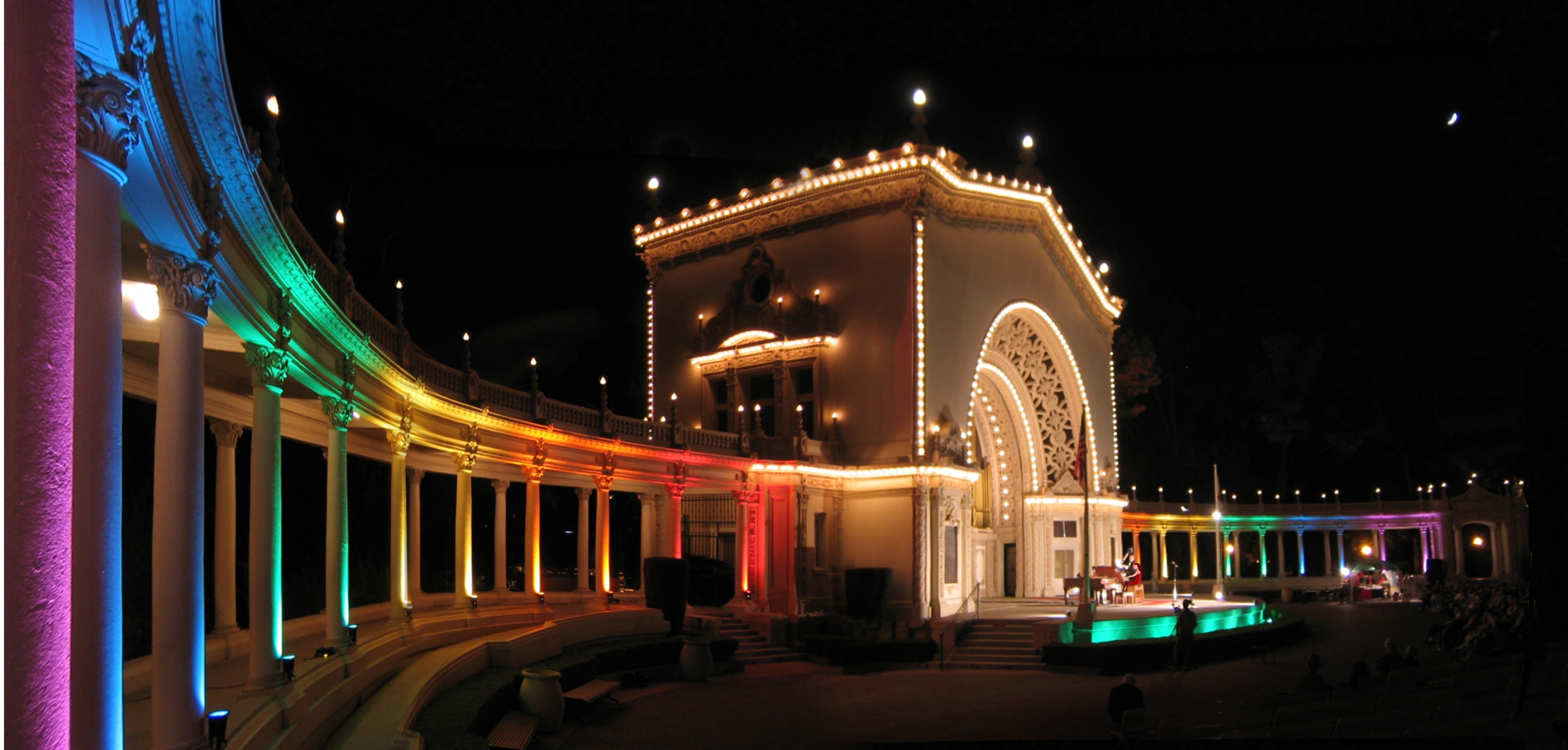
A Monday evening concert in 2008

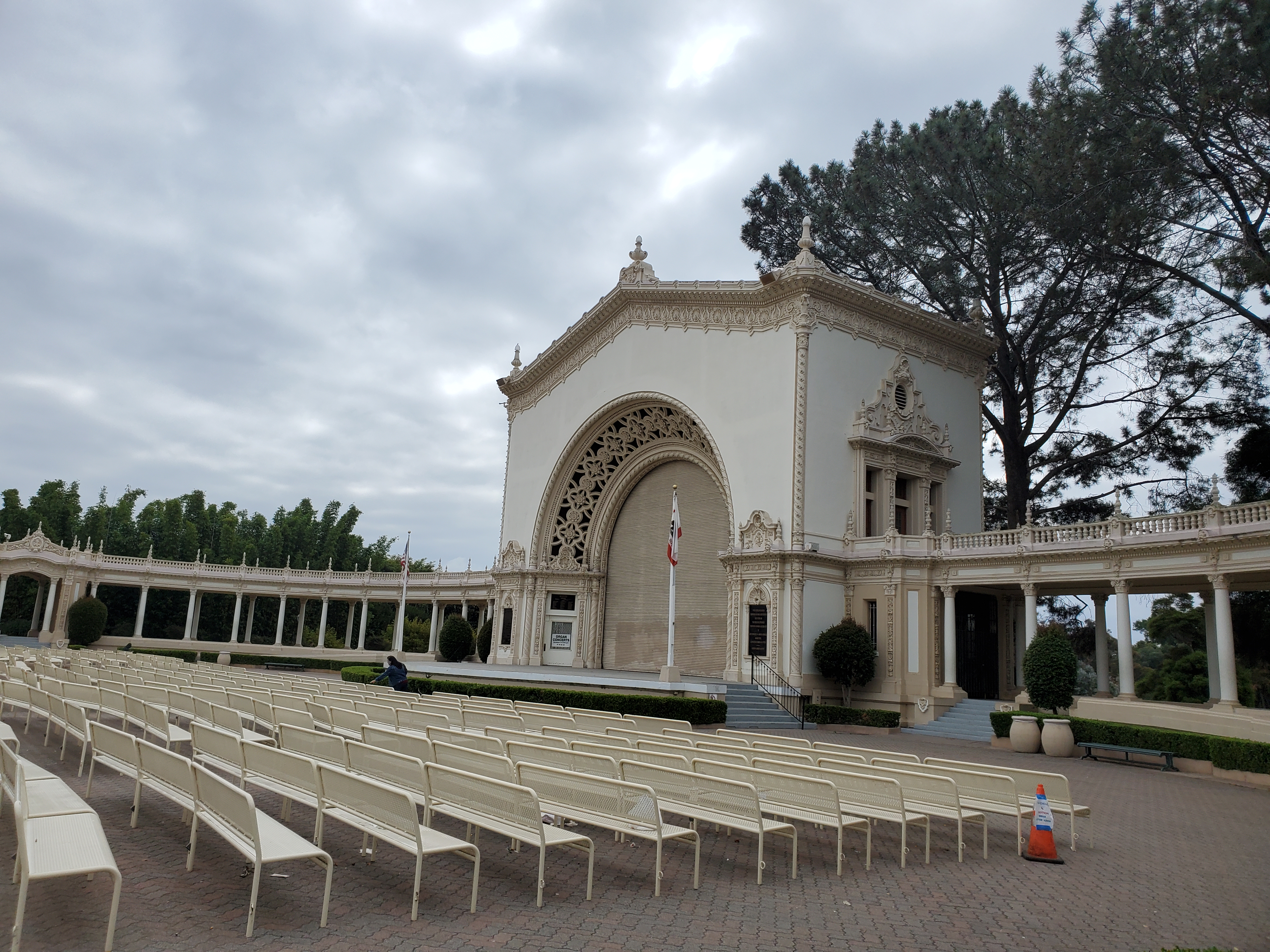
Balboa Park Organ Pavilion main stage and seats 2024

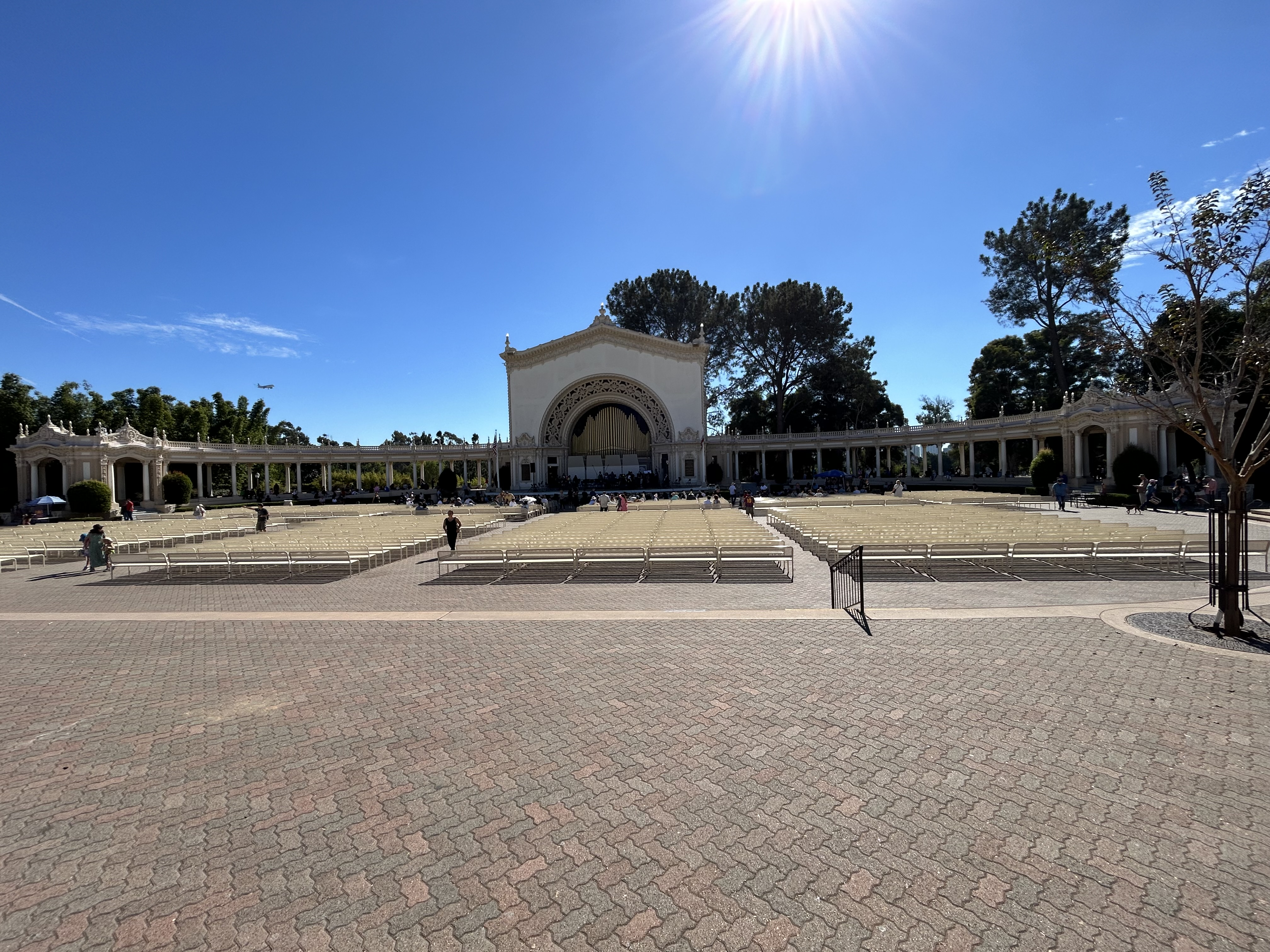
Wide Angle from inside the Pavilion, 2024

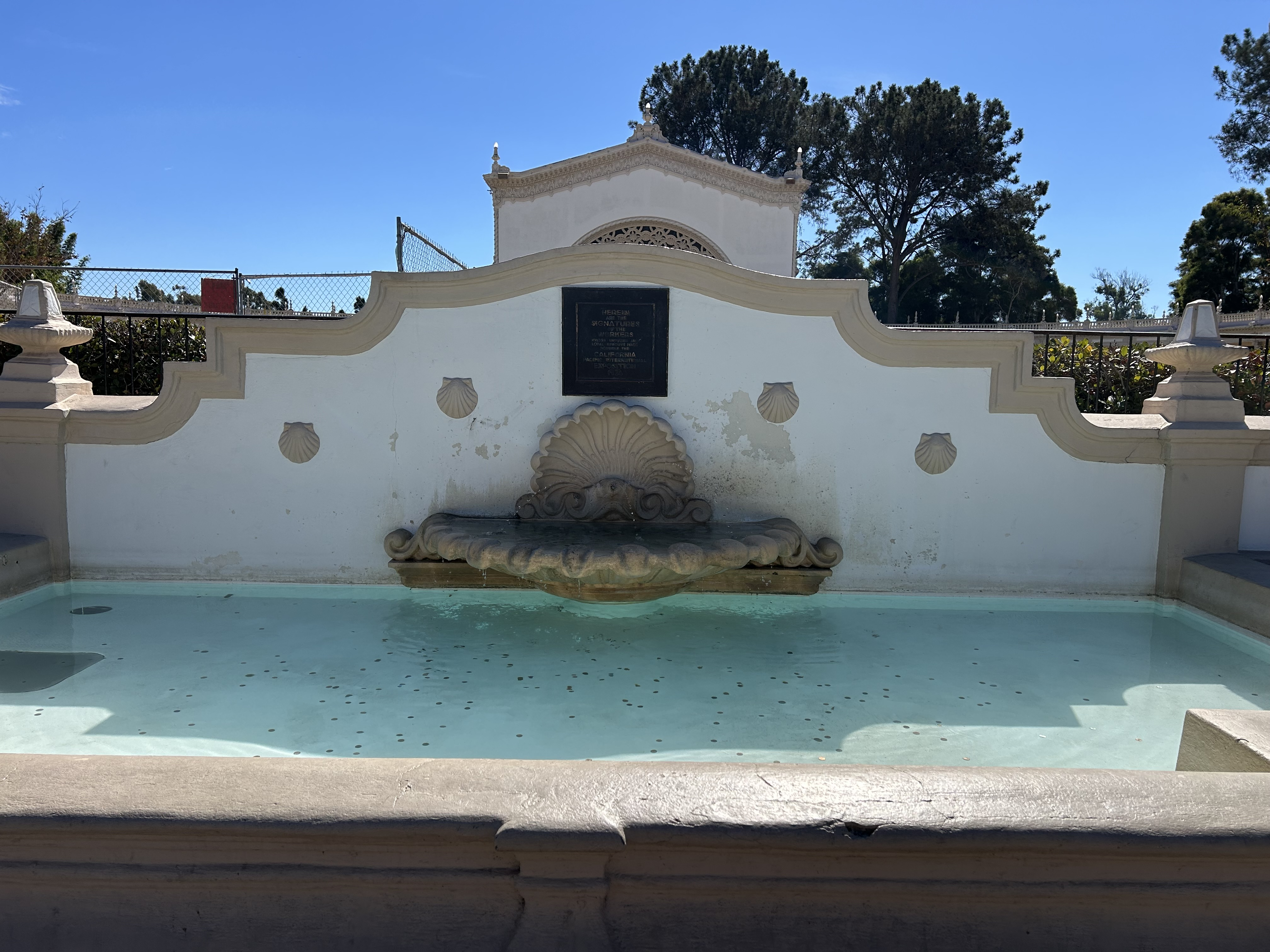
Fountain dedicated to the 1936 Exposition workers

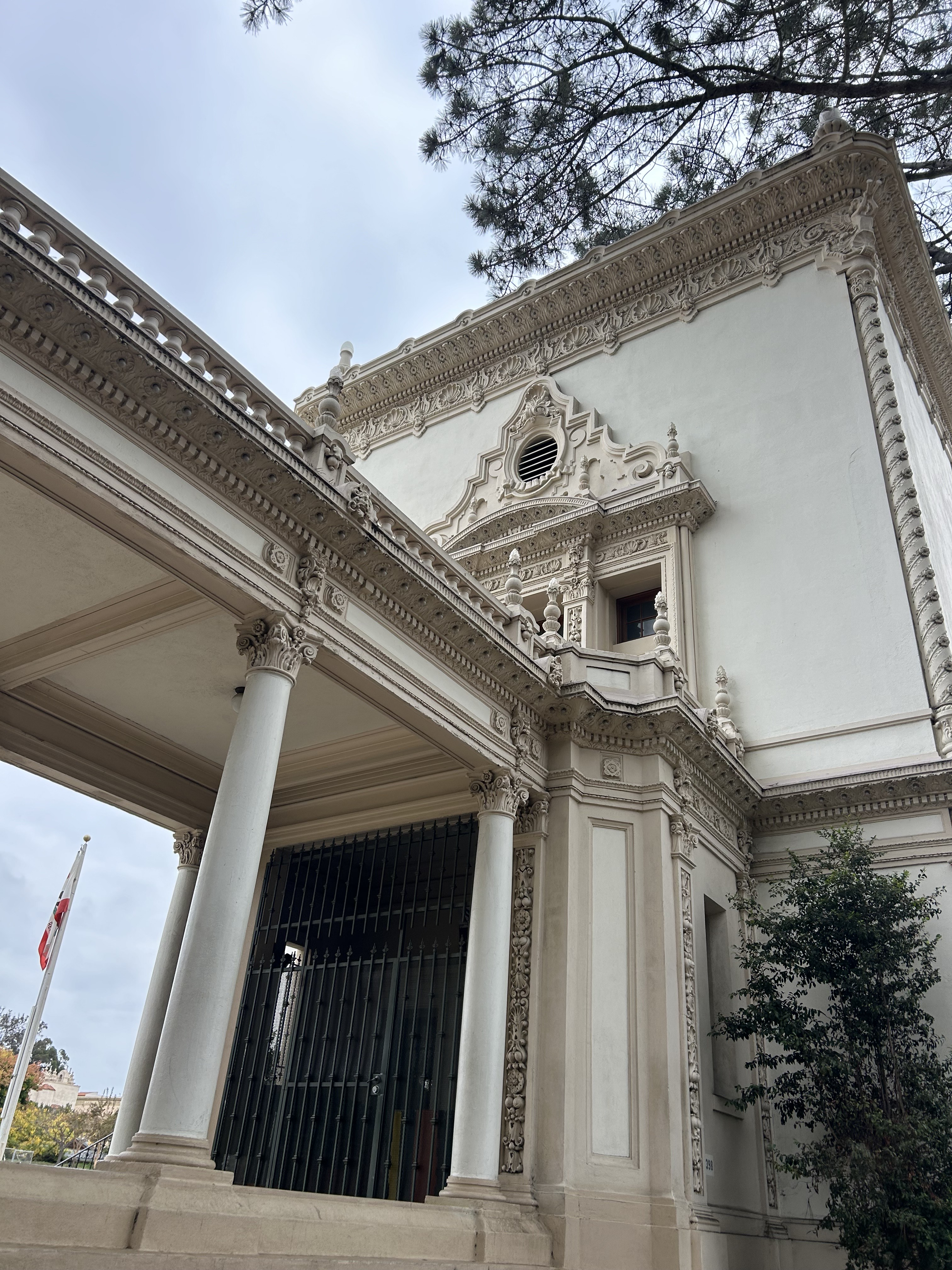
Side entrance to the main building housing the organ pipes.

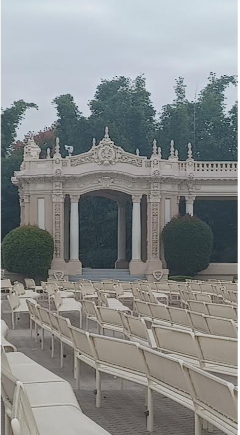
Terminal pavilion at end of colonnade.
