= Plaza de Panama =

Plaza in San Diego, California, U.S.

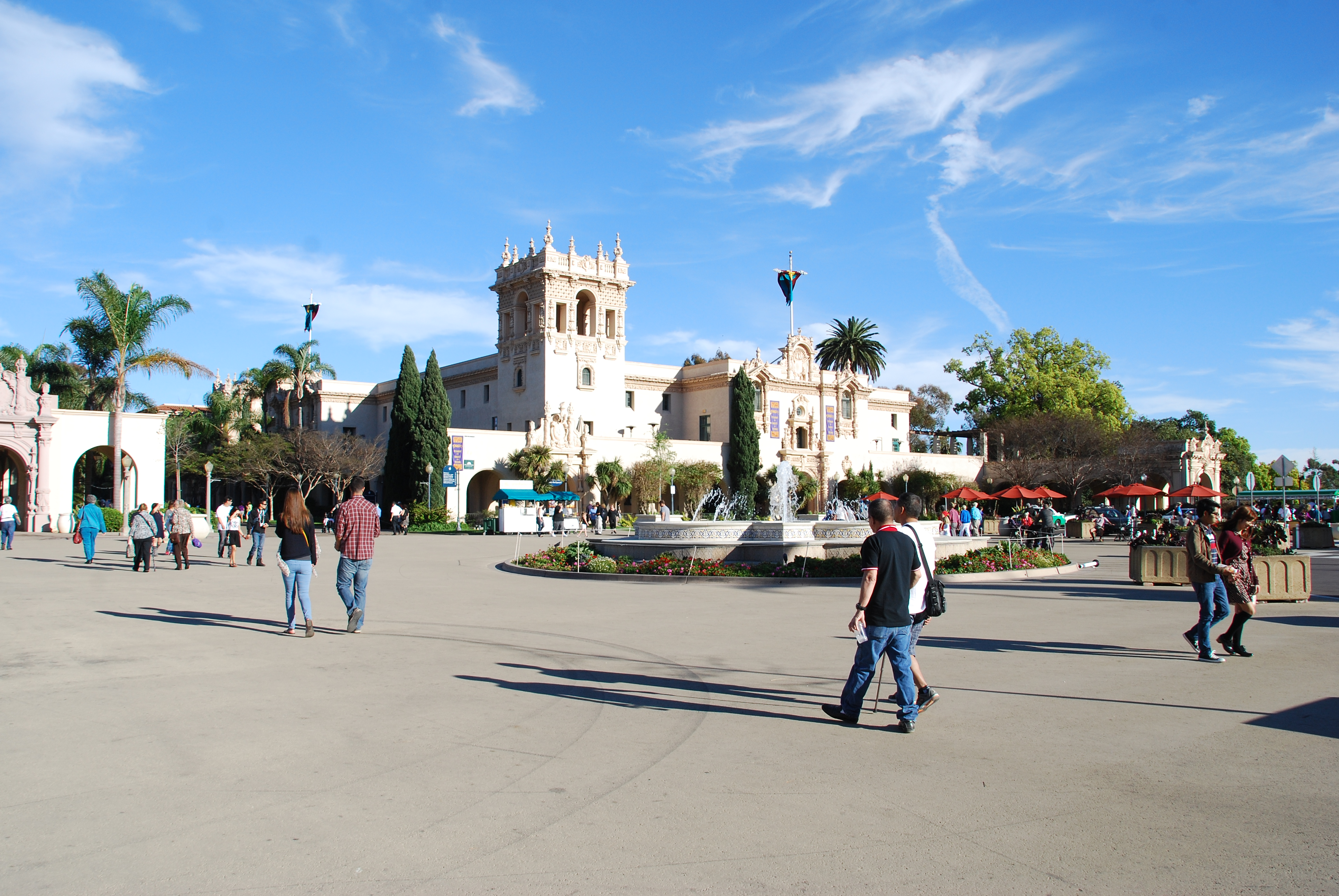
- The plaza in 2014

- Location within California
- Coordinates: 32°43′54″N 117°9′1″W

Plaza de Panama is a plaza in Balboa Park's El Prado Complex in San Diego, California.

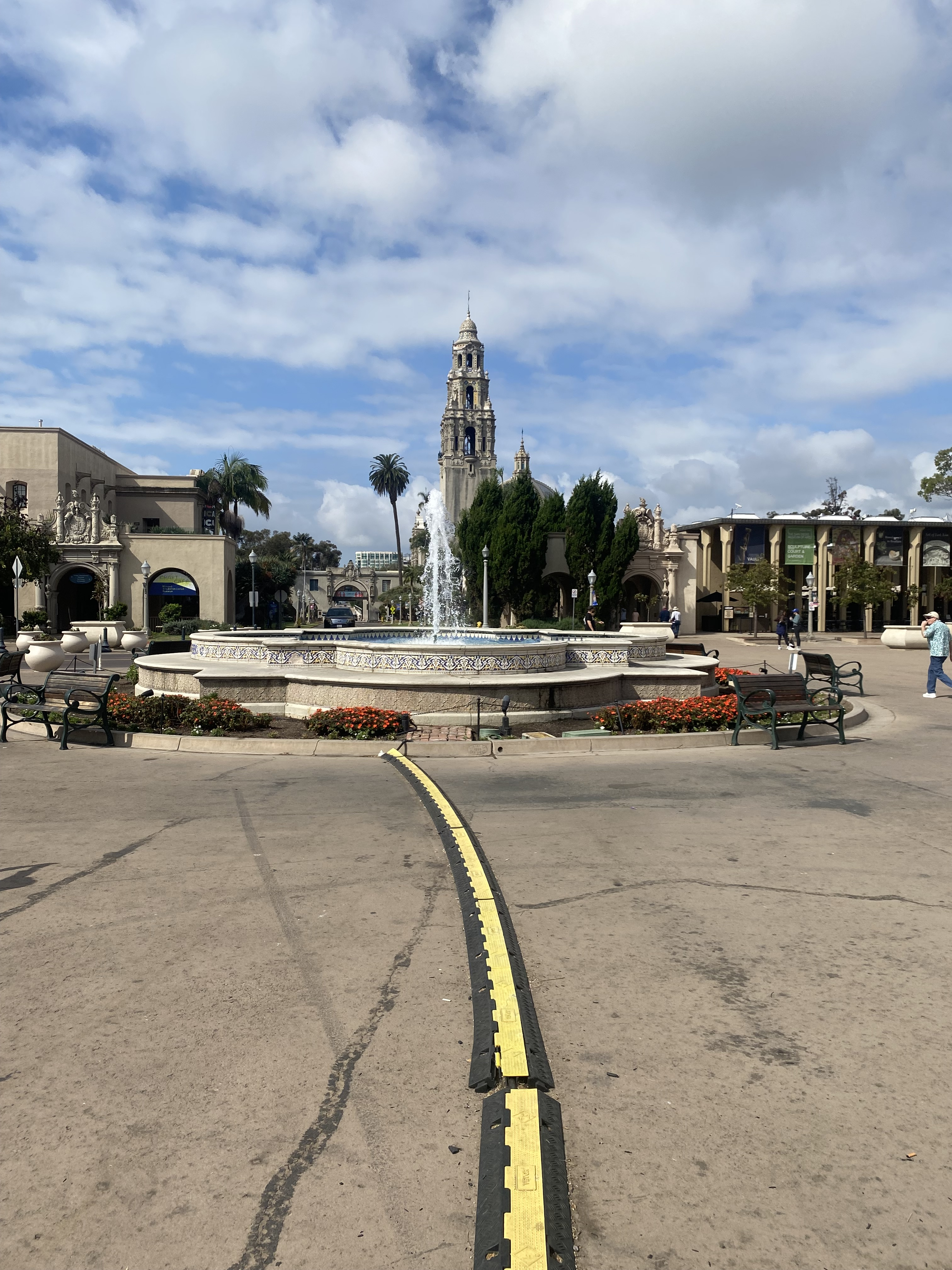
View of Plaza de Panama from street, 2024

Free green tram at Balboa Park, providing transportation between Inspiration Point and major destinations throughout the park.
