= Ginger Wallace =

American artist

Ginger Wallace (January 31, 1924 – November 23, 2010) was an American artist, sculptor and philanthropist based in San Diego, California.

== Biography ==
Wallace was born in Ogden and was raised in both Utah and Idaho, spending summers in Fish Haven. She attended the University of Utah and the Art Institute of Chicago, where she obtained her B.F.A and M.F.A. Wallace later attended the University of Chicago at the same time she ran her own gallery and created silent film. She also studied photography at the Chicago Institute of Design and at Utah State University. Her art was showcased at the San Diego Art Institute in 2007. She was a philanthropist, supporting art in San Diego and especially the San Diego Art Institute.

== Philanthropy ==
She and her husband, Robert Wallace, worked to advance art through educational programs and direct support of regional artists. She served four terms on the board of directors of the San Diego Museum of Man. She founded the museum's auxiliary support group, the Klee Wyk Society in 1962 and was a museum member for over fifty years. She and her husband were charter board members of the Committee of One Hundred, an advocacy and support group dedicated to Balboa Park. She provided leadership and resources to re-establish the San Diego Art Institute in the reconstructed House of Charm. Also among their beneficiaries were the Art Department at San Diego State University, Mingei International Museum, Lyric Opera San Diego and Young Audiences of San Diego.

== Art ==
In 2006 Wallace self-published an illustrated book, Extraordinary People Plus Unique, Above Average Children, a collection of whimsical watercolor illustrations. The book was launched through a series of events that took place in the San Diego area in December 2006.

An exhibition at the San Diego Art Institute, titled Ginger Wallace: Her Art, Her Wit and Relationships, opened on October 13, 2007, at the Museum of the Living Artist, which included art from a variety of mediums and reflects the many regions that influenced Wallace.

== Recognition ==
- In October 2007, Wallace was honored by Balboa Park's Millennium Society with its annual Millennium Award.
- The San Diego Art Institute gives an annual "Ginger Award" to honor "an individual who has provided exceptional support to San Diego artists and the San Diego Art Institute.".
- The City of San Diego proclaimed October 23, 2007 to be "Ginger & Robert Wallace Day" in honor of the Wallace family's contributions to San Diego.
