= Asian American Artists Collective Chicago =

Artist network in Chicago, Illinois, US

The Asian American Artists Collective (AAAC), also called "The Collective" by its members, was an informal network of Asian Pacific Islander American (APIA) artists based in Chicago. Founded on August 21, 2001, AAAC consisted of 100 artists from various sectors of the art community and used intersections of art, community, and activism to confront social injustices that challenged the APIA community. Though AAAC ceased to exist in 2005,various individual artists from The Collective remain active within the greater art community.

== History ==
The Asian American Artists Collective was founded by Anida Yoeu Ali (formerly Anida Yoeu Esguerra) and Marlon Esguerra.

Anida and Marlon (then husband and wife collaborators), founded the group because of their positive experiences in the early 1990s with collectivist action through their undergraduate literary magazine, Monsoon, at the University of Illinois Urbana-Champaign published by the Asian American Artists Collective. The group also formed out of the late 1990s and early 2000s spoken word tour with Emily Chang and Dennis “Denizen Kane” Kim in the group I Was Born with Two Tongues which they described as a “panAsian American spoken word quartet.” They were also influenced by the Seattle collective Isangmahal, which is a Tagalog word for "loved one" or "one love".

Along with artist and curator Larry Lee, Anida and Marlon began to merge with the FAAIM, another Asian-American artist collective. They felt the need to collectivize across Asian ethnic lines in reaction to the anti-Muslim climate following the World Trade Center attacks on September 11, 2001. With their members’ heightened awareness of anti-Asian violence, the Collective distributed information packets called "Remembering Vincent Chin" and "RE:9/11".

In the summer of 2003, The Collective hosted the 2nd National APIA Spoken Word and Poetry Summit in Chicago. Ali, as one of its founders, cites the AAAC's attempt to incorporate as a nonprofit as a key factor in their demise.

=== Sub-Groups ===
Though members participated in general activities hosted by AAAC, some artists also splintered into various sub-groups. Collectively, they put together annual interdisciplinary shows at the Foundation for Asian American Independent Media (FAAIM) April Asian American Showcase at the Gene Siskel Film Center.

The Collective consisted of four subgroups. Mango Tribe was an APIA women's feminist performance collective that promoted collaboration and encouraged artistic activism through theater and education. It was a multi-ethnic, multi-lingual, and multi-disciplinary ensemble with 22 APIA women from Chicago, New York City, Los Angeles, and Minneapolis. Kitchen Poems was a writing circle inspired by workshops and founded by Filipina-American author M. Evelina Galang. Young Asians With Power! (YAWP!) was created as a safe space for Asian American Pacific Islander youth writers.

== Notable Members ==
- Marlon Unas Esugerra
- Rominna Villasenor
- Tina Ramirez
- Sam del Rosario
- Kelly Zen-Yie Tsai
- Lani Montreal
- Ann Poochareon
- Anida Yoeu Ali
- Larry Lee
- Jienan Yuan (Chien Yuan)
- Kay Ulanday Barrett
- Laura Kina
