= Matt Kelley =

American filmmaker (born 1978)

Matt Kelley (born 1978) is a mixed-race Korean-American writer, public speaker and consultant born in Spokane, Washington, and living in Seoul, South Korea.

He is the co-editor of the Multiracial Child Resource Book: Living Complex Identities (2003) with Maria P. P. Root and is producer of the documentary film, Chasing Daybreak: A Film About Mixed Race in America (2006), which features U.S. President Barack Obama.

In 1998, as a 19-year-old, first-year student at Wesleyan University, Kelley created MAVIN magazine, one of the first print publications about racially mixed people. In 2000, he founded the Seattle, Washington-based Mavin Foundation, a 501(c)3 not-for-profit organization whose mission is to build “healthy communities that celebrate and empower mixed heritage people and families". Under his direction the organization created projects including the award-winning MatchMaker Bone Marrow Project, the Mixed Heritage Center and the Generation MIX National Awareness Tour. He left the organization in 2006 but continues to serve on its Board of Advisors.

Kelley is recognized as a spokesperson for multiracial Americans. He frequently appears in media and has received several awards, including being named a "Point of Light" by President George W. Bush. In 2004, as vice president of the Association of MultiEthnic Americans, he was the multiracial representative on the U.S. Department of Commerce's Decennial Census Advisory Committee. In 2005 he presented testimony to Congress about mixed-race health concerns.

Kelley has volunteered with several organizations that work with youth, Asian American, African American and lesbian and gay issues.
