= Nick Carbó =

Filipino-American poet (1964–2024)

- Born: 1964; Legazpi, Albay, Philippines
- Died: October 16, 2024 (aged 60); Frederick, Maryland, United States
- Occupations: Poet, professor
- Spouse: Margarita Elizalde Carbó

Nick Carbó (1964 – October 16, 2024) was a Filipino-American writer. He wrote poetry, essays, and edited magazines and anthologies. He is primarily known for his book of poetry titled Secret Asian Man (2000) Tia Chucha Press which won the Asian American Writers Workshop's Readers Choice Award. He also won the 2005 Calatagan Award from the Philippine American Writers & Artists for his book Andalusian Dawn (2004) Cherry Grove Collections. His most noted award is the 1999 Gregory Millard/New York City Department of Cultural Affairs New York Foundation for the Arts Fellowship.

Carbó spent most of his early career developing contemporary Filipino-American literature as a genre and he is credited by scholars such as Elisabetta Marino as playing an instrumental role in its modern conception. Through his anthologies Returning a Borrowed Tongue, Babaylan, and Pinoy Poetics, he consolidates both Filipino and Filipino-American experiences. The Nobel Library of the Swedish Academy owns seven of his publications.

== Life and career ==
=== Early life ===
Carbó was born in Legazpi City, where he and his younger sister Maribri were adopted by Sophie and Alfonso Carbó. At age 7, the family moved from their large home in Bicol to Makati. He attended the International School of Manila for Grades 2–12, putting him in direct contact with Filipino, American, and international elite. Carbó has stated that some of his early poems, such as "Civilizing the Filipino," stem from his experiences with the injustice of white administrators. As the capital city of the Philippines, Manila's close ties with America resulted in a heavy saturation of American pop culture and television shows like The Bionic Man, Charlie's Angels, and Star Trek which dominated his childhood. The movie and story of South Pacific particularly resonated with him, as the family dynamic of the French plantation owner and his two children in the movie musical resembled his own, as noted in his featured interview on National Public Radio. Carbó also enjoyed local Tagalog TV shows such as John N Marsha, Kulit Bulilit, and Uncle Bob's Lucky Seven Club.

His father was a major influence in Carbó's decision to become a writer and poet. Carbó's father was well connected to Philippine literature, as he was college friends with Philippine literary giant Raphael Zulueta y da Costa, whose book Like the Molave and Other Poems won the Commonwealth Literary Prize in 1940. He was also friends with the legendary short story writer Bienvenido N. Santos who used to play tennis in their house in Legazpi. His father often interrupted his television time to quiz him on classic literature and read poetry. Between ages 7 and 10, Carbó's father would cajole him to recite Philippine national hero José Rizal's "Mi Ultimo Adios" at large dinner parties, instilling in him an interest in classic literature.

In the fall of 1984, Carbó moved to the United States to attend Bennington College, and he began to write poetry that Carbó calls "silly love poetry that rhymes a lot." He was impressed by the famous writers that taught at Bennington like W.H. Auden, Theodore Roethke, and Bernard Malamud. While there he took classes from noted scholar Jose Hernan Cordova who exposed him to important Latin American writers Jorge Luis Borges, Julio Cortazar, Gabriel Garcia Marquez, Rosario Castellanos, Octavio Paz, Sor Juana Ines de la Cruz, Gabriela Mistral, and Jose Lezama Lima. During that period at Bennington College writers were getting published or signed by New York literary agents even before they graduated like Bret Easton Ellis and Donna Tartt. That was where Carbo forged a life-long friendship with Vietnamese writer Jade Ngoc Huynh, author of South Wind Changing. In 1985 he moved to San Antonio, Texas and he finally graduated from St. Mary's University where he helped to establish the Pecan Grove Poets. That group would go on to become the Pecan Grove Press. In 1990 he was accepted into the Masters of Fine Arts Poetry Program at Sarah Lawrence College. He studied under the poets Brooks Haxton, Thomas Lux, and Jean Valentine.

Carbó married fellow American poet Denise Duhamel on August 22, 1992, at the Stadler Center for Poetry at Bucknell University, where he was serving as the Stadler Resident Poet. Both worked for anti-censorship causes as a result of having their works banned. In 2008, the couple divorced.

=== Works and reception ===
Literary reviewers such as Vince Gotera and critics such as M. Evelina Galang have called Carbó's poetry witty, humorous, and avant-garde. Gotera has also described his work as balancing cynical satire with poignant humor while addressing American erasures of Asian history. The most clear example, according to Gotera, is Carbó's Secret Asian Man. The book's main premise is mishearing the lyrics in Johnny Rivers's 60s hit "Secret Agent Man" as 'secret Asian man.' The poetry's protagonist is named Ang Tunay na Lalaki (The Real Man) and he comments on New York pop culture through a Filipino-American lens. The book itself is written as a novel-in-verse and the character Orpheus acknowledges his status of being a character of Carbó's first book, El Grupo McDonald's. The unconventional inter-textual approach to narrative in Secret Asian Man became a staple to Carbó's style.

His work in collecting Filipino-American poetry into anthologies has set foundation for a Filipino-American literary culture to build off the rudimentary literary tradition of its mother country. There are not strong fundamentals for a literary tradition in the Philippines; in his 1961 lecture at Yale University "Philippine Literature: A Two-Fold Renaissance", Miguel Bernad contended that Philippine literature as an "inchoate literature of many languages." With 175 indigenous languages and both Spanish and American imperialism giving them new languages, Philippine authors split their readerships when choosing which language to write in. Carbó's conscious decision to amass Filipino-American writers into his anthology Returning A Borrowed Tongue intended to base Filipino-American literature in the English language to keep their audience whole, which literary critics such as Al Camus Palomar appreciate. The anthology includes poetry that recounts symbols of Filipino and Filipino-American life, such as jeepneys and cuisine, and use them as vehicles to convey the issues of their united identity. Palomar comments that the poets, who range from the early 1900s to 1990, are masters of English nuance and idioms and the volume as a whole being a stylish testament to Filipino poetry. Not all reviewers appreciated the focus on English, however; Roger J. Jiang Bresnahan opposed the decision, claiming it bred disunity by ignoring their common Philippine culture.

== Influence ==
Carbó's efforts to create both a Filipino and Filipino-American literary genre has established him as a major influence among his peers. He describes his first two books of poetry, El Grupo McDonald's and Secret Asian Man as "collective biographies," sharing the experiences of Filipinos other than him. Carbó often alludes to older Filipino works, his stories often contain historical figures, continuing the literary tradition F. Sionil José established in Dusk by depicting the famous Apolinario Mabini in the novel. In an interview with El Ghibli's Elisabetta Marino, Carbó claimed "the necessity of publishing more Filipino-related material for a world where there was no previous representation takes over the creative impulse." Carbó, alongside his poetry, began editing anthologies to group his contemporaries into the Filipino-American genre.

In his introduction to the anthology Babaylan, Carbó establishes discourse on Filipina identity, citing Spanish and American colonialism to be the cause of the Filipinas' disconnect to identity. His introduction serves as an unbiased account of the Philippine colonial history, and the role Spaniards and Americans played in the creation of Philippine culture and identity. His contemporary colleague Eileen Tabios's introduction serves as an artist's take on history, starkly contrasting Carbó's with her inclusion of emotion and experience as a Filipina. The verse and prose celebrate the Filipina and their struggle, and Carbó uses Babaylan to establish Filipino-American literary tradition further.

== Published works ==
=== Poetry ===
- Running Amok (1992)
- El Grupo McDonald's (1995)
- Secret Asian Man (2000)
- Andalusian Dawn (2004)
- Chinese, Japanese, What are These? (2009)

=== Anthologies (editor) ===
- Returning A Borrowed Tongue (1995)
- Babaylan (2000)
- Pinoy Poetics (2004)

== Accolades ==
=== Awards ===
- Readers Choice Award from the Asian American Writers Workshop (2001)
- Calatagan Literary Award from the Philippine American Writers & Artists, Inc. (2005)

=== Fellowships ===
- National Endowment for the Arts $20,000 (1997)
- New York Foundation for the Arts $7,000 (1999)

=== Grants ===
- Artist Relief Grant $5,000 (2020)
- Academy of American Poets Emergency Fund $4,000 (2019)
- Authors League Fund $16,000 (2017), $6,000 (2019)
- PEN America Writers Emergency Fund $3,000 (2018)

=== Residencies ===
- Le Chateau de Lavigny Maison d' Ecrivain (1998, Switzerland)
- Fundacíon Valparaiso (1995, 2001, Spain)
- The Corporation of Yaddow (1992, 1995, 2002)
- The MacDowell Colony (1997, 2000)
- Moulin á Nef (2007, France)
- Virginia Center for the Creative Arts (2003, 2005)
- Kimmel Harding Nelson Center for the Arts (2007)
- Convento Mertola (2008, 2009, Portugal)
- KunsternaLogies (2009, Netherlands)

== See also ==
- Barbara Jane Reyes
- Carlos Bulosan
