= Ramona Douglass =

- Born: Ramona E. Douglass; United States

Ramona E. Douglass (died 2007) was an American activist. In addition to her work as a medical sales and marketing professional, she was a prominent advocate for multiracial Americans.

== Education ==
Douglass was a graduate of Colorado State University with a Bachelor of Science degree in geology and chemistry.

== Activism ==
Douglass was a community activist for almost 30 years. She was a founding member of the National Alliance Against Racist and Political Repression and participated with Angela Davis' Political Defense Committee in the early 1970s.

In 1986 Douglass became active in the Biracial Family Network, one of the United States' oldest community organizations advocating for mixed heritage people and families. On November 12, 1998, the Biracial Family Network joined similar organizations in the U.S. and Canada to create the Association of MultiEthnic Americans (AMEA). Douglass, an AMEA co-founder, served as the organization's vice president (1988–1991), president (1994–1999) and Director of Media and Public Relations (2000–2005). She served on AMEA's Advisory Council until her death in 2007.

Douglass was a prominent spokesperson for multiracial issues during the debates preceding the 2000 United States census. In 1993, she testified before Rep. Thomas C. Sawyer's (D-OH) Subcommittee on Census, Statistics & Postal Personnel in favor of adding a "multiracial" category to the 2000 Census. In 1995, she was appointed, by then Secretary of Commerce Ron Brown, to the 2000 Census Advisory Committee. As AMEA's representative on the committee for 13 years, she contributed a multiracial personal and community organizing perspective. In 1997, Douglass testified before the Subcommittee on Government Management, Information and Technology of the House Committee on Government Reform and Oversight on behalf of multiracial Americans.

== Personal life ==
Douglass was of African American, Native American (Oglala), and Sicilian heritage.
