= Critical Mixed Race Studies =

Critical Mixed Race Studies (CMRS) Association is a collective of scholars, artists, community activists, clinicians, and students whose work analyzes and critiques social, cultural, and political institutions based on dominant conceptions of race. CMRS emphasizes the fluidity of race and other intersecting identities to critique processes of racialization and social stratification. CMRS works to undo local and global systemic injustice rooted in systems of racism and white supremacy through scholarship, teaching, advocacy, the arts, activism and other forms of social justice work. The biannual Critical Mixed Race Studies (CMRS) Conference is now organized by faculty members of various universities, but was first organized by Wei Ming Dariotis (San Francisco State University), Laura Kina, and Camilla Fojas (both of DePaul University). It was originally hosted by DePaul University’s Global Asian Studies and Latin American and Latino Studies programs in 2010. Its accompanying academic Journal of Critical Mixed Race Studies was founded by G. Reginald Daniel, Wei Ming Dariotis, Laura Kina, Maria P.P. Root and Paul Spickard founded in 2011 through UC Santa Barbara. CMRS symposiums have been held both in the U.S. and abroad, with hundreds of academics citing it as a research interest.
