= Lomakin =

Lomakin (Russian: Ломакин) is a Russian masculine surname, its feminine counterpart is Lomakina. It may refer to

- Aleksandr Lomakin (born 1995), Russian football player
- Andrei Lomakin (1964–2006), Russian ice hockey player
- Elena Lomakin, Russian-American artist
- Nikolai Pavlovich Lomakin, General during the conquest of Khiva, defeated at the Battle of Geok Tepe (1879)
- Oleg Lomakin (1924–2010), Russian realist painter
- Trofim Lomakin (1924–1973), Russian weightlifter
- Vasily Lomakin (1899–1943), Soviet Army colonel and Hero of the Soviet Union
