= Larry Lee =

Larry Lee may refer to:

- Larry Lee (American football) (born 1959), American football player
- Larry Lee (baseball) (born 1959), American baseball coach
- Larry Lee (musician) (1943–2007), American musician best known for his work with Al Green and Jimi Hendrix
- Larry Dale Lee (1958–1999), American journalist murdered in Guatemala
- Larry Lee Jr. (born 1953), American politician
- Larry Lee (artist) (born 1962), Asian-American artist from Chicago
- Larry Lee (1946/1947–2025), American musician with the band The Ozark Mountain Daredevils

== See also ==
- Larry Lieber (born 1931), American comic book artist and brother of Stan Lee
