= Elena Lomakin =

Russian-American painter

Elena Lomakin is a contemporary Russian–American artist. Her main body of work and paintings is influenced by nature and is considered abstract expressionism.

Lomakin was born and raised in Moscow, Russia. She earned her BA and MFA degrees in Art History from Moscow's Lomonosov University, attending from 1984 to 1989, while studying courses in the applied arts of painting and composition. She then travelled to the US at the age of 23 and settled down in San Francisco studying art at the San Francisco Art Institute for two years. In 2001, she travelled in Europe, returning to California in 2004.

== Career ==
Lomakin lives and works as a full-time artist in San Diego. She has been exhibiting since 1992 and has been featured in exhibitions including the San Diego Art Institute's Museum of the Living Artist Regional Exhibitions and One Foot Exhibitions. Her works have appeared in San Francisco, New York City, Chicago, New Haven, San Diego, as well as in Germany, Russia, Japan, and New Zealand.

She has been recognized by the San Diego Watercolor Society, Best in Show Award; the San Diego Art Institute Regional Exhibition & One Foot Exhibitions; the 7th National Juried Exhibition, Ceres Gallery, New York City juried by Cora Rosevear, Associate Curator, Department of Painting and Sculpture for the Museum of Modern Art in New York City.

== Influence ==
Lomakin's work is inspired by nature. It is a theme of her paintings, collages, and art installations. She also demonstrates the value of simplicity in her work, believing that art "can be both empty of meaning and a pleasure to look at".

It calls to mind growing up in Moscow. I can remember a huge park with birch trees. A Russian forest? Not the darkness of what was once the Soviet mindset, but the counterpoint of the birch grove. Light, slender, inviting and simply beautiful. Especially in the early spring, when there were still no leaves, and yet the trunks were able to embrace all the subtleties and nuances of the colors around, and sometimes seemed pink or even red, reflecting the descending sun.

— Elena Lomakin, excerpt from an interview concerning her work 'Prelude to a Birch Tree'

In 2020 she was one of the artists who took part Millennium Alliance for Humanity and the Biosphere exhibition What's Next for Earth.

== See also ==
- Museum of the Living Artist
- House of Charm
- Balboa Park, San Diego, California
