= Spickard =

Spickard may refer to:

- Spickard, Missouri, city in Grundy County, Missouri, United States
- Mount Spickard, mountain of Whatcom County, Washington, United States

== People with the surname ==
- Bob Spickard (born 1946), American surf rock musician
- Paul Spickard (born 1950), American historian
