= Andrea Chung =

American artist (born 1978)

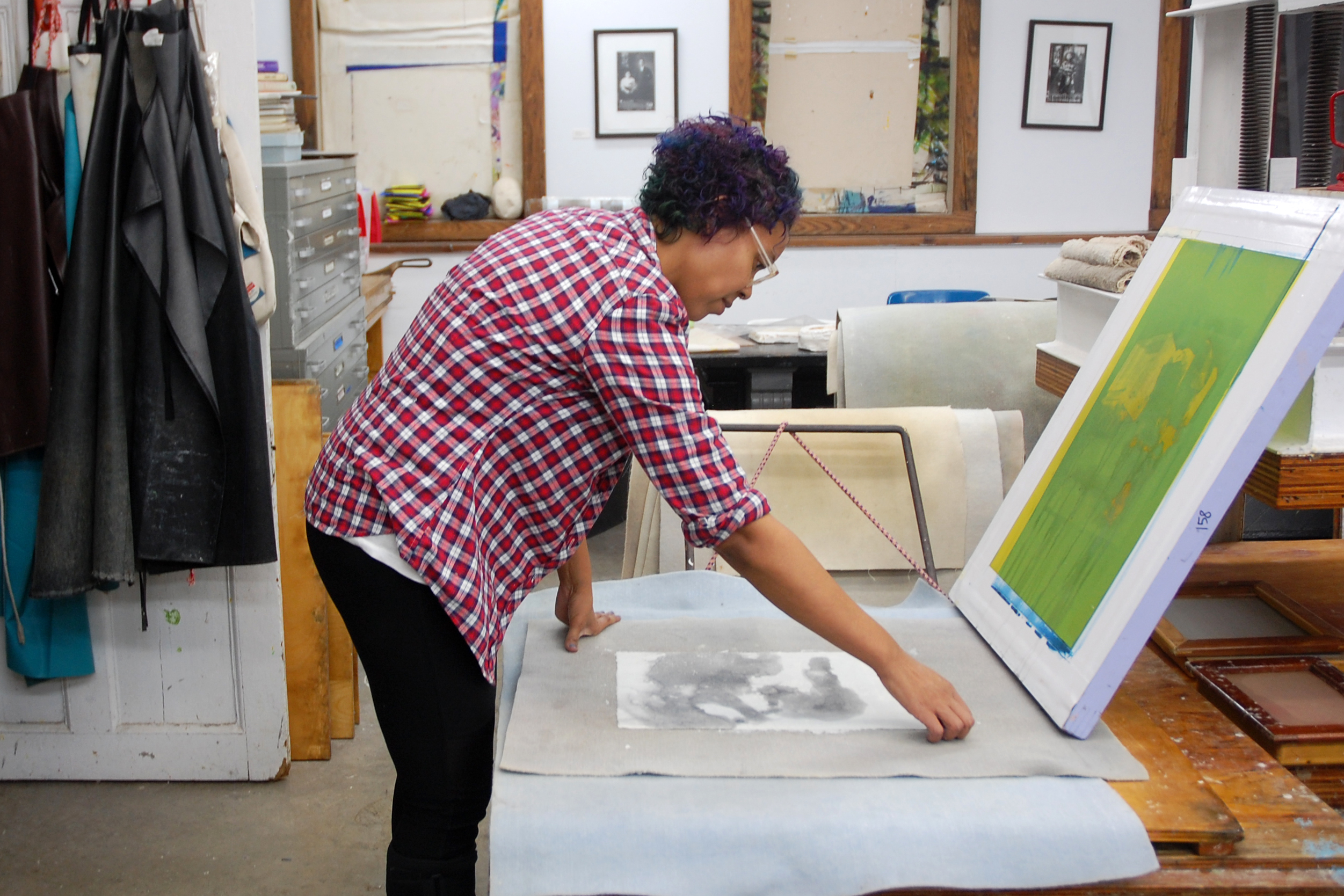
- Andrea Chung in the studio
- Born: 1978 (age 47–48); Newark, NJ
- Education: Parsons School of Design, Maryland Institute College of Art
- Website: www.andreachungart.com

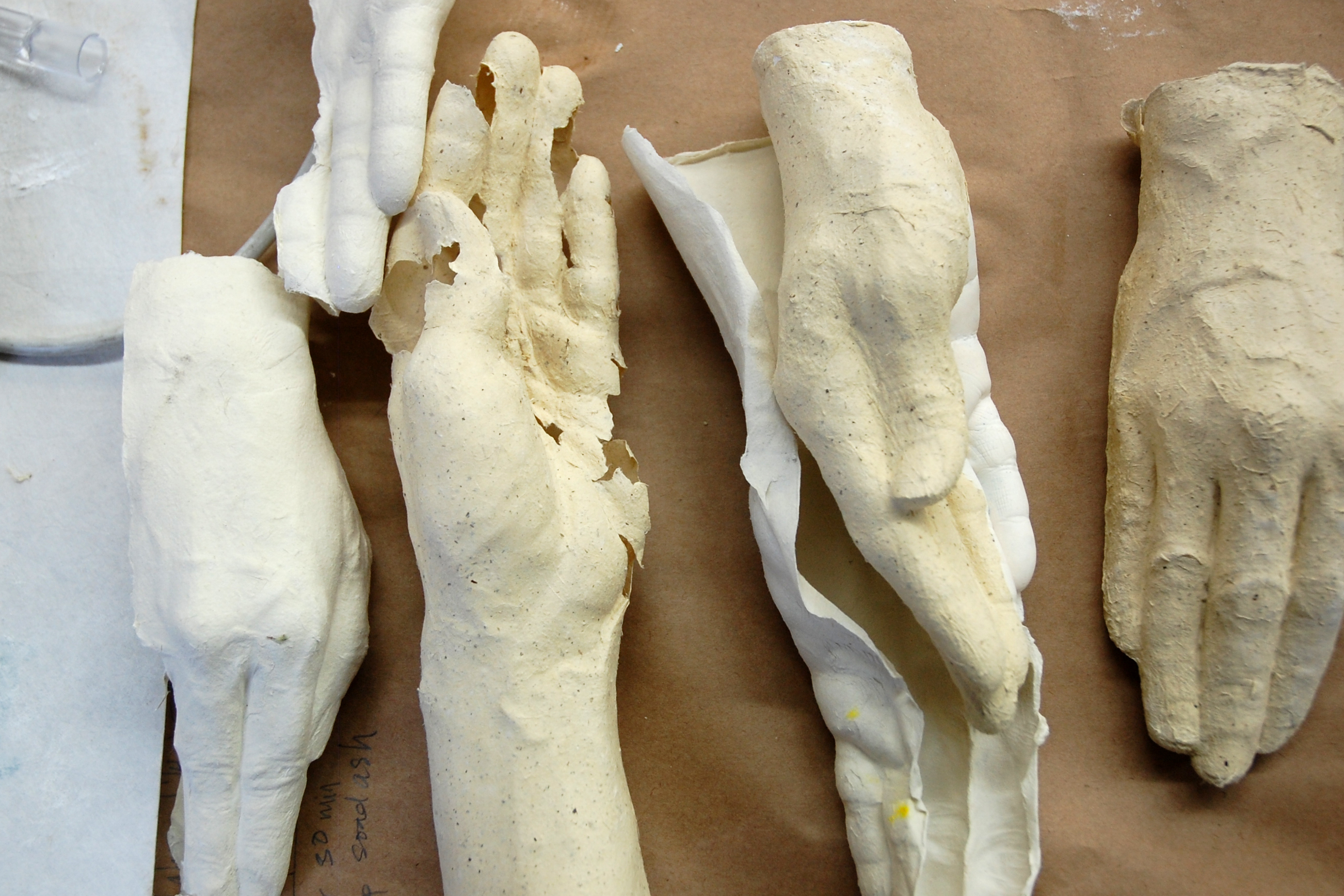
Image of work during Women's Studio Workshop in Kingston, NY.

Andrea Chung (born 1978) is an American artist born in Newark, NJ and currently works in San Diego, CA. Her work focuses primarily on island nations in the Indian Ocean and the Caribbean Sea; specifically on how outsiders perceive a fantastic reality in spaces deemed as “paradise”. In conjunction, she explores relationships between these cultures, migration, and labor - all within the context of colonial and postcolonial regimes. Her projects bring in conscientious elements of her own labor and incorporate materials significant to the cultures she studies. This can be seen in works such as, “Bato Disik”, displayed in 2013 at the Helmuth Projects, where the medium of sugar represents the legacy of sugar plantations and colonial regime.

== Biography ==
Chung was born to parents of Jamaican/Chinese and Trinidadian descent. She was raised in Houston, TX. Chung received her BFA in Illustration from the Parsons School of Design in New York and her MFA from the Maryland Institute College of Art in Baltimore in 2008. After her graduation from MICA, she received a Fulbright Fellowship to study in Mauritius where she created the performance work Securicorp, a response to the problem of street harassment. She also attended the Skowhegan School of Painting and Sculpture in 2008 and was the 2012 resident at the Headlands Center for the Arts and a 2013 Artist-in-Residence at the McColl Center for Art + Innovation in Charlotte, NC. Chung's artwork is found in the collections of Harvard University, University of Texas, and the Museum of Contemporary Art San Diego, among others.

== Exhibitions ==
=== Solo and two-person exhibitions ===
- 2017 You Broke the Ocean in Half to be Here, Museum of Contemporary Art San Diego, CA
- 2016 Pride and Prejudice, New Image Art Gallery, Los Angeles, CA
- 2014 Winter Exhibition, San Diego Art Institute, San Diego, CA
- 2013 Bain de Mer, Helmulth Projects, San Diego, CA
- 2013 Corporeal Contours: Firelei Báez and Andrea Chung, Community Folk Art Center, Syracuse University, Syracuse, NY
- 2013 Shifting Paths: Tom Block and Andrea Chung, CCBC, Dundalk, MD
- 2008 Arlington Art Center Fall Solo Exhibitions, Arlington, VA

=== Selected group exhibitions ===
- 2024 Spirit in the Land, Pérez Art Museum Miami, FL
- 2023 Spirit in the Land, Nasher Museum of Art at Duke University, Durham, NC
- 2020 Bodies in Singularity Klowden Mann Gallery, Los Angeles, CA
- 2017 Pacific Standard Time–Circles and Circuits: Chinese Caribbean Art, Chinese American Museum, Los Angeles, CA
- 2017 Prospect 4 New Orleans: The Lotus In Spite of the Swamp, New Orleans, LA
- 2017 Jamaican Biennale, Kingston, Jamaica
- 2017 Impressions: African American Artists and Their Connection to African Art, San Diego Mesa College Art Gallery, San Diego, CA
- 2016 indivisible: spirits in the material world, curated by William Cordova, Prizm Art Fair, Miami, FL
- 2016 A Bad Question, Wonderroot Gallery, Atlanta, GA
- 2016 Jamaican Pulse: Art and Politics from Jamaica and the Diaspora, Royal West of England Academy, Bristol, England
- 2016 Art of Dissent, Boehm Gallery, Palomar College, San Marcos, CA
- 2016 Jamaican Routes, Punkt Ø / Galleri F15, Oslo, Norway
- 2015 Convergence, Cabrillo National Monument, San Diego, CA
- 2015 Ephemeral Objects, San Diego Art Institute, San Diego, CA
- 2015 Bienial del Sur, Caracas, Venezuela
- 2015 New Contemporaries VIII, Valencia Gallery, San Diego, CA
- 2015 Venturing Out of the Heart of Darkness, Harvey B. Gantt Center, Charlotte, NC
- 2014 New Media, Trinidad + Tobago 2014 Film Festival, Alice Yard, University of the West Indies, Medulla Gallery, Trinidad
