= OCMA =

OCMA may refer to:

- Orange County Museum of Art, an art museum in Costa Mesa, California
- Oregon Council on Multiracial Affairs, an affiliate of the Association of MultiEthnic Americans in Portland, Oregon
- Oxford Centre for Maritime Archaeology, a research group at Oxford University, England
