= Alby, Botkyrka =

Suburb in Botkyrka Municipality within Stockholm, Sweden

Coordinates: 59°14′N 17°51′E

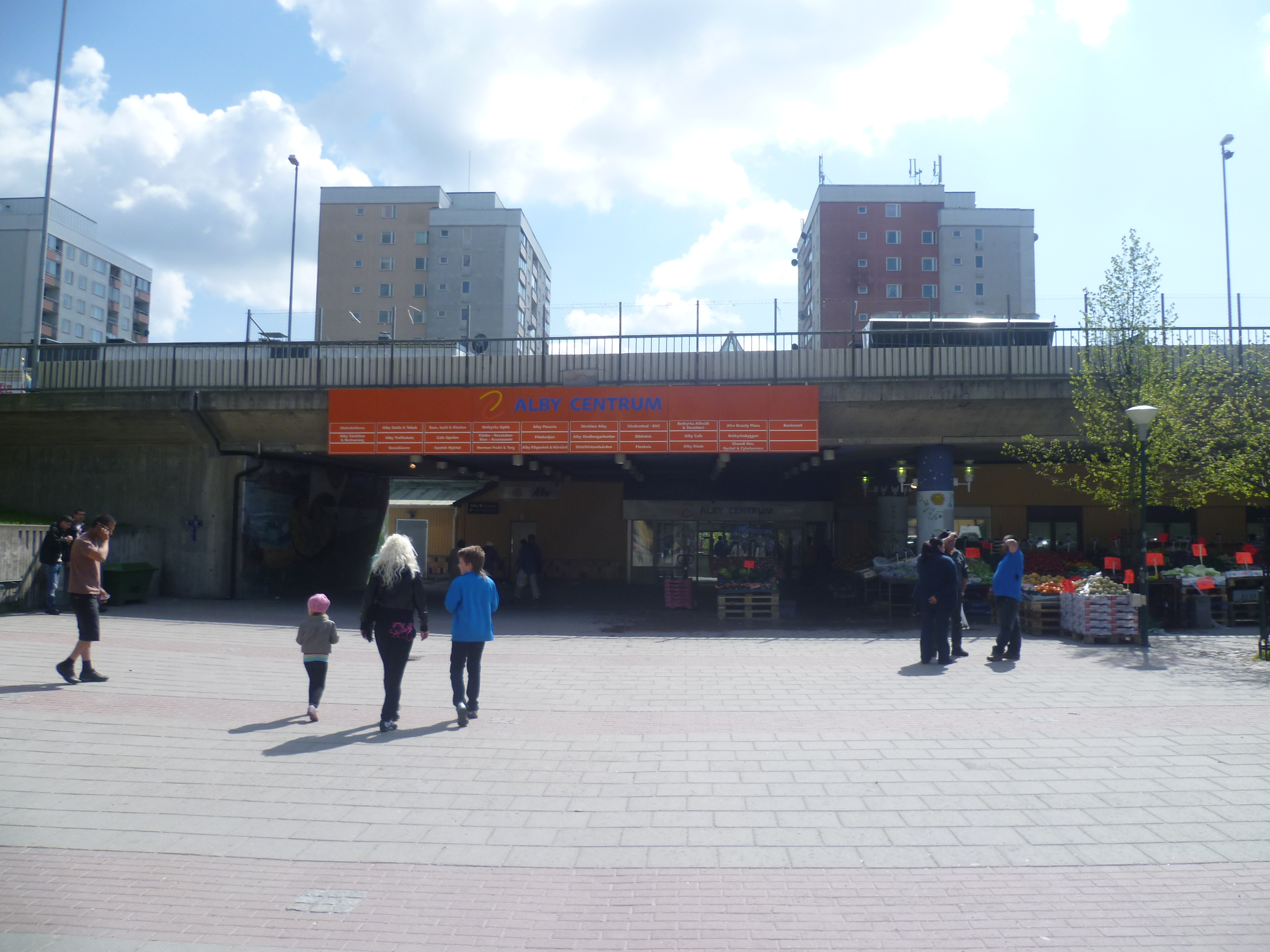
Entrance to Alby centrum from the metro.

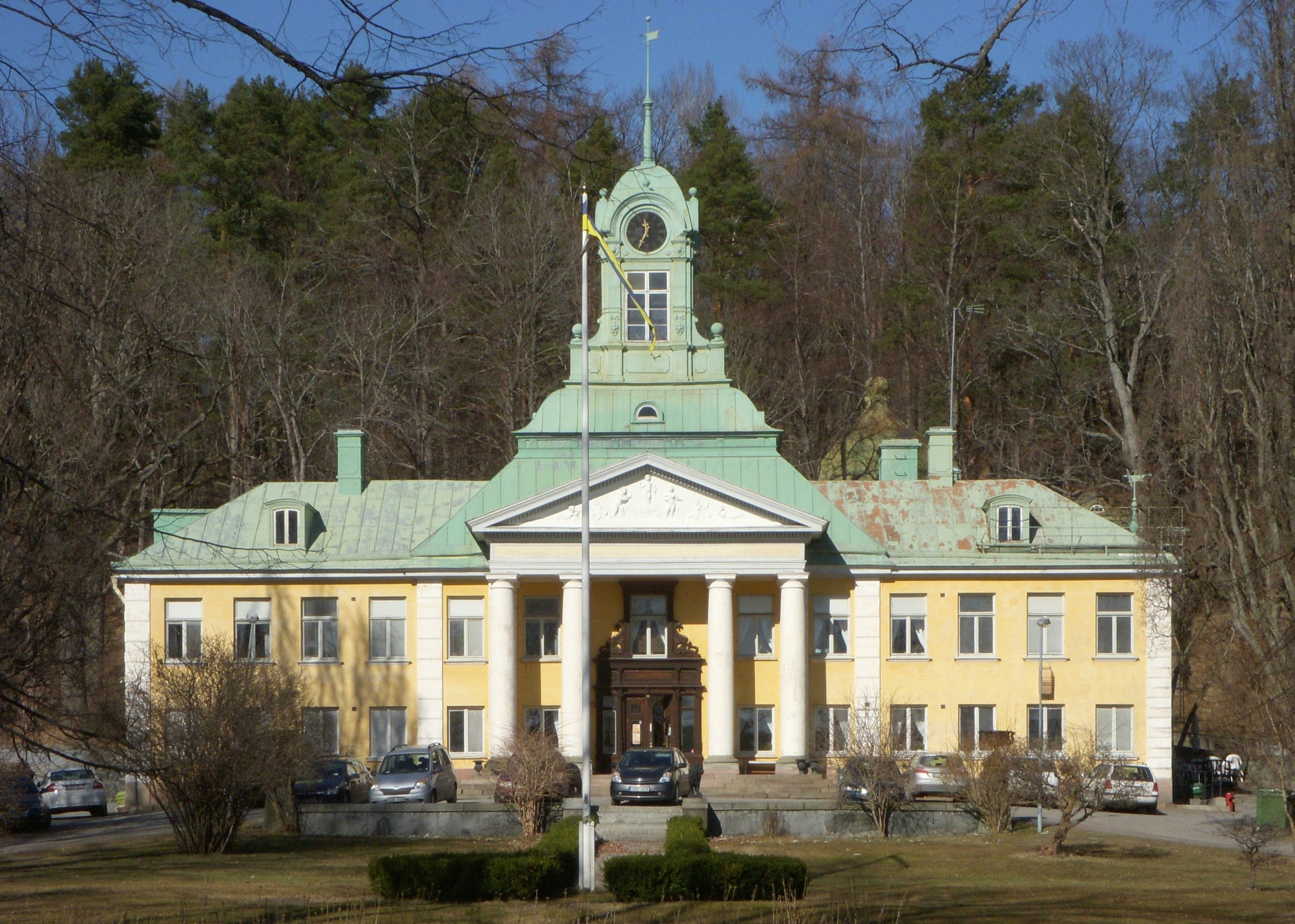
Alby gård, March 2012.

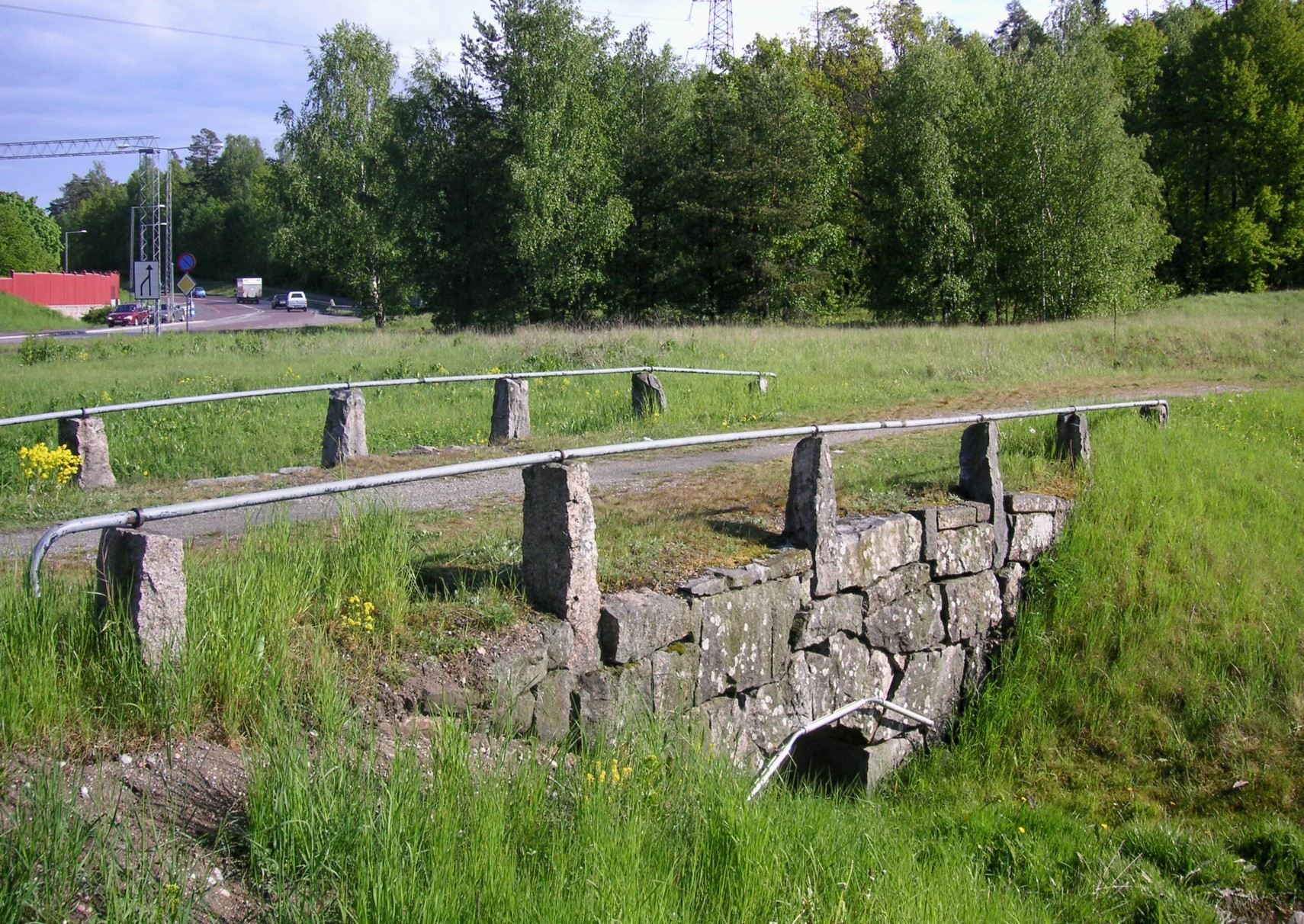
stone bridge Alby.

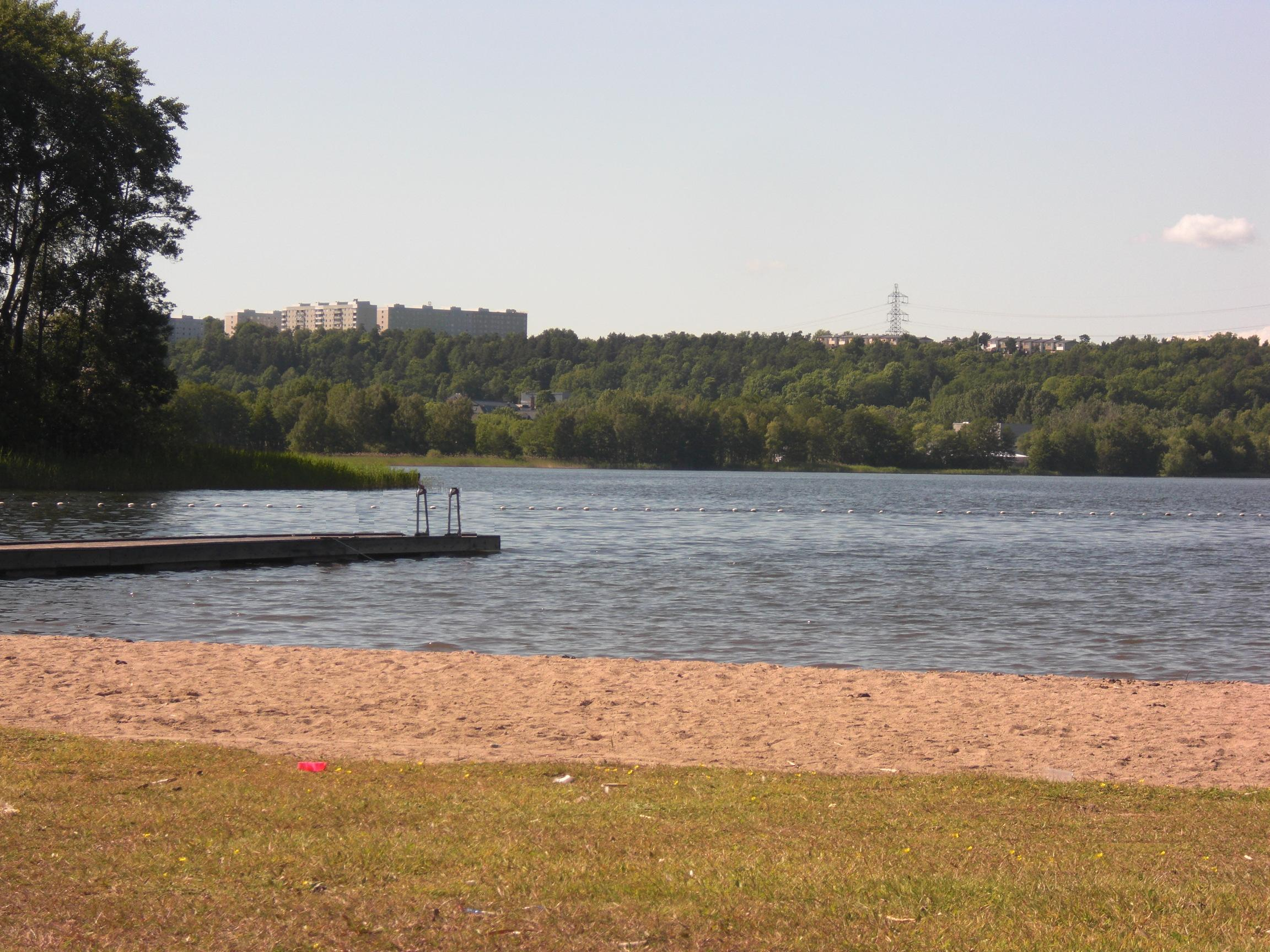
The hill at Alby as seen from Flottsbro.

Alby is a suburb in Botkyrka Municipality within Stockholm. Alby has one of the 100 stations of the Stockholm Metro system.

Alby, a municipal area in Botkyrka, had a population of approximately 11,400 in 2011.

In 1997, those with a foreign background were 65.1%, increasing to 77.3% in 2008, and 86.9% in 2024.

== Alby Centre ==
Alby centre was renovated during the 1990s, creating a new square and more premises for entrepreneurs.

During the year 2000, Alby Centre was repainted inside, and Alby's only heated garage received a substantial facelift. Additionally, two new shops were opened, and the health care centre increased its activity. The convenience store (Vi) makes large investments, and the whole of Alby exudes a new belief in the future.

== Nature ==
Alby lies by a lake, called Albysjön. Also not far from Alby lies Flottsbro, a place for fun recreation, both for winter and summer activities. Also, one of the well-known baseball fields lies in Alby, and one of Europe's popular softball teams practice and play in Alby.

In addition, a small harbour lies in a small bay where the boats are protected from wind and waves. The harbour has been there for a few decades, and it is the favourite place for locals to maintain their boats.

== Sights in Alby ==
Alby farm has ancestry from the Middle Ages. The farmhouse is built in Empire style with a strong classic impact. The farm got its final look in 1895. 1895-1913 the inventor Lars Magnus Ericsson owned the farm. Among other things, he built a drum mill and a building agency in concrete, similar to a Roman aqueduct, before he moved to Hågelby gård. Botkyrka municipality bought the farm in 1947 and today carries out social administration activities on the premises.

== Sports ==
The following sports clubs are located in Alby:

- Konyaspor KIF
