= Martha Longenecker =

American artist (1920–2013)

- Martha Longenecker
- Born: May 18, 1920; Oklahoma City, Oklahoma, U.S.
- Died: October 29, 2013 (aged 93); La Jolla, San Diego, California, U.S.
- Other names: Martha Williams Longenecker, Martha W. Longenecker, Martha W. Longenecker-Roth
- Education: UCLA, Claremont Graduate School
- Occupations: Artist in Pottery (Mingei), Art Educator, Art Collector, Museum director
- Spouse(s): John Longenecker, Sydney Martin Roth
- Children: 2
- Awards: Order of the Rising Sun (Japan)

Martha Longenecker (May 18, 1920 – October 29, 2013) was an American artist, professor of art, and founder of the Mingei International Museum in San Diego, California.

== Early life ==
On May 18, 1920, Longenecker was born in Oklahoma City, Oklahoma. At 9 month old, Longenecker arrived in California by train. Longenecker grew up in Monterey Park, California, and Pasadena, California.

== Education ==
Longenecker earned a Bachelor of Arts degree in Art and a minor in English from the University of California, Los Angeles. Longenecker studied painting with Millard Sheets. Longenecker earned an Art Education Credential and a Masters of Fine Arts degree from Claremont Graduate School.

Longenecker made her first visit to Japan in 1952. There she expanded her knowledge of the Japanese arts and crafts movement called "mingei". Longenecker undertook postgraduate research in Japan, where she studied from Shoji Hamada (1894–1978) and Tatsuzo Shimaoka (1919–2007).

In 2007, Longenecker received an Honorary Doctorate of Fine Arts degree from San Diego State University.

== Career ==
Longenecker created her ceramic arts from her own ceramic studio in Claremont, California. From 1944 to 1964, Longenecker exhibited her ceramic arts through Dalzell Hatfield Galleries.

In 1955, Longenecker developed a ceramic program at San Diego State University (SDSU) in San Diego, California. From 1955 to 1990, Longenecker was Professor of Art at SDSU, where she taught ceramic and design history.

In 1974, with the financial support from her husband, Longenecker incorporated Mingei as a nonprofit organization. Longenecker oversaw the development of the first Mingei museum, which opened in May 1978 at University Town Centre in San Diego. In 1978, Longenecker became the museum director.

Longenecker also oversaw the architectural design and the development of the Mingei International Museum at a new facility located at Plaza Dr Panama in Balboa Park in San Diego, which opened in August 1996. It is a 41,000 square-foot facility.

By 2005, Longenecker had publisher 33 books.

In October 2005, Longenecker retired as the museum director of Mingei International Museum.

In October 2013, Longenecker established Mingei Legacy Resources Foundation.

== Awards and recognitions ==
- 1998 Distinguished Service Medal. Given by San Diego State University.
- 2003 Order of the Rising Sun, Gold Rays with Rosette. Given by Emperor of Japan.
- 2005 Honorary Fellow of the American Craft Council.
- 2011 Inducted into the San Diego Women's Hall of Fame.

== Personal life ==
Longenecker's first husband was John Longenecker. Longenecker's second husband was Sydney Martin Roth. Longenecker had two children. Longenecker lived in La Jolla community of San Diego, California.

Following a stroke, on October 29, 2013, Longenecker died at Scripps Memorial Hospital in La Jolla, San Diego, California. She was 93 years old.

=== Legacy ===
- 1998 Martha W. Longenecker Director's Chair Endowment Fund.
