= Maria P. P. Root =

American psychologist

Maria P. P. Root (born September 13, 1955) is a clinical psychologist, educator, and public speaker based in Seattle, Washington. Her areas of work include multiracial families and identity, cultural competence, trauma, workplace harassment, and disordered eating.

Root has edited two books on multiracial people and produced the Bill of Rights for Racially Mixed People. The U.S. Census referred to these two texts in the deliberations that resulted in a "check one or more races" format to the race question for the 2000 census. In 1997, she received the American Psychological Association (APA) Award for Distinguished Contribution to Psychology in the Public Interest.

Root is a former president of the Washington State Psychological Association. She has served as Chair of the APA Board for the Advancement of Psychology in the Public Interest and as a member-at-large on the Board of APA Division 45 (Society for the Psychological Study of Ethnic Minority Issues). Currently she has her own private practice. She has served on the advisory council of the Association of MultiEthnic Americans and the board of advisors of the Mavin Foundation. She co-founded the Journal for Critical Mixed Race Studies in 2011.

She is an international authority on mixed heritage identity, credited with publishing the first contemporary work on mixed-race people. She has presented lectures and training in various countries, both in and outside of academia.

== History ==
Maria Primitiva Paz Root was born in Manila, Philippines and grew up in Los Angeles, California. She completed her undergraduate studies at the University of California, Riverside and graduated with bachelor's degrees in Psychology and Sociology. She went on to obtain a master's degree in Cognitive Psychology at Claremont Graduate School and a PhD in Clinical Psychology at the University of Washington, where her work focused on minority mental health. She currently lives in Seattle, Washington where she practices clinical psychology.

Her practice focuses on adult and adolescent treatment therapy, concerning topics such as life transition issues, trauma, ethnic and racial identity, workplace stress and harassment, and disordered eating. She established a group treatment program for bulimia in the 1980s. Root also concentrates on psychological evaluation, and works as an expert witness in forensic situations; offering expert testimony when cultural knowledge is necessary. She also travels internationally to public speak and train others on her studies of multiculturalism. All of her published work about her research has been very prominent in the psychology community, most importantly, her works were part of the reason Americans are now able to "check more than one" box when describing their race or ethnicity. Root is also a clay artist and maintains her own website when she is not busy with her psychological life.

== Published works ==
- The Multiracial Child Resource Book
- Love's Revolution: Racial Intermarriage
- Filipino Americans: Transformation and Identity
- The Multiracial Experience: Racial Borders as the New Frontier
- Racially Mixed People in America
- Diversity and Complexity in Feminist Therapy
- Bulimia: A Systems Approach To Treatment.

Root is also referenced in dozens of books and scholarly journal articles concerning race and ethnicity. She also wrote a few crucial articles or "guidelines" for understanding the struggles of race in America as well as to help those who are struggling with it personally. These works are:

- "Multiracial Oath of Responsibility"
- "Bill of Rights for People of Mixed Heritage"
- "50 Experiences of Racially Mixed People"
- "Ecological Framework for Identity Development".
