= Eileen Tabios =

American poet

Eileen R. Tabios
- Born: 1960 (age 65–66); Ilocos Sur, Philippines
- Education: Barnard College (BA); New York University Stern School of Business (MBA)

Eileen Tabios (born 1960) is a Filipino-American poet, fiction writer, conceptual/visual artist, editor, anthologist, critic, and publisher.

== Biography ==
Born in Ilocos Sur, Philippines, Tabios moved to the United States at the age of ten. She earned a B.A. in political science from Barnard College in 1982 and an M.B.A. in economics and international business from New York University Stern School of Business.

Translated into over a dozen languages, Tabios also has edited, co-edited or conceptualized 15 anthologies of poetry, fiction and essays, as well as exhibited visual art in the United States, Asia and Serbia. Tabios also founded the literary and arts press, Meritage Press; the poetry review journals Galatea Resurrects and The Halo-Halo Review; and the art gallery North Fork Arts Projects.

== Awards ==
In addition to receiving the Philippines’ National Book Award for Poetry, her poetry and editing projects have also received the PEN Oakland/Josephine Miles Literary Award, The Potrero Nuevo Fund Prize, the Gustavus Meyers Outstanding Book Award in the Advancement of Human Rights, Foreword Magazine Anthology of the Year Award, Poet Magazine's Iva Mary Williams Poetry Award, Judds Hill's Annual Poetry Prize and the Philippine American Writers & Artists’ Catalagan Award; recognition from the Academy of American Poets, the Asian/Pacific American Librarians Association and the PEN/Open Book Award Committee; as well as grants from the Witter Bynner Foundation, National Endowment of the Arts, the New York State Council on the Humanities, the California Council for the Humanities, and the New York City Downtown Cultural Council.

== Bibliography ==
Each of the following is a poetry collection unless stated otherwise

- After the Egyptians Determined The Shape of the World is a Circle
- Black Lightning (poetry interviews/essays)
- Beyond Life Sentences
- The Anchored Angel (Jose Garcia Villa), As Editor
- BABAYLAN: FILIPINA WRITING, As Editor (with Nick Carbo)
- Ecstatic Mutations (poems and poetics prose)
- My Romance (art essays with poems)
- Bridgeable Shores (Luis Cabalquinto), As Editor
- The Empty Flagpole (CD)
- Reproductions of the Empty Flagpole
- Screaming Monkeys, As Editor (with M. Evelina Galang and others)
- Gravities of Center (Barbara Jane Reyes), As Editor
- Behind The Blue Canvas (short stories)
- Menage A Trois With the 21st Century
- The Estrus Gaze(s)
- Crucial Bliss Epilogues
- Songs of the Colon
- Enheduanna in the 21st Century
- FOOTNOTE POEMS: There, Where The Pages Would End
- I TAKE THEE, ENGLISH, FOR MY BELOVED (multi-genre poetry)
- Pinoy Poetics (developed by Eileen Tabios; edited by Nick Carbo)
- Poems Form/From The Six Directions
- POST BLING BLING
- The Secret Lives of Punctuations, Vol. I
- The First Hay(na)ku Anthology (developed by Eileen Tabios; edited by Mark Young & Jean Vengua)
- The Hay(na)ku Anthology, Vol. 2 (developed by Eileen Tabios; edited by Mark Young & Jean Vengua)
- DREDGING FOR ATLANTIS
- It's Curtains
- SILENCES: THE AUTOBIOGRAPHY OF LOSS
- THE SINGER And Others
- The Light Sang As It Left Your Eyes (multi-genre poetry)
- The Blind Chatelaine's Keys (biography with haybun)
- NOVEL CHATELAINE (novel)
- NOTA BENE EISWEIN
- THE CHAINED HAY(NA)KU PROJECT ANTHOLOGY, As Curator (with Ivy Alvarez, John Bloomberg-Rissman and Ernesto Priego)
- THE THORN ROSARY: Selected Prose Poems & New 1998-2010 (Edited with an Introduction by Thomas Fink; Afterword by Joi Barrios)
- SILK EGG: Collected Novels (2009-2009)
- the relational elations of ORPHANED ALGEBRA (with j/j hastain)
- 5 Shades of Gray
- THE AWAKENING: A Long Poem Triptych & A Poetics Fragment
- 147 MILLION ORPHANS (mmxi-mml)
- 44 RESURRECTIONS
- SUN STIGMATA (Sculpture Poems)
- I FORGOT LIGHT BURNS
- AGAINST MISANTHROPY: A Life in Poetry (1995-2015)
- DUENDE IN THE ALLEYS
- INVENT(ST)ORY: Selected Catalog Poems and New (1996-2015)
- THE CONNOISSEUR OF ALLEYS
- Excavating the Filipino In Me
- The Gilded Age of Kickstarters
- I FORGOT ARS POETICA / AM UITAT ARTA POETICA
- AMNESIA: Somebody’s Memoir
- THE OPPOSITE OF CLAUSTROPHOBIA: Prime’s Anti-Autobiography
- YOUR FATHER IS BALD: Selected Hay(na)ku Poems
- TO BE AN EMPIRE IS TO BURN!
- IMMIGRANT: Hay(na)ku & Other Poems In A New Land
- Love In A Time of Belligerence
- MANHATTAN: An Archaeology
- MURDER DEATH RESURRECTION: A Poetry Generator
- HIRAETH: Tercets From the Last Archipelago
- TANKA: Vol. 1
- ONE TWO THREE: Selected Hay(na)ku Poems
- THE GREAT AMERICAN NOVEL: Selected Visual Poetry (2001-2019)
- Witness in the Convex Mirror
- The In(ter)vention of the Hay(na)ku: Selected Tercets (1996-2019)
- PAGPAG: The Dictator’s Aftermath in the Diaspora (short stories)
- INCULPATORY EVIDENCE: The Covid-19 Poems
- Political Love
- La Vie erotique de l’art
- DOVELION: A Fairy Tale for Our Times (novel)
- Kapwa’s Novels (essays)
- Prises (Double-Take)
- Simmering
- Because I Love You, I Become War
- Getting to One (flash fictions)
- THE INVENTOR: A Poet's Transcolonial Autobiography (autobiography)
- Drawing the Six Directions (art monograph)
- The Ballikbayan Artist (novel)
- Engkanto in the Diaspora
- The Erotic Space Around Art Objects: Selected Art Stories (1996-2026), 2026
