= Alby gård =

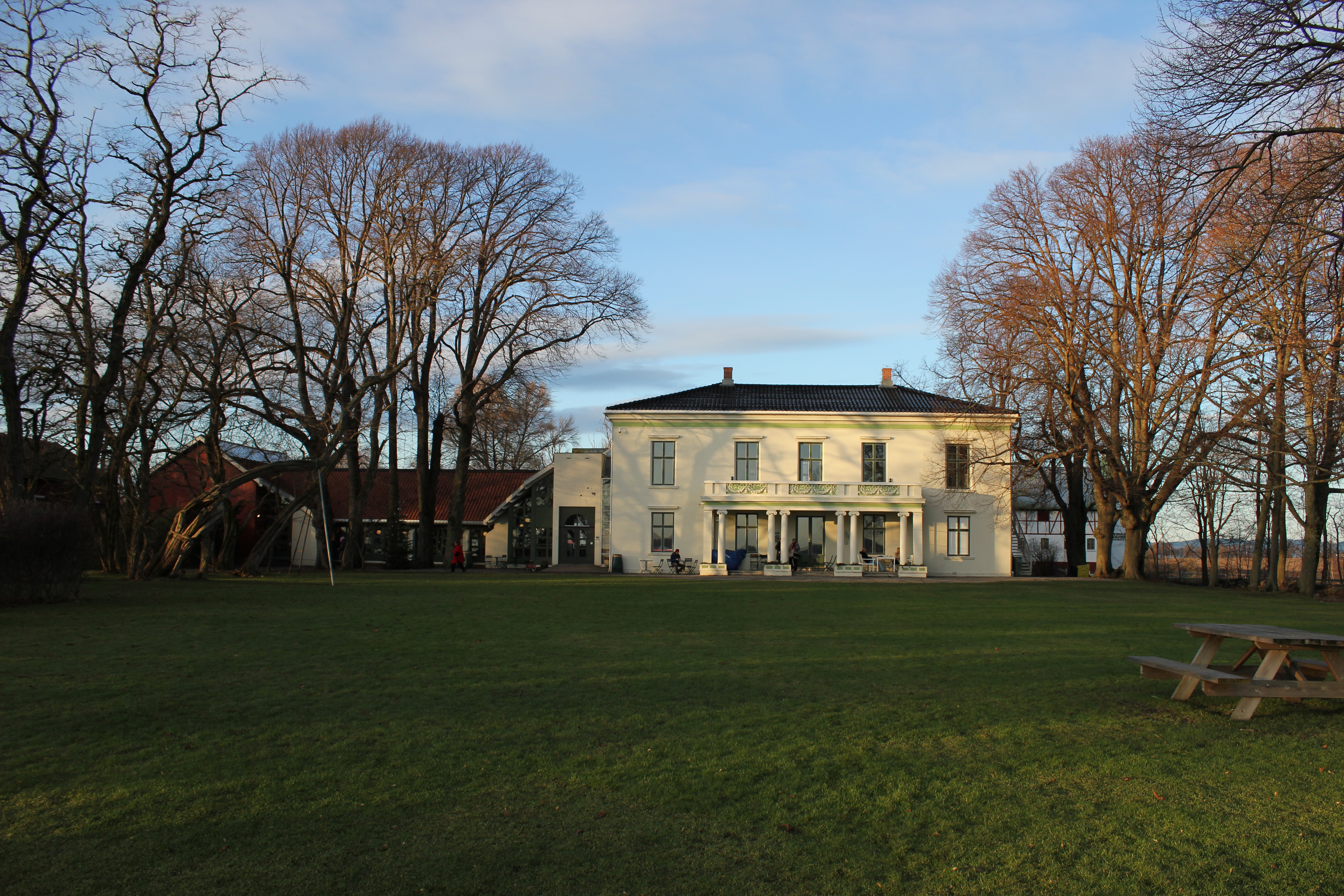
- Galleri F15 by Alby. Credit: Gisle Haakonsen
- Interactive map of the Alby gård area

General information
- Location: Moss, Norway
- Coordinates: 59.4244°N 10.6101°E

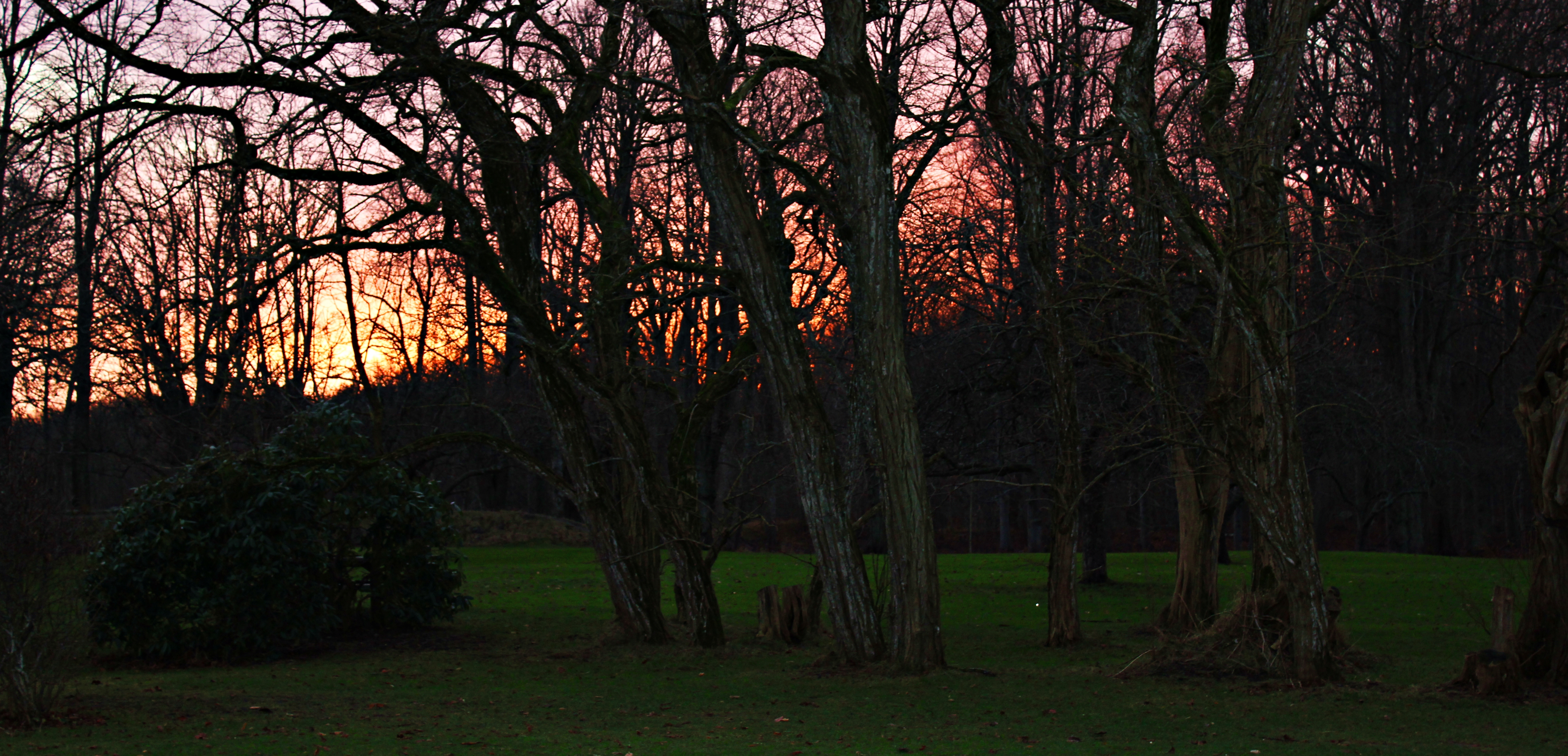
The garden at Alby. Credit: Gisle Haakonsen

Alby gård is the oldest farm on Jeløya in Moss, Norway.

The farm has roots back to early Viking Age. The main building was given its present shape after a fire in 1866, and in 1963 the municipality bought the farm of the last private owner, shipowner Biørn Biørnstad. Today, Galleri F 15 rents the main building, while the stabburet can be used by the county governor such as Jeløy Naturhus, and the land is leased away.

Jeløy is also a special area with unique nature. The Søre Jeløy landscape conservation area was created in 1983, and helps to preserve the historic characteristic of the landscape.

== Park and facilities ==
The park at Alby consists of a lawn with fruit and acacia trees. The park is designed such that visitors will feel like being at a beach by having a hidden field below which lies between the park and the sea.

== Hiking area ==
The forest that lies by Alby is a popular hiking area. There are paths that make the area easily accessible. The paths are also for the disabled. In the forest, Rødsåsen is where people can see the ski jumping hill in Holmenkollen on clear days.
