= IPride =

Nonprofit organization

iPride is a nonprofit organization interested in the well-being and development of children and adults who are of more than one racial or ethnic heritage or who have been transracially adopted. Founded in 1979, iPride, otherwise known as Interracial Intercultural Pride is the oldest existing multiracial group in the United States. Based in the San Francisco Bay Area it seeks to "create a more equitable society by educating ourselves, our children, and our community, about the interracial and multiethnic family and the mixed-race experience" through its various activities.

iPride is the founding chapter of The Association of MultiEthnic Americans
