= Biracial Family Network =

The Biracial Family Network (BFN), also known as the Chicago Biracial Family Network, is a nonprofit organization and social group based in Chicago that was formed in 1980. BFN was founded by Irene Carr and five other mothers who were the parents of biracial and transracially adopted children. BFN has traditionally focused on supporting those in interracial/intercultural relationships via education and social activities. However, over the years, its scope has grown to also include those who are of mixed heritage – biracial, multiracial, transracially adopted.

BFN also participated in the 1988 founding of the Association of MultiEthnic Americans as one of the fourteen charter organizations.
