= Paul Spickard =

American historian

- Education: Harvard University (BA); University of California, Berkeley (PhD)
- Occupations: Professor, Author
- Writing career
- Subjects: History, Ethnic Studies, Religious Studies, Critical Mixed Race Studies

Paul R. Spickard (born 1950) is an American historian and the author of several books on the subject of race and ethnicity, particularly multiracialism. His work was formative in rearticulating and moving beyond a black-white paradigm of race and mixed-race relations in the U.S.

Spickard grew up in a working class and Black neighborhood in Seattle. He earned his Ph.D. from the University of California, Berkeley and his undergraduate degree from Harvard University. He served as the Director of Research at the Institute for Polynesian Studies in Honolulu as well as Associate Dean of the College of Arts and Sciences at BYU-Hawaii. In 2013, Spickard was named a Distinguished Lecturer by the Organization of American Historians. In 2011, Spickard co-founded the Journal for Critical Mixed Race Studies. He currently teaches as a professor of history at the University of California, Santa Barbara, where he is also an affiliate faculty in Asian American Studies and Religious Studies.

== Bibliography ==
- Almost All Aliens: Immigration, Race, and Colonialism in American History and Identity, Taylor & Francis Group, LLC (2007), ISBN 0-415-93593-8
- Japanese Americans: The Formation and Transformations of an Ethnic Group, Rutgers University Press (2008), Twayn Publishers (1996)
- Is Lighter Better? Skin-Tone Discrimination among Asian Americans (2007)
- Race and Nation: Ethnic Systems in the Modern World (2005)
- Racial Thinking in the United States (2004)
- Mixed Blood: Intermarriage and Ethnic Identity in Twentieth-Century America (1989)
- A Global History of Christians: How Everyday Believers Experienced Their World, co-authored with Kevin M. Cragg, Baker Academic (2008), ISBN 978-0-8010-2249-4, previously published as God's Peoples: A Social History of Christians, Baker Books (1994)

== Awards ==
In 2011, Spickard was awarded The Loving Prize at the Mixed Roots Film & Literary Festival for his groundbreaking research on mixed racial and cultural experiences. He has also been named a Fulbright Research Professor and Rockefeller Foundation Residential Fellow. In 2013, he received the Richard A. Yarborough Mentoring Award from the American Studies Association and has received over a dozen teaching awards at UCSB.
