= Larry Lee (artist) =

- Born: August 7, 1962 (age 64); Chicago, Illinois, United States
- Education: University of Illinois at Chicago; School of the Art Institute of Chicago
- Occupations: Multimedia artist; curator; professor
- Employer: School of the Art Institute of Chicago
- Known for: Video, installation and sculptural works addressing Asian-American identity; coining the “Orientalia” conceptual framework

Larry Lee (born August 7, 1962) is an American multimedia artist, curator, and professor at the School of the Art Institute of Chicago (SAIC). He works primarily in video, installation and sculptural projects with a strong conceptual approach. His work focuses on political, cultural and historical issues concerning the Asian American experience. He calls this "Orientalia" which he describes as "[having] to do with... the physical and nonphysical, with what people associate with being oriental."

== Early years ==
Lee was born in Chicago's Chinatown but soon moved to Orangeburg, South Carolina in the early 1970s where he spent most of his childhood. In 1980 he moved back to Chicago and in 1986 spent a year living in Asia.

He attended the University of South Carolina for journalism but did not earn a degree. He returned to Chicago and pursued a BFA at the University of Illinois at Chicago in 1991, followed by an MFA at SAIC in 1999.

== Art work ==
Larry Lee's first exhibition was the seminal DestinAsian at the Chicago Cultural Center. In Chicago his work has been exhibited at galleries including the Chicago Cultural Center, Gallery 400, and the Korean Cultural Center. He has also shown in New York City, San Francisco, Philadelphia, Dallas, Houston, Cleveland and Glasgow, Scotland.

He became a part of SAIC's faculty in 1999 and teaches art history, theory and criticism. He also holds a position at the school as Associate Director of Admissions.

He is deeply involved in the Chicago Asian American community through affiliations with FAAIM, Molar Productions, DestinAsian, the Asian American Artist Collective, Center for Asian Arts and Media at Columbia College, Association of Asian American Studies, Diasporic Asian Artists Network and the Chinatown Centennial Celebration Committee.
