= House of Charm =

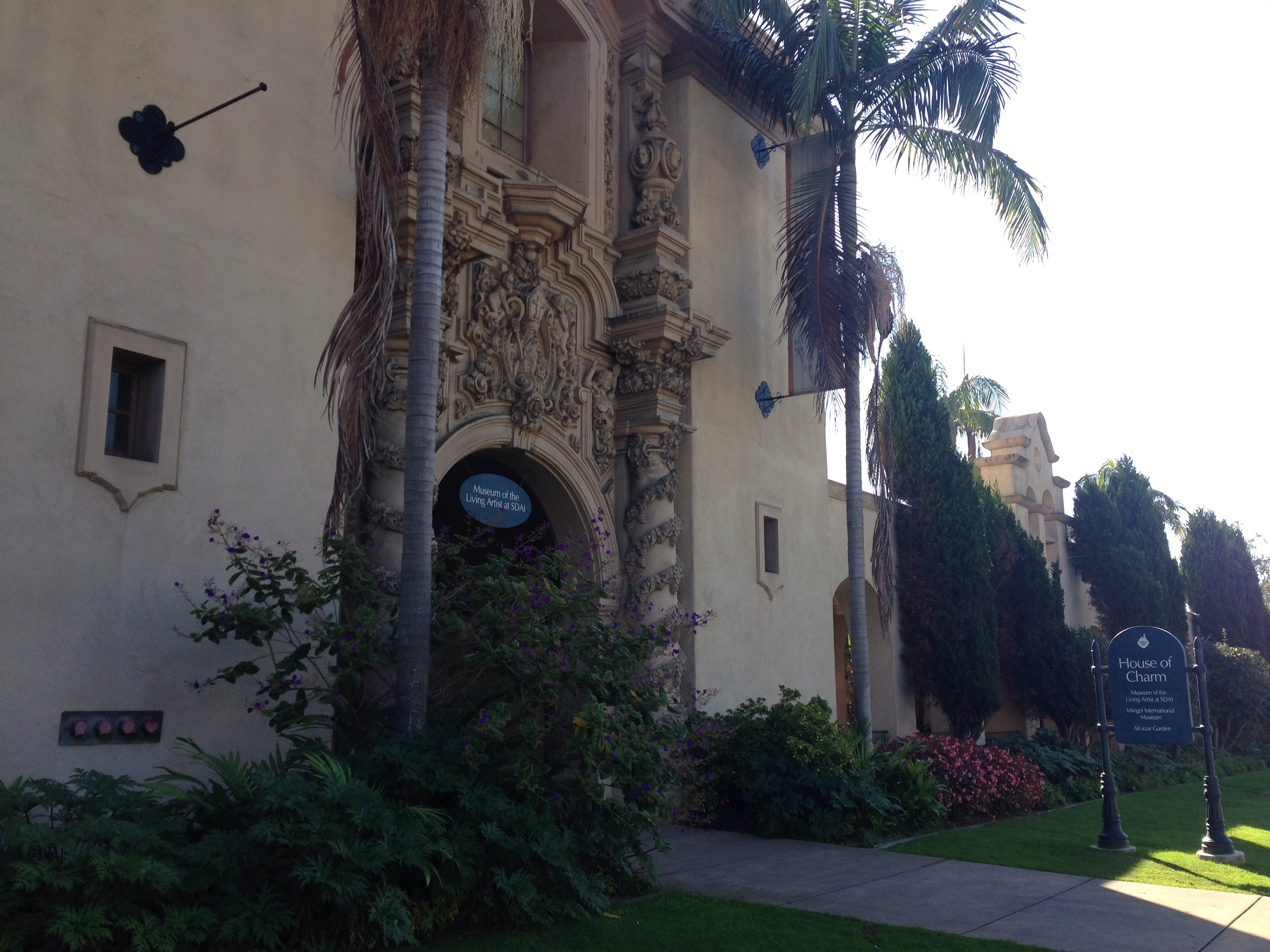
- Side of the House of Charm

- Location within San Diego Location within California Location within the United States
- Location: Balboa Park, San Diego, California
- Coordinates: 32°43′52″N 117°9′4″W

The House of Charm is a historic museum building in Balboa Park in San Diego, California. It was built for the 1915–16 Panama–California Exposition, and like most buildings from the exposition, it features Mission Revival architecture. It acquired its current name during the California Pacific International Exposition. It now houses the Mingei International Museum as well as rehearsal space for the Old Globe Theatre. It is listed on the National Register of Historic Places.

== Panama-California Exposition, 1915–1916 ==
San Diego staged the Panama–California Exposition in 1915 to celebrate the completion of the Panama Canal and to call attention to the fact that San Diego would be the first American port of call north of the Panama Canal on the Pacific coast. In 1910 San Diego had a population of 39,578, San Diego County 61,665, Los Angeles 319,198, and San Francisco 416,912. San Diego's scant population made it the smallest city ever to attempt holding an international exposition. However, the Exposition was a huge success and was extended for a second year.

The building now known as the House of Charm was originally named the Mining Building, intended to showcase the mineral wealth and abundance of the region of San Diego. Another temporary name was the "Arts and Crafts Building", but by the time the fair opened in 1915 the building was called the "Indian Arts Building". When the fair was extended to 1916, the exhibits changed and the building was once again renamed, this time to the "Russia and Brazil Building". From 1917 to 1922 it was known as the "Science of Man Building" and housed specimens, casts, statues, and photographs illustrating the development of the human species. It was later used for refreshment stands and flower shows.

Bertram Goodhue, master architect of the 1915–16 Panama–California Exposition, had urged that the temporary buildings on Balboa Park's main avenue, El Prado, be torn down. However, San Diego's citizens scorned this advice. With the assistance of money from the federal government, they patched up the plaster palaces in 1922 and 1933. This meant that most of the original buildings were available for re-use in the second exposition in 1935.

== California Pacific International Exposition: 1935–1936 ==
The California-Pacific International Exposition used many of the Mission Revival Style buildings remaining from the 1915–16 Panama–California Exposition, including the Science of Man Building. During the 1935–36 exhibition the building was renamed the House of Charm, by which name it is still known today. During 1935, it housed commercial concessions devoted to women's clothing, jewelry, hosiery, shoes, cosmetics and perfumes, as well as a drug store and refreshment stand. In 1936, the name was changed again to Palace of International Arts, featuring gems and artifacts from all over the world, some for sale and some for exhibit.

== Later use ==
Although there were ongoing doubts about the soundness of the building, which was not intended to be a permanent structure, it continued to be used during the 1940s and 1950s. Tenants included the Model Railroad Museum, the San Diego Hall of Champions, and the San Diego Men's Art Club (forerunner of the San Diego Art Institute). In 1978, the building was condemned as unsafe and was temporarily evacuated, but the San Diego Art Institute moved back in after sprinklers were installed. During the 1980s various tenants competed for use of the building, but none could afford the necessary renovations. Finally in 1989, the city of San Diego decided to tear down and rebuild the House of Charm, along with the House of Hospitality which was in similar disrepair. The recreated House of Charm building was reopened on September 21, 1996, with external features carefully duplicating the original highly ornamented exterior. The building now houses the San Diego Art Institute, the Mingei International Museum, and rehearsal space for the Old Globe Theatre.

== Museum of the Living Artist (MoLA) ==
The San Diego Art Institute's (SDAI) Museum of the Living Artist (MoLA) had a 10,000-square-foot (930 m^{2}) gallery in the House of Charm, featuring works by San Diego artists. A new exhibit opened every four to six weeks. Solo artist exhibitions were also featured.

== Mingei International Museum ==
Mingei International Museum reveals the beauty of use in folk art, craft and design from all eras and cultures of the world. The word mingei, meaning 'art of the people,' was coined by the Japanese scholar Sōetsu Yanagi by combining the Japanese words for all people (min) and art (gei). Yanagi's teachings awakened people to the essential need to make and use objects that are unfragmented expressions of head, heart and hands. Established in 1978, Mingei International Museum collects, conserves and exhibits these arts of daily use – by anonymous craftsmen of ancient times, from traditional cultures of past and present and by historical and contemporary designers.
