= Foundation for Asian American Independent Media =

Arts Education Organisation

The Foundation for Asian American Independent Media is an arts education organization based in Chicago that focuses on Asian American art, history, and issues and hosts an annual Asian American Showcase.

== History ==
The Foundation for Asian American Independent Media (FAAIM) was founded in 1995 by journalist Ben Kim, and musicians Sooyoung Park and William Shin. Known then as Fortune4, the organization's first project was a New York Times- and MTV-lauded recording and subsequent tour of Asian American rock bands, entitled Ear of the Dragon. In 1996, the group created the Annual Chicago Asian American Showcase (the Showcase), the nation's only film festival dedicated exclusively to Asian American film. Incorporated as a not-for-profit in 1999, FAAIM works with other cultural institutions in Chicago on Asian-American media and education.

Since 2001 Tim Hugh has been the Festival Director of FAAIM.

== Asian American Showcase ==
The Asian American Showcase is an annual film festival based in Chicago originally held at the Film Center at SAIC (now called the Gene Siskel Film Center). The Asian American Showcase exhibits independent films created by or about Asian Americans, as well as other media such as writing and music.
