= Mavin Foundation =

Mavin Foundation is a community organization which seeks to build "healthy communities that celebrate and empower mixed heritage people and families." Located in Seattle, WA, Mavin has been recognized nationally for its work toward a society inclusive of those in the mixed heritage community. Mavin’s current projects include Mavin Magazine, The Generation MIX National Awareness Tour, and The MatchMaker Bone Marrow Donor Project.

In 2004, The Association of MultiEthnic Americans and Mavin partnered to launch The Mixed Heritage Center, a national clearing house of information related to mixed race and transracial adoption issues.

== History ==
MAVIN initially began in 1998 as a "national magazine dedicated to the mixed race experience." The magazine was named MAVIN (Yiddish for one who understands) by then Wesleyan University freshman Matt Kelley. In 2000, the magazine became a 501(c)3 nonprofit, intent on expanding their programming to further impact the social and political state of the mixed heritage community.

== Timeline ==
- 4/28/1998: Matt Kelley announces, Mavin, a magazine for mixed race young people.
- 1/29/1999: Mavin magazine publishes its first issue.
- 2/14/2000: The magazine transitions into the 501(c)3 nonprofit Mavin Foundation.
- 9/15/2001: Two interns conduct Mavin's first bone marrow drive, a precursor to the MatchMaker Bone Marrow Project.
- 4/4-6/2003: The Mavin Foundation National Conference on the Mixed Race Experience in Seattle, WA draws over 500 attendees.
- 7/1/2003: Mavin publishes the 288-page, Multiracial Child Resource Book.
- 10/1/2003: With money from the City of Seattle's Race Relations and Social Justice Fund, Mavin launches the pilot phase of its Community Mixed race Action Plan (MAP).
- 5/1/2004: Mavin partners with the Level Playing Field Institute to launch the Campus Awareness and Compliance Initiative (CACI).
- 4/4/2005: Mavin launches its Generation MIX National Awareness Tour.
- 4/26/2005: Mavin founder Matt Kelley provides testimony to the Labor, Health and Human Services, Education and Related Agencies Subcommittee of the U.S. Congress on the health needs of mixed heritage Americans.
- 7/25/2005: Mavin launches Adoptee Empowerment Project (AEP) with funding from the W.K. Kellogg Foundation
- 11/14/2005: As part of Mavin's CACI project, students hand deliver 3,200 comment cards to the U.S. Department of Education in Washington, D.C., urging them to provide guidance to U.S. schools to adopt a "mark one or more races" format on forms that request racial/ethnic data. The initiative is a partnership with the Association of MultiEthnic Americans and the Hapa Issues Forum (HIF).
- 1/19/2006: Mavin releases the documentary film, Chasing Daybreak: A Film About Mixed Race in America.
- 2/28/2006: Matt Kelley steps down and is succeeded by Anne Katahira-Sims.
- 12/5/2007: Mavin and the Association of MultiEthnic Americans officially launch the online Mixed Heritage Center 2.0.

== Articles ==
organized by most recent

- Mavin: One who understands by Julie Dexter, Washington Health Foundation. Winter 2007
- Generation Mix by Suemedha Sood, WireTap. Posted January 28, 2005.
- When you contain multitudes by Mireya Navarro, New York Times. April 24, 2005
- Race isn't as clear as black and white by Florangela Davila, Seattle Times. January 17, 2005
- Multiracial and proud! Multiracial teens are claiming their own identities and changing our notion of race by John DiConsiglio, Scholastic Choices. September 2004
- Multiracial - a new way of thinking by D. Parvaz, Seattle Post-Intelligencer. March 14, 2001
- Birth of a Maven: Matt Kelley's brave new magazine targets a mixed-race world by Andy Steiner, Utne Reader. September/October 1999
