= Mingei International Museum =

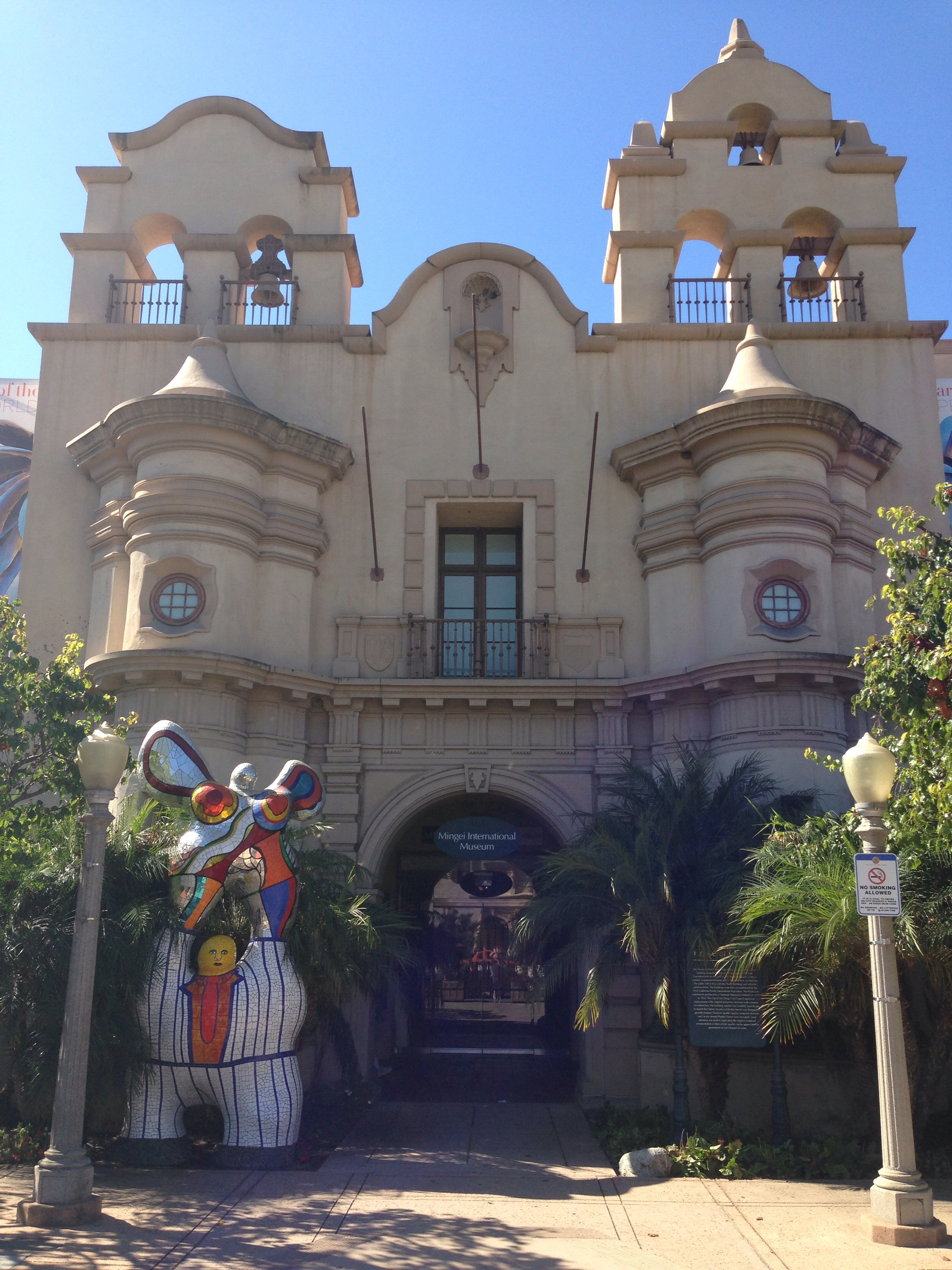
- Mingei International Museum

- Location within San Diego Location within California Location within the United States
- Established: 1978
- Location: House of Charm; Balboa Park, San Diego, California
- Coordinates: 32°43′52″N 117°9′4″W
- Type: Art museum
- Director: Jessica Hanson York
- Website: mingei.org

Mingei International Museum is a non-profit public institution in Balboa Park in San Diego, California, that collects, conserves and exhibits folk art, craft, and design. The museum was founded in 1974, and its building opened in 1978. The word mingei, meaning 'art of the people,' was coined by the Japanese scholar Dr. Sōetsu Yanagi by combining the Japanese words for all people (min 民) and art (gei 芸).

== History ==
Mingei International Museum was founded by Martha Longenecker, Professor of Art Emerita, San Diego State University. As an artist craftsman who studied pottery-making in Japan, she became acquainted with and learned from the founders and leaders of the Mingei Association of Japan. Under her guidance, the museum was established and developed over more than 27 years.

In May 1978, Mingei International Museum of World Folk Art opened at University Towne Centre in San Diego with the exhibition, Dolls and Folk Toys of the World.

In August 1996, Mingei International was relocated to the historic House of Charm on the Plaza de Panama in Balboa Park. It shares the central square with the San Diego Museum of Art and the Timken Museum of Art.

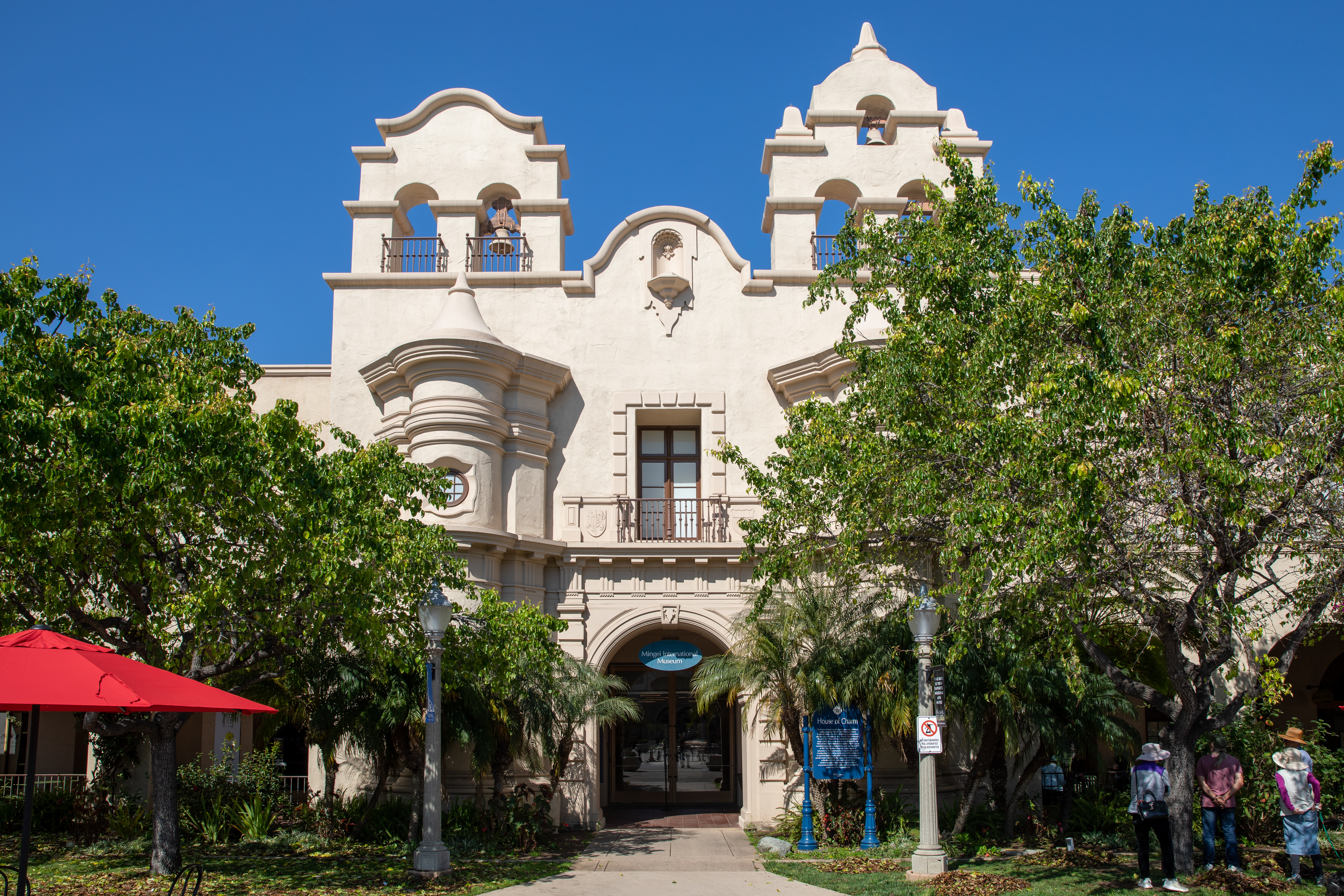

In 2003, Mingei International opened a second museum in downtown Escondido, in North San Diego County. The premiere exhibition, Niki de Saint Phalle Remembered featured Niki de Saint Phalle's work from the museum's permanent collection and loans from the Niki Charitable Art Foundation.

In its 30-year history, Mingei International has presented 140 exhibitions, accompanied by related lectures, films, demonstrations, workshops, music, theater and dance.

Mingei International Museum closed its Escondido museum galleries to the public on June 26, 2010.

== Collections ==
The museum's collections comprise 17,500 objects from 141 countries. The collections contain artifacts from the 3rd century BCE to the present day and include objects as diverse as ancient clay vessels and 21st-century Venetian glass.

Several regions of the world are represented.

- Mexico: pottery, wood carvings, textiles, retablos, masks
- India: bronzes, wood carvings, pottery, textiles
- China: costumes, jewelry, wood carvings, pottery
- Japan: pottery, textiles, wood carvings, lacquer ware, metal work
- Indonesia: ancestral monuments, wood carvings, textiles, masks, sculptures
- Africa: pottery, head rests, stools, masks, textiles
- Pre-Columbian: pottery and textiles from Central and South America
- Middle East: textiles, jewelry, wood carvings
- US: mid 20th-century pottery; contemporary furniture, textiles, glass; Navajo weavings

== Exhibitions at Mingei ==
| Title | Duration | Curator(s) |
|---|---|---|
| MAKE: Skateboarding's Do It Yourself Revolution | November 21, 2026 - May 9, 2027 | Mayo Mendoza Guusje Sanders |
| Restitched: Feed Sacks in Mid-Twentieth Century Quilts | November 22, 2025 - May 10, 2026 | Guusje Sanders |
| Boundless: Reflections of Southern California Landscapes in Midcentury Studio Ceramics | September 27, 2025 - June 7, 2026 | Guusje Sanders |
| Inside the Design Center | September 6, 2025 - April 12, 2026 | Dave Hampton Steve Aldana Todd Pitman |
| Tuck and Roll: The Art of Armadillos | May 24, 2025 - January 11, 2026 | Guusje Sanders |
| Layered Narratives: Quilted Stories of Gender and Race at the 1876 Centennial | May 17, 2025 - November 16, 2025 | Olivia Zen Joseph |
| Historic Footprints: Native American Ledger Drawing from Fort Marion | April 12, 2025 - August 17, 2025 | Ross Frank Dr. Emily G. Hanna |
| Across the Spooniverse | April 12, 2025 - August 17, 2025 | Dr. Emily G. Hanna Bruno Claessens |
| Student Craft 2025 | April 5, 2025 - August 17, 2025 | Juried Exhibition |
| Fashioning an Icon: Virgin of Guadalupe Imagery in Textile Design | April 5, 2025 - September 7, 2025 | Ariana Torres |
| Blue Gold: The Art and Science of Indigo | September 14, 2024 - March 16, 2025 | Dr. Emily G. Hanna Guusje Sanders Barbara Hanson Forsyth |
