= San Diego Art Institute =

Former art museum in San Diego, California

Coordinates: 32°43′51.98″N 117°9′3.65″W

The San Diego Art Institute
- Founded: May 1941 by Walter W. Austin in San Diego
- Type: Non-profit; NGO
- Location(s): House of Charm San Diego, California, U.S.
- Services: exhibition, youth art education, professional development, artist residency
- Fields: Contemporary art
- Key people: See list (Lissa Corona, Interim Executive Director; Ginger Shulick Porcella, previous Executive Director; Bruce Tall, Chair, Board of Directors)
- Website: http://www.sandiego-art.org

The San Diego Art Institute was a contemporary art museum with a focus on artists from the Southern California and Baja Norte region. It was founded in 1941 as the San Diego Business Men's Art Club. Its name was changed in 1950 to the San Diego Art Institute. In 1953, women were admitted for membership. It officially became a nonprofit in 1963. The San Diego Art Institute in Balboa Park and Lux Art Institute in Encinitas merged in September 2021 to become the Institute of Contemporary Art, San Diego, with each museum continuing to operate at its respective site.

== History ==
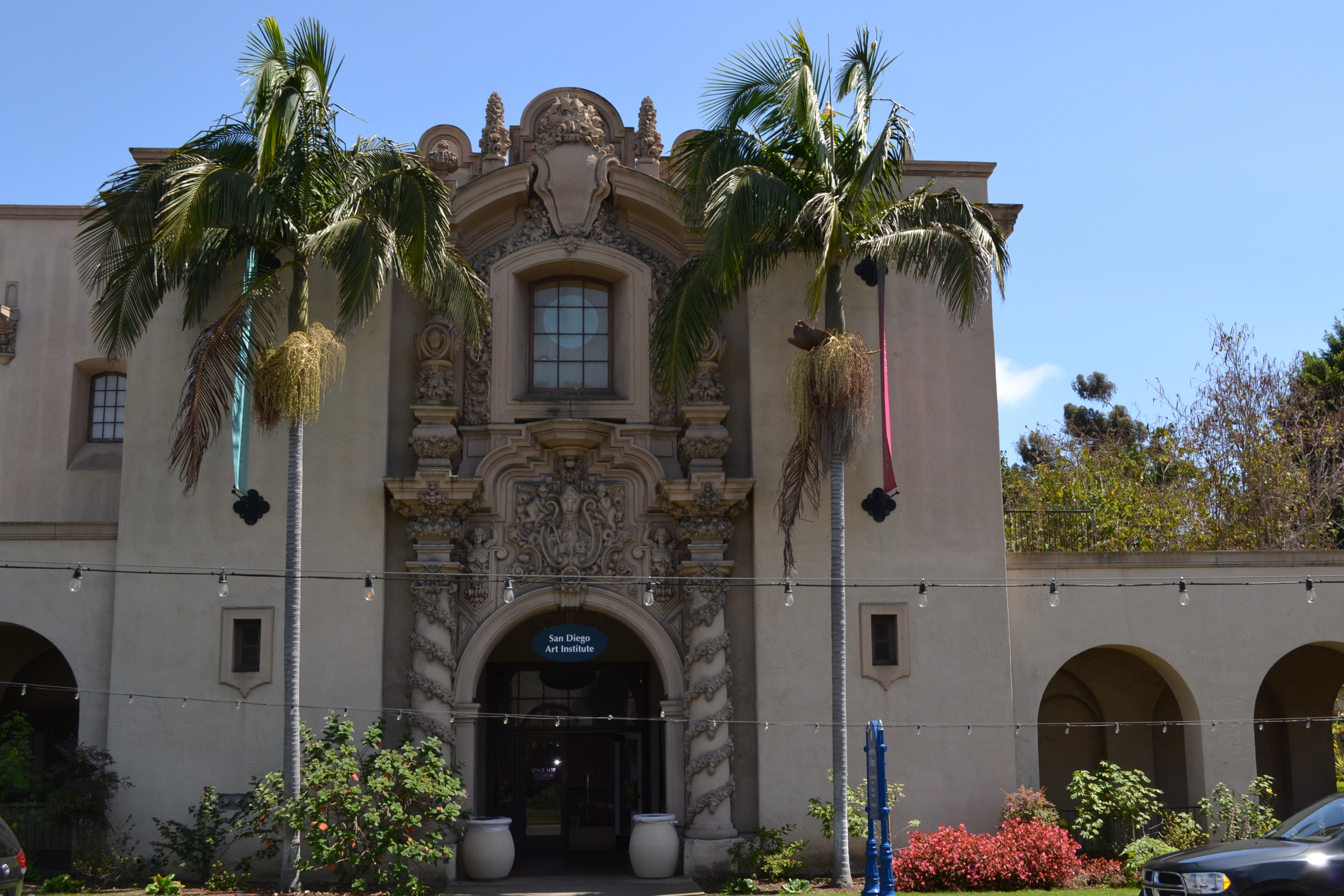
San Diego Art Institute in Balboa Park

In 1941, a group of San Diego businessmen met in the office of then director of the Fine Arts Gallery in Balboa Park, Reginald Poland. They formed a group, with the chief objective the painting of local characteristic and historical scenes of San Diego and vicinity. Invitations were issued to painters interested in preserving the memories of the fast disappearing early landmarks of San Diego County. In May, a re-organizational meeting was held, at which time the name "San Diego Business Men’s Art Club" was adopted. The first president was Walter W. Austin, former mayor of San Diego. The first instructor was Maurice Braun, known for his mellow California landscapes as well as for his unusual teaching ability. Otto Schneider, Alfred R. Mitchell and many others also acted as instructors of this enthusiastic outdoor painting group. Exhibitions of the work of club members were held at various places; the first one-man show to be held by a member of the original group was by Charles Small in Bohnens Studio at Fifth and Laurel Streets.

In 1942, the San Diego Business Men's Art Club negotiated with the city for studio quarters in the Spanish Village in Balboa Park. Before this arrangement could be consummated, World War II intervened; Balboa Park was requisitioned for use in the war effort. During the war the club was relatively inactive, except for a member exhibition in the La Jolla Art Center in June 1944. After the end of the war, interest in the project was revived and the club was reorganized at a meeting held on April 4, 1947. In 1947, there was an increase in activity resulting in many outdoor painting sessions, including one at the Pine Hills ranch of Fred Heilbron, one of the original members. Several painting exhibitions were held by members, including one at the San Diego Club with an attendance of more than 140 people. In 1947, E. H. Pohl and Ben Vaganoff were added to the list of club instructors.

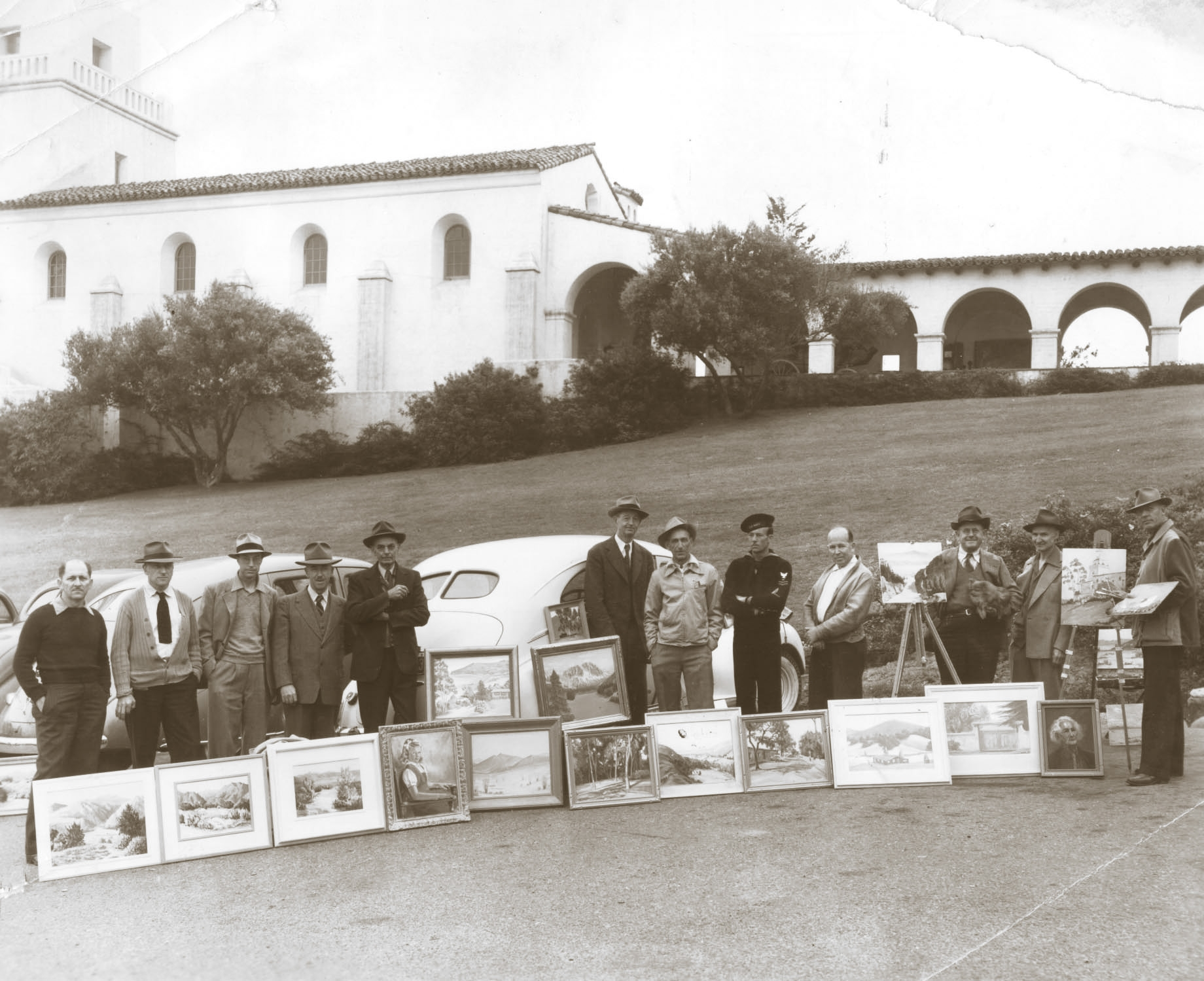
The original San Diego Business Men's Art Club, circa 1947

During 1948, increased interest and enthusiasm was manifested by alternate Saturday painting trips by the membership to various sites in San Diego County. The all-county Art Mart held in November of that year at 6th and Laurel Streets was under the chairmanship of one of their instructors, Alfred R. Mitchell. Most of the members of the San Diego Business Men's Art Club participated in this activity, which greatly increased the public interest in the organization. For a number of years following the 1948 Art Mart, this activity was under the chairmanship of a member of the San Diego Business Men's Art Club.

In 1949, the efforts of the club were increased and expanded. Exhibitions were held in numerous business establishments, hotels and schools. In 1950, these exhibitions were extended to outlying locations such as the Hoberg Hotel in Borrego Springs and the Carlsbad Hotel in Carlsbad.

== Headquarters ==
The San Diego Business Men's Art Club had grown in activities and public relations to such an extent that a headquarters and gallery were sorely needed. During World War II, the Fine Arts Society of San Diego was forced to evacuate its galleries in Balboa Park and move, originally to 2324 Pine Street, and then to 2030 Sunset Boulevard, a home which was a gift from Mr. and Mrs. Frank E. Marcy to the Fine Arts Society to use as its wartime temporary headquarters. Following the return of the Fine Arts Society to its galleries in Balboa Park after the war, the Sunset Galleries were left vacant. E. T. Price, at that time president of the Fine Arts Society, offered the use of the gallery at 2030 Sunset Boulevard for its headquarters and gallery, and many exhibitions, social affairs, classes, lectures, and educational and cultural meetings were held there. Exhibitions of the club's work were held continuously, with the show changed at monthly intervals. Visiting exhibitions were held, not only of paintings, but of photography and other arts and crafts. Field painting excursions continued under the supervision and instruction of one of the faculty members. During this time, Alfred E. R. Van de Veide, Carlos Verharen, J. Milford Ellison, J. Roland McNary, and Earl Schrack were added to the faculty, while Elsey Taft became curator.

In 1951, the membership voted to incorporate under the name of “The San Diego Men’s Art Institute" and to accept women as associate members. The membership promptly rose to more than fifty regular members and more than one hundred associate members. With the advent of women as associate members, activities increased markedly, and, with the Sunset galleries becoming available, increased quality of the work submitted for exhibitions was noted.

== Organization ==
San Diego Art Institute is a contemporary art center, focusing on the artists and audiences of Southern California/Baja Norte. Its core programs include rotating, curated exhibitions of regional contemporary art, as well as a premier artist and curator residency program. SDAI has a main exhibition space in Balboa Park, 8,000 square feet dedicated to contemporary exhibitions. As of November 2015, SDAI also has a secondary 3,000 square foot project space in Westfield Horton Plaza Mall, dedicated to hands-on art-making workshops, experimental performances, rotating exhibitions, and artist studios.

SDAI exhibits artwork by artists mainly living and working in the Southern California/Baja Norte region (Los Angeles to Tijuana). While past programs have focused solely on monthly regional juried exhibitions, SDAI has shifted their focus towards themed and curated exhibitions. Opportunities for artists are frequently posted on their website.

Past notable exhibitions include: "Millennial Pink" curated by Lissa Corona and Marina Grize, “Beyond Limits: Postglobal Mediations”, “Women’s Work: Masculinity and Gender in Contemporary Fiber Art” curated by Ginger Shulick Porcella, “Sweet Gongs Vibrating” curated by Amanda Cachia, “Universal Dissolvent”, “Ephemeral Objects” and the "Art of Photography Show."

Notable artists that have participated in exhibitions include: Angela Washko, Andrea Chung, Blane de St. Croix, Mary Mattingly, Pablo Helguera, Einar & Jamex de la Torre, Debby and Larry Kline, etc.

In 2014, SDAI instituted an artist-in-residence program. Past artists-in-residence include: Andrea Chung, Matthew Mahoney, Nina Preisendorfer, Cindy Santos Bravo, Vabianna Santos, Robert Andrade, Omar Lopex, Brian & Ryan, and Michelada Think Tank.

Past curators-in-residence include: Alex Young, Andy Horwitz, and Amanda Cachia.

== The House of Charm ==
The House of Charm was called the Indian Arts Building when it was originally created for the Panama–California Exposition in 1916. The lath and plaster structure was renamed the Russia and Brazil Building in 1917, the Exposition's second year. It acquired its current name, the House of Charm, during the California Pacific International Exposition in 1935. Like many other Exposition buildings within the Park, the House of Charm was taken over by the military during World War II. In 1996, because of deterioration, the building was torn down and rebuilt to its original appearance. Represented on the National Register of Historic Places, the House of Charm is now home to the San Diego Art Institutes's Museum of the Living Artist as well as the Mingei International Museum and three full-scale rehearsal spaces belonging to the Old Globe Theatre.

== Education ==
SDAI promotes multimedia art education through school art programs, summer camps, and individualized youth art education initiatives. They hire practicing artists making important contributions to their fields who have also demonstrated a vested interest in the capacity of art to empower young people. In 2015, SDAI started a Teen Summer Intensive, now housed at Coronado School of the Arts. SDAI also provides frequent opportunities for youth to exhibit their artwork in Balboa Park.

== Notes ==
1. The City of San Diego, Balboa Park Museums, Features and Attractions
2. The San Diego Art Institute Archives 2008
3. Maurice Braun, American Painter, 1877-1941
4. San Diego Art Institute Archives
5. Field, Timothy J. (1998). "Art colloquialism in context". The San Diego Art Institute Journal. 12 (2): 1–8.

== Bibliography ==
- Baldridge, Charlene. San Diego: Jewel of the California Coast. Northland. May 25, 2003. ISBN 0-87358-838-X
- Fernandes, Rachel. San Diego Art Institute employees are ready to lead. San Diego City Beat. June 20, 2017
- Dower, Rick. From deepest, darkest Balboa Park: our own Marlin Perkins. San Diego Business Journal, volume 11 Issue 38 Page 10(3), September 17, 1990
- Hudsen, Andrew. The Magic of Balboa Park: Special Millennium Edition. Photo Tour Books, Inc. ISBN 0-9653087-6-6
- Marshall, David. San Diego's Balboa Park, CA (Postcard History Series). Arcadia Publishing, July 30, 2007. ISBN 0-7385-4754-9.
- Martin, Don W & Betty Woo. San Diego: The Best of Sunshine City.DiscoverGuides: 2nd edition. May 21, 2002. ISBN 0-942053-37-0
- Puplava, Kathy. Trees and gardens of Balboa Park .California: City of San Diego Park and Recreation Dept (2001). ISBN 0-938711-73-3
- Sanders, Rebecca A. Day Outings from San Diego on a Tank of GasPremier Publishing: 4th edition. April 2004. ISBN 1-928905-00-5
