= Punkt Ø =

Coordinates: 59°25′28″N 10°36′36″E

- Established: 2006
- Location: Moss, Norway
- Type: Art Museum
- Director: Dag Aak Sveinar
- Public transit access: Moss Station
- Website: www.punkto.no

Punkt Ø AS is a Norwegian art institution founded in 2006 with Østfold county as its largest shareholder. The institutions goal is to promote knowledge and understanding for Norwegian and international contemporary art. Punkt Ø runs Galleri F 15 and Momentum, a Nordic biennial for contemporary art.
