= Association of MultiEthnic Americans =

American civil rights organization

The Association of MultiEthnic Americans (AMEA) is an international collaboration of community organizations. With dedication to advocacy and education on behalf of the mixed-race community, AMEA works to promote a community of acceptance and equality.

== History ==
On July 4, 1986, the Organizing Committee for a National Association of MultiEthnic Americans was formed by representatives of local mixed-race groups, which emerged during the late 1970s and early 1980s. These were the first groups to focus specifically on mixed-race identities. Many of these organizations, such as I-Pride (San Francisco Bay Area) and the Biracial Family Network (Chicago) formed after anti-miscegenation laws were struck down. With an increased amount of legally recognized interracial relationships, parents of mixed-race children organized and gave their children spaces to socialize together. After parents, multiracial adults and others began organizing, they began challenging the official classification of mixed-race individuals, particularly in connection with the public school system.

In November 1988, members of the Organizing Committee for a National Association of MultiEthnic Americans met in Berkeley, California and founded AMEA to serve as a national platform to advocate for their rights. I-Pride president Carlos A. Fernandez was elected president and Biracial Family Network president Ramona Douglass was elected vice president.

== Organizational work ==
There are three main areas of AMEA’s work: maintenance of a resource network with a competency around mixed-race issues; facilitating collaboration between organizations dedicated to multiethnic, multiracial and transracial adoptee issues; and conducting needs assessments to identify the unmet needs of the mixed-community and develop recommendations to service providers.

Most of AMEA’s events are organized by its local affiliates. These groups, concentrated in the west and Midwest, offers services ranging from cultural events to social support groups. AMEA's first major public event was the Loving Decision Conference in 1992 held in Washington, D.C. AMEA subsequently organized the first National Conference on the Multiracial Child in 2002 and another Loving Decision Conference in 2007.

In 2004, AMEA and Mavin Foundation partnered to launch The National Mixed Heritage Resource Center, a national clearing house of information related to the mixed-race community.

AMEA affiliate	Location
Biracial Family Network	Chicago, Illinois, U.S.
Getting Interracial Families Together (GIFT)	Montclair, New Jersey, U.S.
Honor Our New Ethnic Youth (HONEY)	Eugene, Oregon, U.S.
Interracial Family Circle (IFC)	Washington D.C., U.S.
Interracial Intercultural Pride (iPride)	San Francisco, California, U.S.
MOXHCA	Edmonton, AB Canada
Multiracial Americans of Southern California (MASC)	Los Angeles, California, U.S.
Oregon Council on Multiracial Affairs (OCMA)	Portland, Oregon, U.S.
The Topaz Club (TTC)

== 2000 United States Census ==
In 1989, AMEA issued a letter illustrating the concerns of their constituency to Congressman Thomas Sawyer, chairman of the House subcommittee monitoring the census. AMEA was subsequently invited to present testimony to the ‘Census, Statistics and Postal Personnel’ subcommittee. AMEA was represented by its president, Carlos A. Fernandez and executive board member Edwin Darden.

As with classification within the school system, federal classification of mixed-race individuals was criticized in the mid-1900s for not allowing a person to “check more than one box.” AMEA was appointed as the only federally recognized multiracial advocacy group to the “Census 2000 Advisory Committee” to explore possible solutions.

While public opinion was diverse, initially many advocacy groups supported one "multiracial" box for mixed-race individuals. Many media sources such as Mademoiselle in its article "What Race Am I?" urged its readers "to express an opinion on whether or not a 'Multiracial' category should be included in all federal record keeping, including the 2000 census."

AMEA was at the forefront of the Office of Management and Budgets (OMB) decision to revise its standards for collecting racial and ethnic data by allowing persons of multiple racial heritages to check "one or more races" on the 2000 Census Race Question. After much debate, the Federal Interagency Committee recommended allowing Census respondents to “check one or more boxes.”

AMEA retains a permanent seat on the census advisory committee.
