= Dennis Baxley =

American politician

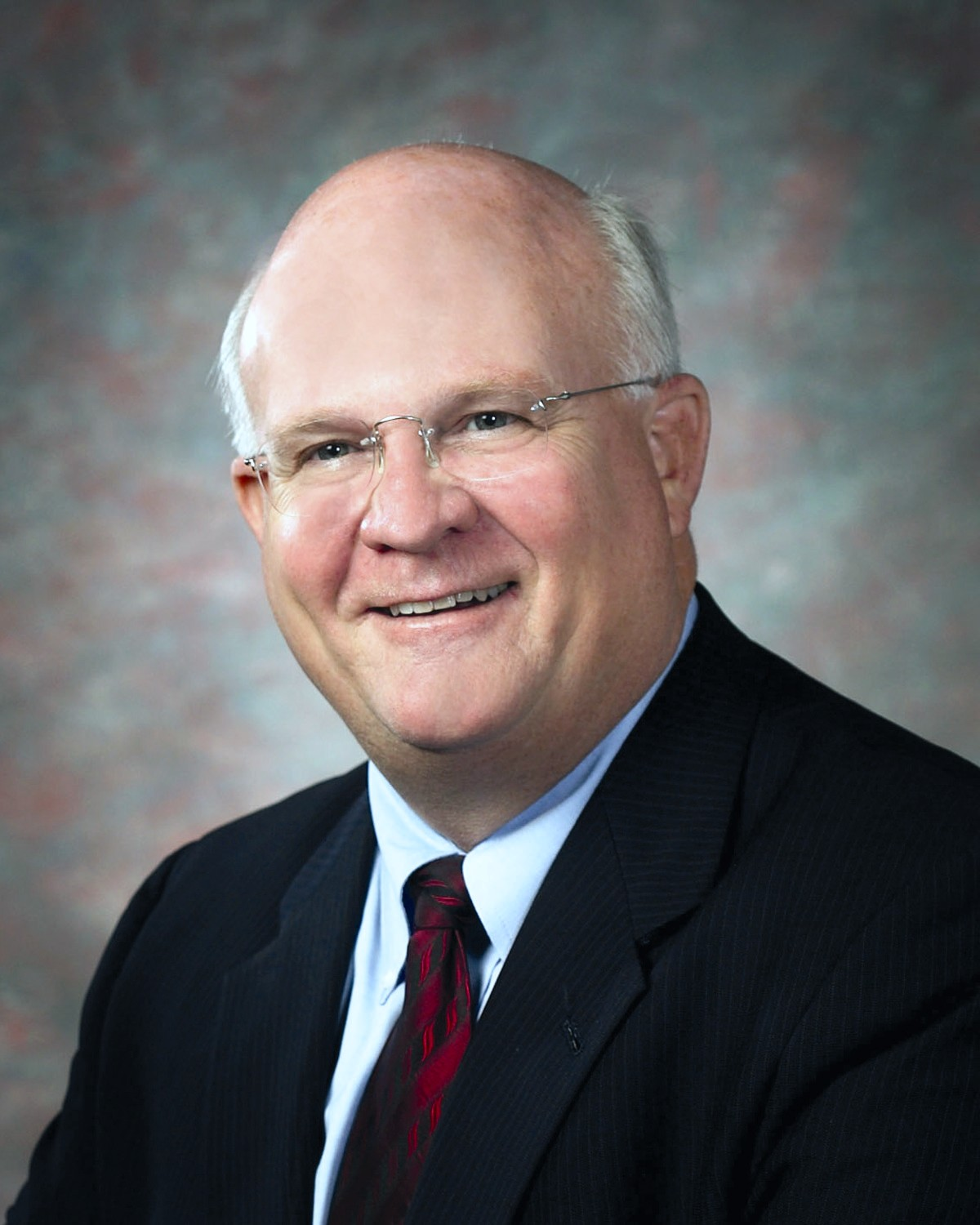
- Official portrait, 2007

President pro tempore of the Florida Senate
- In office November 22, 2022 – November 4, 2024
- Preceded by: Aaron Bean
- Succeeded by: Jason Brodeur

Member of the Florida Senate
- In office November 8, 2016 – November 5, 2024
- Preceded by: Redistricted
- Succeeded by: Keith Truenow
- Constituency: 12th district (2016–2022); 13th district (2022–2024)

Speaker pro tempore of the Florida House of Representatives
- In office November 21, 2006 – June 12, 2007
- Preceded by: Leslie Waters
- Succeeded by: Marty Bowen

Member of the Florida House of Representatives
- In office November 2, 2010 – November 8, 2016
- Preceded by: Kurt Kelly
- Succeeded by: Stan McClain
- Constituency: 24th district (2010–2012); 23rd district (2012–2016)
- In office November 7, 2000 – June 26, 2007
- Preceded by: George Albright
- Succeeded by: Kurt Kelly
- Constituency: 24th district

Personal details
- Born: August 22, 1952 (age 74) Ocala, Florida, U.S.
- Party: Republican
- Spouse: Ginette Begín
- Children: 5
- Education: College of Central Florida (AA); Florida State University (BA); Miami-Dade College (AS)

Dennis K. Baxley (born August 22, 1952) is a former state legislator in Florida who served in the Florida Senate from 2016 to 2024. A Republican, he represented the 12th district including Sumter County and parts of Lake County and Marion County in Central Florida. He previously served in the Florida House of Representatives, representing parts of Marion County from 2000 to 2007 and again from 2010 until his election to the Senate in 2016. He served on the Belleview City Commission and as its mayor.

Baxley has sponsored anti-LGBT legislation and stand your ground legislation, opposed a two-year moratorium on the sale of AR-15s, and delayed the Florida Slavery Memorial. He also opposes the removal of Confederate monuments and memorials. He was the sponsor of the failed Florida House Bill H-837, which would have allowed students to sue educators for not tolerating their views, and the successful Florida Parental Rights in Education Act, which prohibits the discussion of gender identity in elementary schools.

== Early life ==
Baxley is a fifth-generation Floridian He was born in Ocala and attended Central Florida Community College, graduating with an associate degree in 1972. He then attended Florida State University, receiving degrees in sociology and psychology in 1974. Following this, Baxley attended Miami-Dade Community College, where he received a degree in funeral service in 1975. He returned to Ocala, where he founded Hiers-Baxley Funeral Services.

Baxley is a descendant of a soldier who fought for the Confederate States of America during the American Civil War.

== Politics ==
Baxley was elected to the Belleview City Commission and later served as Mayor.

=== Florida House of Representatives ===
When incumbent State Representative George Albright, was unable to seek re-election in 2000 due to term limits, he ran to succeed him in the 24th District, which included central Marion County. He faced George Onett in the Republican primary, whom he defeated easily, winning 86% of the vote. In the general election, Baxley defeated Judy Johnson, the Democratic nominee, with 58% of the vote. When he ran for re-election in 2002, he encountered Lida Throckmorton, the Libertarian, whom he defeated in a landslide, with 77% of the vote. Baxley won re-election in 2004 without opposition. In 2006, he faced James Walker, an Iraq War veteran and the Democratic nominee, in his bid for re-election. During the course of the campaign, Walker was called back up for active service in Iraq, and considered exiting the campaign, but noted, "I think Marion County would be better off without Dennis Baxley." Baxley ended up defeating Walker by a wide margin, winning 56% of the vote to Walker's 44%.

When State Senator Nancy Argenziano resigned from her seat to accept an appointment to the Florida Public Service Commission, a special election was called to replace her. Baxley and fellow State Representative Charles Dean announced that they would resign from their seats in the legislature on May 1, 2007, to run to succeed her. Over the course of the campaign, Dean attacked Baxley for raising taxes, increasing insurance premiums, and allowing phone rates to skyrocket. Baxley lost to Dean in the Republican primary, receiving 44% of the vote to Dean's 56%.

When Kurt Kelly, who replaced Baxley in the Florida House of Representatives in a 2007 special election, opted to run for the United States House of Representatives rather than seek re-election, Baxley ran to succeed him. He won the Republican primary unopposed, and faced Michael Hageloh, the Democratic nominee and a businessman. This was Hageloh's first run for political office and his campaign was overwhelmingly self-funded. Baxley campaigned on his experience and institutional knowledge, saying, "I believe in recycling, so I guess I'm the green candidate. I believe I can recycle some of the experience I've learned and go there and make a difference for Marion County." Baxley defeated Hageloh in a landslide, winning 64% of the vote to Hageloh's 36%.

When legislative districts were redrawn in 2012, Baxley was moved into the 23rd District, which contained most of the district that he previously represented in the 24th District. He won both the primary and general elections unopposed. In 2014, Baxley was re-elected to the House without opposition.

While serving in the legislature, Baxley sponsored a stand-your-ground law that attracted attention in 2012 when George Zimmerman killed Trayvon Martin. Despite this, however, Baxley did not feel as though the legislation applied to the case, noting, "I still don't think it applies. Nothing in this statute authorizes 'pursuit, confront, provoke.'"

=== Florida Senate ===
Baxley announced that he intended to run for the Florida Senate in 2016 to replace term-limited senator Charles Dean, who defeated him in 2007. Baxley won his three-way Republican primary by just 633 votes. He faced no opposition in the general election.

In 2019, Baxley sponsored legislation that would require public schools to teach skepticism about evolution and about climate change.

In May 2019, Baxley was reported to use the Replacement theory in relation to the abortion debate in the United States. Speaking of Western Europe birthrates as a warning to Americans, he said; "When you get a birth rate less than 2 percent, that society is disappearing, and it’s being replaced by folks that come behind them and immigrate, don’t wish to assimilate into that society and they do believe in having children."

During the 2021 Florida Legislature session, Baxley filed the controversial bill Senate Bill 86. The bill, in its original form, required students to pursue a degree from an approved list of degrees that lead to jobs. Failure to do so could lead to reduction in Bright Futures students received. Proponents of the bill claimed it could help bring the world of education and work closer together. Opponents argued that the bill would remove choice in degree for lower income students and push the highest performers away from Florida colleges and Florida universities. The bill went through several revisions, slowly removing some of the more controversial language as it went through the committee process. Opposition came largely from students who would be affected. The Florida Senate voted 22-18 favorably on a final version that would create a job dashboard and put Bright Futures into general appropriations. The bill, however, died in the Florida House of Representatives.

In 2022, Baxley introduced a controversial bill into the Senate. The bill is known informally as the "Don't Say Gay" bill, which prohibits classroom instruction on sexual orientation or gender identity in kindergarten through grade 3. The legislation has been opposed by the American Bar Association, Equality Florida, and President Joe Biden. Despite that, in February 2022, the bill passed the Florida House. The House version of the bill (HB 1557) then passed the Florida Senate in March 2022, with Baxley in full support.

== Personal life ==
A devout Southern Baptist, he is a father of five including two adopted children.

Florida House of Representatives
Preceded by Leslie Waters	Speaker pro tempore of the Florida House of Representatives; 2006–2007	Succeeded by Marty Bowen
Florida Senate
Preceded by Aaron Bean	President pro tempore of the Florida Senate; 2022–2024	Succeeded by Jason Brodeur
