= Louisiana Science Education Act =

The Louisiana Science Education Act, Act 473 (SB733) of 2008 is a controversial anti-evolution law passed by the Louisiana Legislature on June 11, 2008 and signed into law by Governor Bobby Jindal on June 25. The act allows public school teachers to use supplemental materials in the science classroom which are critical of scientific theories such as evolution and global warming and to promote creationism as science. Louisiana was the first state to have passed a law of this type.

Proponents of the law claim that it is meant to promote critical thinking and improve education. State Senator Ben Nevers said the law is intended to allow educators to create an environment that "(promotes) critical thinking skills, logical analysis, and open and objective discussions of scientific theories such as evolution, the origins of life, global warming, and human cloning."

SB733 opens a backdoor to teaching creationism in public schools, which is illegal under federal law. Alan Leshner, the executive publisher of Science, condemned the bill as the "latest effort to insert religious, unscientific views into science classrooms." Leshner stated the bill would, "unleash an assault against scientific integrity, leaving students confused about science and unprepared to excel in a modern workforce."

In 2010, high school student Zack Kopplin launched a high-profile campaign sponsored by Louisiana State Senator Karen Carter Peterson to repeal the law. Kopplin's campaign has been endorsed by 78 Nobel laureates, the New Orleans City Council, and more than a dozen scientific and educational associations. Bills to repeal the LSEA have failed to advance past the Senate Education committee five years in a row from 2011 through 2015.

== Background to the bill ==
The Louisiana Science Education Act is an "academic freedom law" based on the Discovery Institute's academic freedom model statute. The LSEA allows teachers in public schools to use supplemental materials in the science classroom that are critical of established scientific theories "including, but not limited to, evolution, the origins of life, global warming and human cloning."

Senator Nevers originally pre-filed the bill as the Louisiana Education Freedom Act (SB 561), at the behest of the Louisiana Family Forum to allow creationism to be taught in public schools. "They (the Louisiana Family Forum) believe that scientific data related to creationism should be discussed when dealing with Darwin's theory. This would allow the discussion of scientific facts," Nevers said. The Louisiana Science Education Act, SB 733, introduced April 17, 2008, is a renumbered and renamed version of SB 561, which was introduced earlier by Senator Nevers. Gene Mills, president of the Louisiana Family Forum, states that the bill is necessary to allow teachers to "critically present" evidence and "quit choosing sides when it comes to teaching students this controversial subject matter."

Critics of the bill suggest that it is intended as an end-run around the federal ban on the teaching of creationism in public schools, and say that the sole purpose of the law is to provide legal cover to educators who want to include fundamentalist scriptural interpretations other than the science curriculum in relation to the teaching of evolution, in contravention of court rulings in cases such as Edwards v. Aguillard and Kitzmiller v. Dover, something opposed by the scientific community.

On June 3, 2008, The American Institute of Biological Sciences sent a letter to House Speaker Jim Tucker opposing SB 733. On June 20, 2008, AIBS and seven other societies sent a letter to Governor Bobby Jindal requesting that he veto SB733. The requesting societies included the American Institute of Biological Sciences, the American Ornithologists Union, the American Society of Mammalogists, the Botanical Society of America, the Natural Science Collections Alliance, the Society for Integrative and Comparative Biology, the Society of Systematic Biologists, and the Society for the Study of Evolution.

== Legislative history ==
=== Passage of Act ===
Senator Ben Nevers, Chairman of the Louisiana Senate Education Committee, a Bogalusa Democrat, filed the "Louisiana Academic Freedom Act," (SB 561) on March 21, 2008. The bill was heard by the Senate Education committee on April 17. When introducing his legislation to the education committee, Senator Nevers substituted the original bill with SB733, the "Louisiana Science Education Act" or LSEA. After hearing two proponents in addition to Senator Nevers and approximately twenty opponents, the Education committee voted in favor of the legislation. On April 22, the Education committee presented the substitute bill to the Senate. The bill was passed by the Senate on April 28 by a unanimous vote of 35 to 0.

The Louisiana House referred LSEA to the Committee on Education on April 30. The House Committee on Education reported the bill favorably on May 21 by a unanimous vote of 14 to 0. The full House passed the legislation by a vote of 94 to 3 on June 11, 2008.

On June 16 the Senate unanimously accepted the House's amendments. Governor Bobby Jindal signed the legislation into law on June 25 making the LSEA Act 473 of 2008.

=== Repeal attempts ===
Bills that would have repealed the LSEA were introduced by Senator Karen Carter Peterson as SB70 in 2011, SB374 in 2012, SB26 in 2013 and SB175 in 2014. SB70 failed to pass on a 1-5 vote by the Senate Education committee after an hour-long hearing. The bill was then deferred by the committee ending consideration on the legislation for the year. SB374 was rejected by the Senate Education committee in a 2-1 vote with four abstentions. The third attempt to repeal the measure met again with failure when the Senate Education Committee voted 3-2 to defer the bill on May 1, 2013. The fourth attempt was rejected in a 3-1 vote on April 24, 2014. The fifth attempt was rejected in a 4-3 vote on April 22, 2015.

== Criticism of bill ==
=== Backlash ===
The scientific community in the United States has called the Louisiana Science Education Act an "anti-science" law with the purpose of allowing creationism into public school science classrooms.

The Society for Integrative and Comparative Biology had planned to host a conference in New Orleans in 2011, but decided to change the location of the conference "in large part" because of the LSEA, stating that it was their "firm opinion ... that this law undermines the integrity of science and science education in Louisiana." They also announced that they would not consider hosting further conferences in New Orleans. The New Orleans Convention and Visitors Bureau estimated that losing the conference caused an economic loss to Louisiana of at least $2.7 million. SICB lifted their boycott in early 2013 after the New Orleans City Council and Orleans Parish School Board both rejected the teaching of creationism in science classes.

Prominent critic of the Louisiana Science Education Act Zack Kopplin has stated that the law "leaves our students at a disadvantage when competing for jobs in the global economy. To illustrate this, he often humorously refers to the fact that when you search creationism on Monster.com or CareerBuilder you get "zero jobs," while when you search biology, you find over 1000.

Professor of philosophy Barbara Forrest at Southeastern Louisiana University in Hammond, a prominent critic of the Discovery Institute and the intelligent design movement, has explained that she thinks the law itself passed because,

In Louisiana, we had no organizational framework to respond to [the Louisiana Science Education Act]. One of the ways that Florida, for example, has kept [creationism] out is they have a very active, well organized Florida Citizens for Science. At the time we didn't have that. I and a couple of people, very, very quickly, had to get something together. [Although] there weren't very many of us ... we did put up some opposition, but Louisiana Family Forum had been planning such a move probably since their founding in 1998.

Zack Kopplin began an effort to repeal the LSEA while he was a Senior in high school in 2010. His repeal bill was sponsored by Senator Karen Carter Peterson.

=== Creationism ===
The Louisiana Science Education Act has been characterized as a creationism law, because it singles out specific scientific theories, which happen to be politically controversial, for teachers to "critique and review" using "supplemental materials." The scientific theories in question include "evolution, the origins of life, global warming, and cloning."

Zack Kopplin explained:

You don't need a law to teach critical thinking. That's what science is. You need a law to teach creationism.

Barbara Forrest is also wary of the law because the Board of Elementary and Secondary Education's initial draft policy to implement the Louisiana Science Education Act was changed under pressure from a local conservative Christian group, the Louisiana Family Forum. The initial draft would have explicitly prohibited teaching religion under the guise of 'critical thinking' and using creationist materials in public school science classrooms. She added:

The initial version of the policy contained two crucial statements that would have prohibited school districts from doing what the legislative sponsors and creationist authors of the LA Science Education Act designed the law to allow them to do: (1) "Religious beliefs shall not be advanced under the guise of encouraging critical thinking"; and (2) "Materials that teach creationism or intelligent design or that advance the religious belief that a supernatural being created humankind shall be prohibited for use in science classes."

[President of the Louisiana Family Forum, Rev. Gene Mills] referred to these statements as expressing "religious hostility" and "a cheap shot." In doing so, he revealed his true intent concerning both the LSEA and the BESE policy: to promote and protect the religious agenda of the LA Family Forum and its Discovery Institute accomplices. If, as Mills keeps insisting, the LSEA were only intended to promote good science education and not to promote creationism, there would be no reason for him to object to the initial policy's prohibition against teaching "creationism or intelligent design or that advance the religious belief that a supernatural being created humankind.

In the revised policy introduced at the S/SPS Committee meeting on January 13, 2009, the first statement had been deleted prior to the meeting. To the second statement, another had been added: "Evaluations of supplementary materials shall be made without regard to the religious or non-religious beliefs and affiliations of the authors of supplementary materials." This new sentence was clearly added to prohibit any supplemental material from being challenged based on its having been authored by creationists.

The Americans United for Separation of Church and State is also worried about the process for parents to challenge supplemental materials brought into the classroom, because "the proposed procedure for reviewing challenged supplemental materials ... appears designed to provide a forum for promoting creationism. Barbara Forrest is the current Secretary for Americans United.

Also, supporters of the law have openly admitted that its purpose is to bring creationism into public school science classrooms. In July 2010, the Livingston Parish school board discussed using this law to teach creationism in public school science class. The National Center for Science Education reported,

The director of curriculum for [Livingston Parish] reportedly told the board that, under the Louisiana Science Education Act, schools are allowed to present "critical thinking and creationism" in science classes. The response from the board was enthusiastic, with David Tate asking, "Why can't we get someone with religious beliefs to teach creationism?" and Clint Mitchell adding, "Teachers should have the freedom to look at creationism and find a way to get it into the classroom."

James Gill, who writes for the New Orleans Times Picayune criticized a caveat from the law text stating that it should not be construed "to promote any religious doctrine, promote discrimination for or against a particular set of religious beliefs or promote discrimination for or against religion or nonreligion." He pointed out that the line was "written with a nod and a wink, and it just goes to show how much craftier the obscurantists have become." This wording is a religion disclaimer from the Discovery Institute's model bill and is in all of the different variants of the bill in every state where it has been introduced.

== Repeal effort ==
In early June 2010, a student at Baton Rouge Magnet High School, Zack Kopplin, launched a campaign to repeal the law as his high school senior project. He started working on a repeal with Barbara Forrest, who was an expert witness at the Kitzmiller v. Dover trial and was responsible for demonstrating intelligent design was simply creationism dressed up to appear scientific.

According to Kopplin, he is organizing Louisiana "students, scientists, clergy, teachers, and business leaders in support of repealing the Louisiana Science Education Act."

They convinced Senator Karen Carter Peterson, a Democrat from New Orleans, to sponsor their repeal bill. Representative Walt Leger III, who represents part of Senator Peterson's district, agreed to handle the legislation in the House. Senator Peterson introduced SB 70 to repeal the Louisiana Science Education Act on April 14, 2011.

The repeal effort gained support nationally and internationally. It is supported by 78 Nobel laureate scientists, the City of New Orleans, the American Association for the Advancement of Science, the largest general science organization in the world with over 10 million members, and many other organizations.

SB 70 was heard in the Senate Education Committee on May 26, 2011. After a heated debate, where in response to being presented the Nobel laureate letter, Senator Julie Quinn declared she was "tired of seeing little letters behind everyone's names," the Senate Education Committee voted 5-1 to defer action on SB 70, in effect killing it. The sole vote for SB 70 was Senator Yvonne Dorsey.

The bill was introduced and rejected again from 2012 through 2015, see section Repeal attempts. In 2013 Kopplin said about Bobby Jindal: "I expect this law bothers him as much as it bothers me. He's a Brown biology major."

=== Creationism ===
Nine academic freedom bills were proposed in various state legislatures in 2011. The effort to repeal the Louisiana Science Education Act may have had an effect in dampening the pressure to pass those bills.

Also, the Louisiana Coalition for Science was able to stop two new efforts to put creationism in Louisiana classrooms after the passage of the Louisiana Science Education Act. First, they convinced the Louisiana Board of Elementary and Secondary Education to adopt new biology books after creationists attempted to have the books thrown out. Then they also succeeded in killing a Louisiana House bill (HB 580) which was meant to weaken the Board of Elementary and Secondary Education's oversight of public school biology books and supplementary materials.

== See also ==
- Academic Freedom bills
- Discovery Institute intelligent design campaigns
- Critical Analysis of Evolution
- Academic Bill of Rights
- Edwards v. Aguillard
- Dover v. Kitzmiller
- Barbara Forrest
