= Meffert =

Meffert is a German surname. Notable people with the surname include:

- Chris Meffert, American politician
- Dominik Meffert, German tennis player
- Greg Meffert, New Orleans technology chief
- Jim Meffert, Minnesota politician and executive
- Uwe Mèffert, German designer of mechanical puzzles
- William C. Meffert (1842–1918), American politician in Wisconsin
