= Zack Kopplin =

American church and state separation activist

- Born: Zachary Sawyer Kopplin; July 20, 1993 (age 32); Baton Rouge, Louisiana, U.S.
- Occupation: Activist

Zachary "Zack" Sawyer Kopplin (born July 20, 1993) is an American political activist, journalist, and television personality from Louisiana. Kopplin has campaigned to keep creationism out of public school science classrooms and been involved with other separation of church and state causes. He has opposed school vouchers because they provide public money to schools which may teach creationism. As a high school student, he organized seventy-eight Nobel laureate scientists in a campaign against the Louisiana Science Education Act, a creationism law. He is also involved with science funding policy and curriculum and textbook policy. His new campaign calls for launching a Second Giant Leap for Humankind, calling for Barack Obama to invest $1 trillion in research and education.

Kopplin has been interviewed on HBO's Real Time with Bill Maher, where Bill Maher noted, on the show, that Kopplin was the youngest guest ever to appear on his show. MSN.com called Kopplin the Doogie Howser of political activists. Kopplin has been featured by numerous international media outlets that include Vogue, Mashable, The New York Times, the Washington Post, io9, Slate, the Huffington Post, Moyers and Company, MSNBC, NPR, and Public Radio International.

== Personal life ==
Kopplin was born in Baton Rouge, Louisiana. His parents are Andrea D. Neighbours and Andy Kopplin, who is the first deputy mayor and chief administrative officer for the City of New Orleans. Andy Kopplin was chief of staff for Governors Murphy J. Foster, Jr. and Kathleen Blanco and founded the Louisiana Recovery Authority under Blanco.

Zack Kopplin graduated from Baton Rouge Magnet High School of Baton Rouge, Louisiana in 2011 and from Rice University in Houston, Texas in 2015.

On NPR's Science Friday, Kopplin stated that he was born with anosmia, meaning he does not have a sense of smell.

== Education activism ==
=== Louisiana Science Education Act ===
As a senior at Baton Rouge Magnet High School, in Louisiana, he launched a campaign to repeal the Louisiana Science Education Act, which has been described by the international science community as a creationism law. Kopplin ran his campaign through his RepealCreationism website.

Kopplin joined with Louisiana State Senator Karen Carter Peterson, a Democrat from New Orleans and chair of the Louisiana Democratic Party who sponsored two attempts to repeal the Louisiana Science Education Act. Peterson vowed to keep sponsoring bills, “until we defeat this law.”

With the help of Nobel laureate chemist, Harry Kroto, Kopplin gathered the support of 78 Nobel laureate scientists, who endorsed the repeal effort. The repeal is also supported by many other prominent scientists including Kenneth Miller.

Kopplin gathered the support of major science organizations behind the repeal including the American Association for the Advancement of Science, the largest science organization in the world with over 10 million members. He also gathered endorsements from the Clergy Letter Project and the New Orleans City Council.

=== Science textbooks ===
Kopplin played a major role in convincing the Louisiana Board of Elementary and Secondary Education to adopt new life science textbooks. After the new textbooks were adopted, the Baton Rouge Advocate wrote an editorial calling the high school senior "the newest giant-killer in state education policy."

Kopplin spearheaded a campaign to prevent attempts by Louisiana legislators to reverse the board's decision.

=== School vouchers ===
Kopplin has also played a role in the discussion over education reform in America. He has identified and exposed a number of the schools in Louisiana's school voucher program using creationist curricula or teaching creationism. Kopplin worked with MSNBC's Melissa Harris-Perry Show to expose over 300 creationist voucher schools nationwide.

=== Second Giant Leap ===
In 2013, Kopplin, along with Louisiana-based investigative journalist Lamar White, launched Second Giant Leap for Humankind, a political action committee which advocates for $1 trillion in new funding to be appropriated to scientific research and development and also an end to denialist legislation. Kopplin wrote an open letter to U.S. President Barack Obama asking him to support the Second Giant Leap campaign.

Kopplin debated Wall Street Journal editorial board member Stephen Moore on the return on investment for funding science while on HBO's Real Time with Bill Maher. After Kopplin pointed out that Moore was not a scientist, when Moore questioned National Science Foundation grants, the clip was picked up by Upworthy and went viral.

=== Michele Bachmann ===
According to the Huffington Post, Kopplin challenged Michele Bachmann to back up statements she made about Nobel laureate scientists supporting creationism. Kopplin made his challenge on the basis of the Nobel laureate scientists who supported his anti-creationism campaign. The New Orleans Gambit followed up on this question while she was in New Orleans.

== Awards and recognition ==
Kopplin is the National Center for Science Education’s 2012 Friend of Darwin Award Winner with Judy Scotchmoor and also the winner of the 2012 Hugh M. Hefner First Amendment Award in Education. He is the second person to win both the Friend of Darwin Award and the Hefner First Amendment Award. New Orlean's Gambit Weekly named him the 38th largest newsmaker in New Orleans in 2011. The Houston Chronicle named Kopplin as one of the most fascinating people living in Houston. In 2014, Kopplin received the American Society for Biochemistry and Molecular Biology's Howard Schachman Public Service Award and the LSU Manship School of Journalism's Courage and Justice Award. Kopplin even helped inspire a Doonesbury cartoon about Louisiana’s law. Kopplin was named a Truthdigger of the Week in December 2012, by Truthdig, a progressive website. Kopplin is also a Melissa Harris-Perry "Foot Soldier", as reported on her show.

== See also ==
- Academic Freedom bills
- Barbara Forrest
- Science education
