= Anti-evolution legislation =

American legislation critiquing evolution

A number of anti-evolution bills have been introduced in the United States Congress and State legislatures since 2001. Purporting to support academic freedom (therefore calling them Academic Freedom bills), supporters have contended that teachers, students, and college professors face intimidation and retaliation when discussing scientific criticisms of evolution, and therefore require protection. Critics of the legislation have pointed out that there are no credible scientific critiques of evolution. An investigation in Florida of the allegations of intimidation and retaliation found no evidence that it had occurred. The vast majority of the bills have been unsuccessful, with the one exception being Louisiana's Louisiana Science Education Act, which was enacted in 2008.

Based largely upon language drafted by the Discovery Institute, from language originally drafted for the Santorum Amendment, the common goal of these bills has been to expose more students to articles and videos that criticize evolution, most of which have been produced by advocates of intelligent design or Biblical creationism.

== Santorum Amendment ==
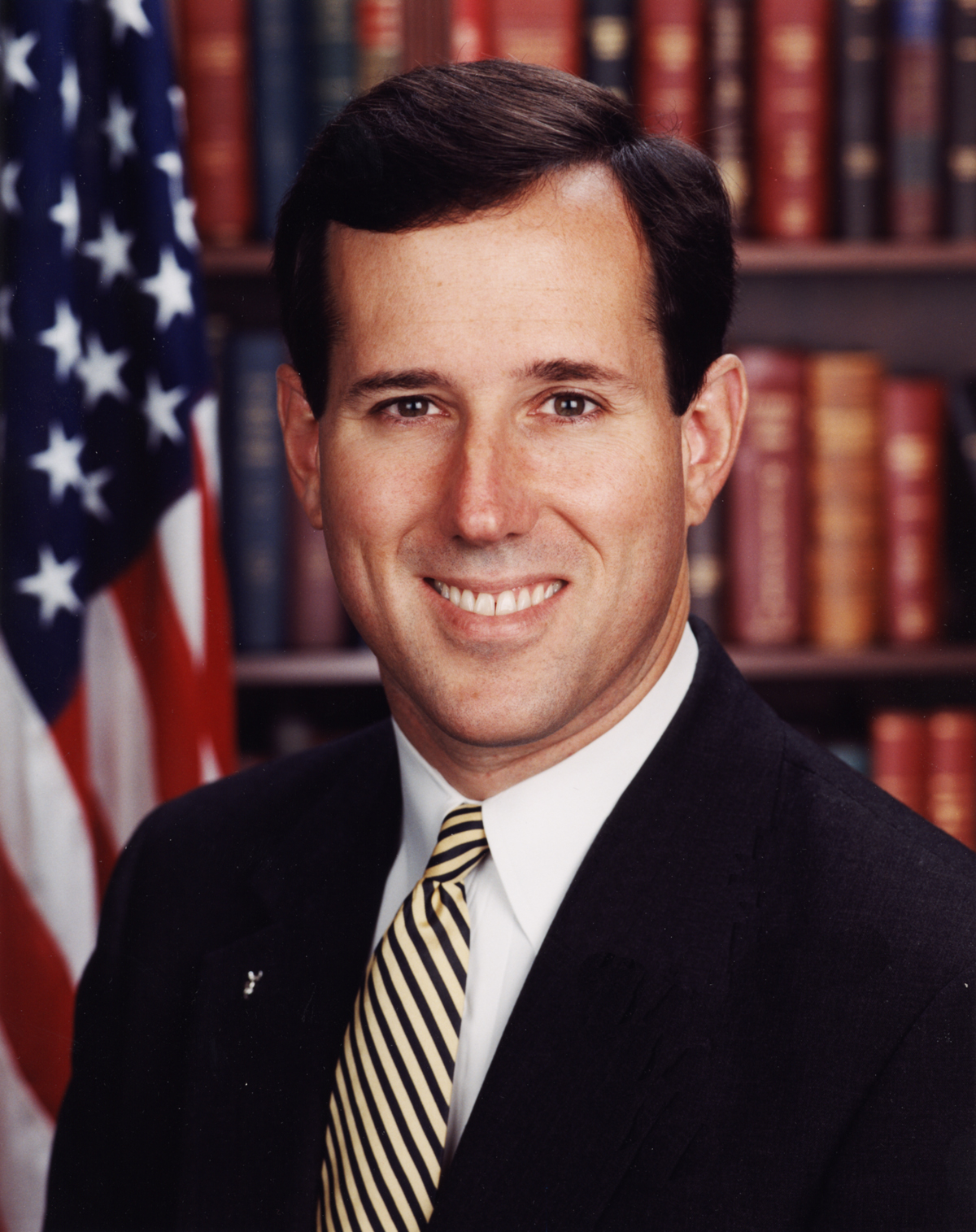
Senator Rick Santorum, sponsor of the Santorum Amendment

In 2001 former Republican United States Senator Rick Santorum from Pennsylvania proposed an amendment, to the education funding bill which became known as the No Child Left Behind Act, which promoted the teaching of intelligent design while questioning the academic standing of evolution in U.S. public schools. The language of this amendment was crafted in part by the Discovery Institute's Center for Science and Culture, with Phillip E. Johnson, founding adviser of the Discovery Institute's Center for Science and Culture, and "father" of the intelligent design movement, assisting Santorum in phrasing the amendment. It portrayed evolution as generating "much continuing controversy" and being not widely accepted, using the Discovery Institute's Teach The Controversy method.

The Conferees recognize that a quality science education should prepare students to distinguish the data and testable theories of science from religious or philosophical claims that are made in the name of science. Where topics are taught that may generate controversy (such as biological evolution), the curriculum should help students to understand the full range of scientific views that exist, why such topics may generate controversy, and how scientific discoveries can profoundly affect society.

— Final text of the Santorum Amendment as included in the Conference Report.

On June 14, 2001, the amendment was passed as part of the education funding bill by the Senate on a vote of 91-8. This was hailed as a major victory by proponents of intelligent design; for instance an email newsletter by the Discovery Institute contained the sentence "Undoubtedly this will change the face of the debate over the theories of evolution and intelligent design in America ... It also seems that the Darwinian monopoly on public science education, and perhaps the biological sciences in general, is ending."

Scientists and educators feared that by singling out biological evolution as very controversial, the amendment could create the impression that a substantial scientific controversy about evolution exists, leading to a lessening of academic rigor in science curricula. A coalition of 96 scientific and educational organizations signed a letter urging that the amendment be stricken from the final bill, which it was, but intelligent design supporters on the conference committee preserved it in the bill's legislative history.

== Overview ==
Rather than calling for teaching intelligent design or Bible-based creationism (as previous legislative attempts have), the bills make no mention of these subjects. They instead describe evolution as controversial and attempt to bar school administrators from interfering with teachers who describe purported flaws in the theory. This runs contrary to the overwhelming scientific consensus, which holds that there is no debate about the core principles of evolution: the only credible, and a thoroughly tested, scientific explanation for the development and diversification of all life on Earth.

Tom Hutton, a senior staff lawyer for the National School Boards Association, stated that while state legislators have a legal right to craft laws that affect districts' policies as a general rule, he believes that some decisions are better left to local officials. He further suggested that these proposed bills, if enacted, could face difficult legal challenges. He further stated that despite their language stating that they are not promoting religious views, and wording to promote "scientific" rather than religious critiques, courts are likely to question the motives behind these bills, and their specific focus on evolution, and draw a conclusion as to "what's going on here."

Michael Simpson, a lawyer for the National Education Association stated that courts have generally refused to afford significant free-speech protections to teachers for in-class remarks. He further offered the opinion that the legality of these measures would depend on a number of unknowns, such as how the critical views of evolution-critical views were presented, and possibly the degree of congruence between them and other state policies, such as state science curriculum.

A variety of groups, such as the National Center for Science Education and Anti-Defamation League, criticized and are publicly opposed to the "Academic Freedom bills."

== Alabama bills ==
Between 2004 and 2006, a series of unsuccessful anti-evolution 'Academic freedom' bills were introduced in the Alabama Legislature.

On April 8, 2004, the Alabama Senate unanimously passed SB336, the "Academic Freedom Act." The bill would have given teachers at public institutions "the affirmative right and freedom to present scientific, historical, theoretical, or evidentiary information pertaining to alternative theories or points of view on the subject of origins" and gives students the right to hold a "particular position on origins, so long as he or she demonstrates acceptable understanding of course materials." Before passage, it was amended so that "[t]he rights and privileges contained in this act do not apply to the presentation of theoretical information unless it is accompanied by scientific, historical, or evidentiary information." On May 17, 2004, the Alabama House adjourned the 2004 legislative session without voting on the bill, allowing it to lapse.

On February 8, 2005, a pair of virtually identical bills were simultaneously introduced in the Alabama Senate and House (HB352 and SB240), again under the description of "The Academic Freedom Act." These bills purported to protect the right of teachers "to present scientific critiques of prevailing scientific theories" and the right of students to "hold positions regarding scientific views". In an attempt to avert Establishment Clause concerns, the bills both stated that "[n]othing in this act shall be construed as promoting any religious doctrine, promoting discrimination for or against a particular set of religious beliefs, or promoting discrimination for or against religion or non-religion." On April 5, 2005, a third, near-identical bill (also dubbed the "Academic Freedom Act") was introduced in the Alabama House (HB 716). On May 3, 2005, the legislative session closed without passing any of these three bills, so that they lapsed.

On January 10, 2006, another pair of identical anti-evolution bills (HB106 and SB45), closely resembling the previous bills, were introduced in the Alabama legislature, again under the description of "The Academic Freedom Act". On April 18, 2006 the Alabama Legislature again adjourned without passing them, again allowing them to lapse.

On April 24, 2008, David Grimes introduced an 'Academic Freedom' bill (HB 923) into the Alabama House and it was referred to the Education Policy Committee. It died in committee on May 7.

On February 3, 2009, Grimes introduced another 'Academic Freedom' bill (HB 300) which was again referred to the House Education Policy Committee. It died in committee with the end of the legislative session on May 15.

== Arizona bills ==
On December 11, 2025, Arizona State Senator Dave Farnsworth prefiled a bill for the 2026 Senate session (SB1025) that would bar instruction in evolution if not accompanied by concurrent instruction in intelligent design. In subsequent statements made to the press, Farnsworth clarified that he saw intelligent design as equivalent to creationism, saying, "If it were up to me, I would just call it creationism."

== Oklahoma bills ==
In early 2006 Representative Sally Kern introduced an anti-evolution 'Academic Freedom' bill (HB2107) into the Oklahoma House, which passed it by a vote of 77-10 on March 2, 2006. Also in 2006 Senator Daisy Lawler introduced another anti-evolution bill, based upon language in the Santorum Amendment, in the Oklahoma Senate. Both bills (and two further, unrelated, anti-evolution bills) lapsed with the end of the 2006 legislative session.

In February 2009 a bill titled the 'Scientific Education and Academic Freedom Act' (SB 320) was introduced by Senator Randy Brogdon and died in committee the Oklahoma Senate. The bill is nearly identical to the Act passed in 2008 in Louisiana.

== Maryland bill ==
A bill (HB1531) was introduced into the Maryland House of Delegates on February 16, 2006, to enact a "Teachers Academic Freedom Act" and a "Faculty Academic Freedom Act", that closely resembled the 2006 Alabama bills. The bill lapsed with the end of the 2006 legislative session.

== New Mexico bills ==
In January 2007, two identical bills (HB 506 and SB 371) "relating to public education; providing for school science content standards and rules regarding the teaching of theories of biological origins" were introduced into the New Mexico Legislature and Senate by Representative W. C. "Dub" Williams and Senator Steve Komadina. The bills died with the end of legislative session on March 17, 2007.

In February 2009, an identical bill was again introduced, this time by Senator Kent L. Cravens in the New Mexico Senate. Although it does not mention the phrase "academic freedom", the National Center for Science Education described the bill as "clearly in the mold of the recent spate of anti-evolution 'academic freedom' bills". A Public Education Department analysis of the bill found that "[a]lthough the bill's definition of 'scientific information' excludes information derived from religious or philosophical writings, beliefs or doctrines", the bill "goes on to say that scientific information may have religious or philosophical implications and remain scientific in nature", which led to the conclusion that "this point would allow the teaching of theories of biological origins such as intelligent design or creationism."

On March 21, 2009, the bill died in committee when the legislature adjourned.

== Linkage with Expelled film ==
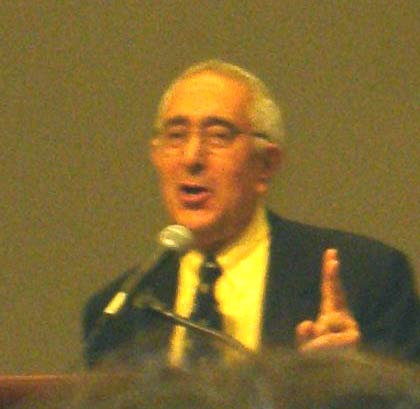
Expelled presenter Ben Stein, who stated "Love of God and compassion and empathy leads you to a very glorious place. Science leads you to killing people."

Pre-release screenings for legislators of the controversial film Expelled: No Intelligence Allowed, which portrays proponents of intelligent design as being "persecuted", have been presented by actor Ben Stein. There were special showings for legislators from Florida and Missouri to promote Academic Freedom bills in those states.

The Florida showing was at the invitation of that Florida bill's House sponsor, Representative Alan Hays, on March 12, 2008. It was a private screening restricted to legislators, their spouses, and their legislative aides. The press and public were excluded. When the House general counsel was asked if that was legal under the Florida Sunshine Law, Hays said that it was technically legal as long as they just watched the film without discussing the issue or arranging any future votes. Commenting on this, and the controversy over Roger Moore of the Orlando Sentinel previously managing to view the film against the wishes of the film company, House Democratic leader Dan Gelber of Miami Beach said, "It's kind of an irony: The public is expelled from a movie called Expelled." The screening was attended by about 100 people, but few were legislators, and the majority of legislators stayed away.

Shortly before the film was released on April 18, 2008, the producer of the film, Walt Ruloff, held a press conference on April 15 at The Heritage Foundation in Washington, D.C. Ruloff announced his plans to use the Expelled film as part of a campaign to pass academic freedom bills in a variety of American states.

== Florida bills ==
On 29 February 2008, Senator Ronda Storms introduced an Academic Freedom bill (SB2692) in the Florida Senate, which closely resembled both the Discovery Institute model statute and the previous Alabama bills. Its sponsor in the Florida House of Representatives (as HB1483) was Representative Alan Hays, who claimed that the bill was simply drafted to allow teachers and students to discuss "the full range" of problems and ideas surrounding Darwin's theory without fear of punishment. Hays and Storms were unable to name any teachers in Florida who have been disciplined for being critical of evolution in the science classroom. Hays said, "I want a balanced policy. I want students taught how to think, not what to think. There are problems with evolution. Have you ever seen a half-monkey, half human?" DI attorney Casey Luskin's statement at a press conference supporting the bill that, in his personal opinion, Intelligent Design constitutes "scientific information" (which the bill explicitly permits) was taken by the Miami Herald as an admission that "Intelligent Design could more easily be brought up in public-school science classrooms" under the proposed law. The American Civil Liberties Union also expressed concerns that these bills might make it easier to teach intelligent design as science in public schools. The bills were also opposed by Chemistry Nobel Prize-winner Harold Kroto who said, "it's an abuse of position not to teach science correctly to children".

The Senate bill was later amended to define "scientific information" as "germane current facts, data, and peer-reviewed research specific to the topic of chemical and biological evolution as prescribed in Florida's Science Standards." Storms refused to answer repeated direct questions from senate Democrats as to whether teachers would be permitted to teach Intelligent design under her bill and whether she believes that intelligent design meets its criteria for 'scientific information'. The bill has also been criticized for its inconsistency in only protecting the freedom of teachers to discuss anti-evolution arguments, but not other controversies (such as birth control and abortion), but when Democrats introduced a proposal to have the bill's protection extended to sex-education Storms had it voted down. The House bill underwent substantial modification and, as amended, requires "Critical Analysis of Evolution" to be taught. An attempt by Senator Storms to ease the bill's passage by substituting the heavily amended House version failed to win acceptance in the Senate, leaving two incompatible bills, which died with the end of the legislative session on May 2.

== Louisiana act ==
A bill (SB561) named the "Louisiana Academic Freedom Act," was pre-filed on March 21, 2008, in the Louisiana Senate by the Education Committee chair, Ben Nevers, a Bogalusa Democrat. While its name is the same as the Florida, Alabama and Discovery Institute bills, the Louisiana version is modeled on a policy adopted in 2006 by the Ouachita Parish School Board with the backing of the pro-creationism Louisiana Family Forum (LFF). The bill contends that "the teaching of some scientific subjects, such as biological evolution, the chemical origins of life, global warming, and human cloning, can cause controversy, and that some teachers may be unsure of the expectations concerning how they should present information on such subjects," and extends permission to Louisiana's teachers to "help students understand, analyze, critique, and review in an objective manner the scientific strengths and scientific weaknesses of existing scientific theories pertinent to the course being taught."

Nevers states that he was asked to sponsor the bill by the LFF. Gene Mills, executive director of the Louisiana Family Forum, stated that a bill is needed that makes it easier for teachers to delve into criticism of Charles Darwin's theory of evolution. However, in introducing the LFF-suggested bill he also stated that the LFF "believe that scientific data related to creationism should be discussed when dealing with Darwin's theory." Barry W. Lynn, executive director of Americans United for Separation of Church and State described the bill as "all about God in biology class".

On April 21, 2008, Representative Frank Hoffman, who was the assistant superintendent of the Ouachita Parish school system at the time it adopted the LFF-backed policy, introduced an identical bill into the Louisiana House of Representatives (HB1168). The next day, references to evolution, global warming and other subjects were stripped from the senate bill and replaced with calls for more general changes in science classes, and it was renamed the "Louisiana Science Education Act" (and renumbered SB733), and was passed unanimously on April 28, 2008. On June 11, 2008, the House bill was passed by a vote of 94-3. In response, Americans United noted that Louisiana legislators have repeatedly tried to water down the teaching of evolution, with previous attempts having been deemed unconstitutional by the Supreme Court of the United States, and suggest that this legislation "opens the door to teaching creationism in public schools, an action that is likely to spark litigation".

On June 12, 2008, the day after the House bill passed, "concerned parents, teachers and scientists" formed Louisiana Coalition for Science, "[i]n response to numerous attacks on science education in the Bayou State". Founding members include prominent philosopher and critic of the intelligent design movement Barbara Forrest and veteran biology teacher Patsye Peebles.

In late June 2008, Louisiana governor Bobby Jindal signed the bill into law.

The legislation has been criticized by the American Society for Biochemistry and Molecular Biology and the Society of Vertebrate Paleontology, with the latter calling for its repeal.

Conservative commentator John Derbyshire questioned the constitutionality of the law, and its likely effects:

Some local school board will take the Act as a permit to bring religious instruction into their science classes. That will irk some parents. Those parents will sue. There will be a noisy and expensive federal lawsuit, possibly followed by further noisy and expensive appeals. The school board will inevitably lose. The property owners of that school district will take the financial hit.

In a December 2008 Scientific American article Glenn Branch and Eugenie Scott stated:

In the meantime, it is clear why the Louisiana Science Education Act is pernicious: it tacitly encourages teachers and local school districts to mis-educate students about evolution, whether by teaching creationism as a scientifically credible alternative or merely by misrepresenting evolution as scientifically controversial. Vast areas of evolutionary science are for all intents and purposes scientifically settled; textbooks and curricula used in the public schools present precisely such basic, uncomplicated, uncontroversial material. Telling students that evolution is a theory in crisis is—to be blunt—a lie.

== Missouri bills ==
On April 1, 2008, representative Robert Wayne Cooper introduced a bill to add a "new section [into state law] relating to teacher academic freedom to teach scientific evidence regarding evolution" into the Missouri House of Representatives (HB2554). It would require educational authorities to "endeavor to create an environment within public elementary and secondary schools that encourages students to explore scientific questions, learn about scientific evidence, develop critical thinking skills, and respond appropriately and respectfully to differences of opinion about controversial issues, including such subjects as the teaching of biological and chemical evolution" and forbid them from "prohibit[ing] any teacher in a public school system of this state from helping students understand, analyze, critique, and review in an objective manner the scientific strengths and scientific weaknesses of theories of biological or chemical evolution." Previously in 2004, Cooper had introduced two unsuccessful bills (HB 911 and HB 1722) that called for equal time for intelligent design in Missouri schools.

The bill was passed by the House Committee on Elementary and Secondary Education on April 30, 2008, but died when the Missouri legislative session ended on May 16, 2008.

On February 10, 2009, Representative Robert Wayne Cooper introduced a bill (HB 656) to add a "new section relating to teacher academic freedom to teach scientific evidence regarding evolution" to existing legislation. It died, without having been assigned to a committee, with the end of the legislative session on May 15.

== Michigan bills ==
On April 30, 2008, a bill on "academic freedom to teach evidence regarding controversial scientific subjects" (HB 6027) was introduced in the Michigan House of Representatives by representative John Moolenaar. On June 3, 2008, an identical bill (SB 1361) was introduced into the Michigan Senate. Both bills later died in committee.

== North Dakota bills ==
On January 24, 2025, state senator Michael Dwyer introduced a bill requiring intelligent design be included in public school curricula as "a viable scientific theory." It was sent to the committee for education before failing on the second reading on February 24.

== South Carolina bill ==
A bill (SB 1386) was introduced in the South Carolina Senate on May 15, 2008 by Senator Michael L. Fair to amend the state's education code to provide:

The State Board of Education, superintendents of public school districts, and public school administrators may not prohibit a teacher in a public school of this State from helping his students understand, analyze, critique, and review the scientific strengths and weaknesses of biological and chemical evolution in an objective manner. This act does not condone the promotion of religious or nonreligious doctrine, the promotion of discrimination for or against a particular set of religious beliefs or nonreligious beliefs, or the promotion of discrimination for or against religion or nonreligion. By no later than September 1, 2008, the State Department of Education shall notify district superintendents of the provisions of this act, and each superintendent shall then disseminate to all employees within his district a copy of the provisions of this act.

The National Center for Science Education described the bill as "aimed at undermining the teaching of evolution".

Jim Foster, a spokesman for the state Department of Education, disputed the need for the bill:

Science teachers are already free to discuss science. So unless the intent is to introduce content that's not scientific, it's difficult to see why we need this.

The bill died in committee when the South Carolina legislature adjourned on June 5, 2008.

== Iowa bill ==
On February 3, 2009, a bill for an "Evolution Academic Freedom Act" was introduced into the Iowa Senate, by State Representative Rod Roberts, R-Carroll. More than 200 faculty members at 20 Iowa colleges signed a statement opposing a proposed state law:

It is misleading to claim that there is any controversy or dissent within the vast majority of the scientific community regarding the scientific validity of evolutionary theory ... 'academic freedom' for alternative theories is simply a mechanism to introduce religious or nonscientific doctrines into our science curriculum.

Glenn Branch of the National Center for Science Education said that the Iowa statement represented the first organized effort by college faculty members throughout a state to oppose this creationist strategy. It died in committee on March 13, 2009.

== West Virginia bill ==
On January 23, 2024, the State Senate of West Virginia passed Senate Bill SB 280 by a vote of 31 - 2 that states that "No public school board, school superintendent, or school principal shall prohibit a public school classroom teacher from discussing or answering questions from students about scientific theories of how the universe and/or life came to exist." However, the original version specified "intelligent design" rather than "scientific theories", and specified "teach" rather than "discuss" or "answer". The bill was passed on April 23, 2024 and went into effect 90 days later, on June 7, 2024.

== See also ==
- Academic Bill of Rights
- Critical Analysis of Evolution
- Discovery Institute intelligent design campaigns
