= Aaron Bean =

American politician (born 1967)

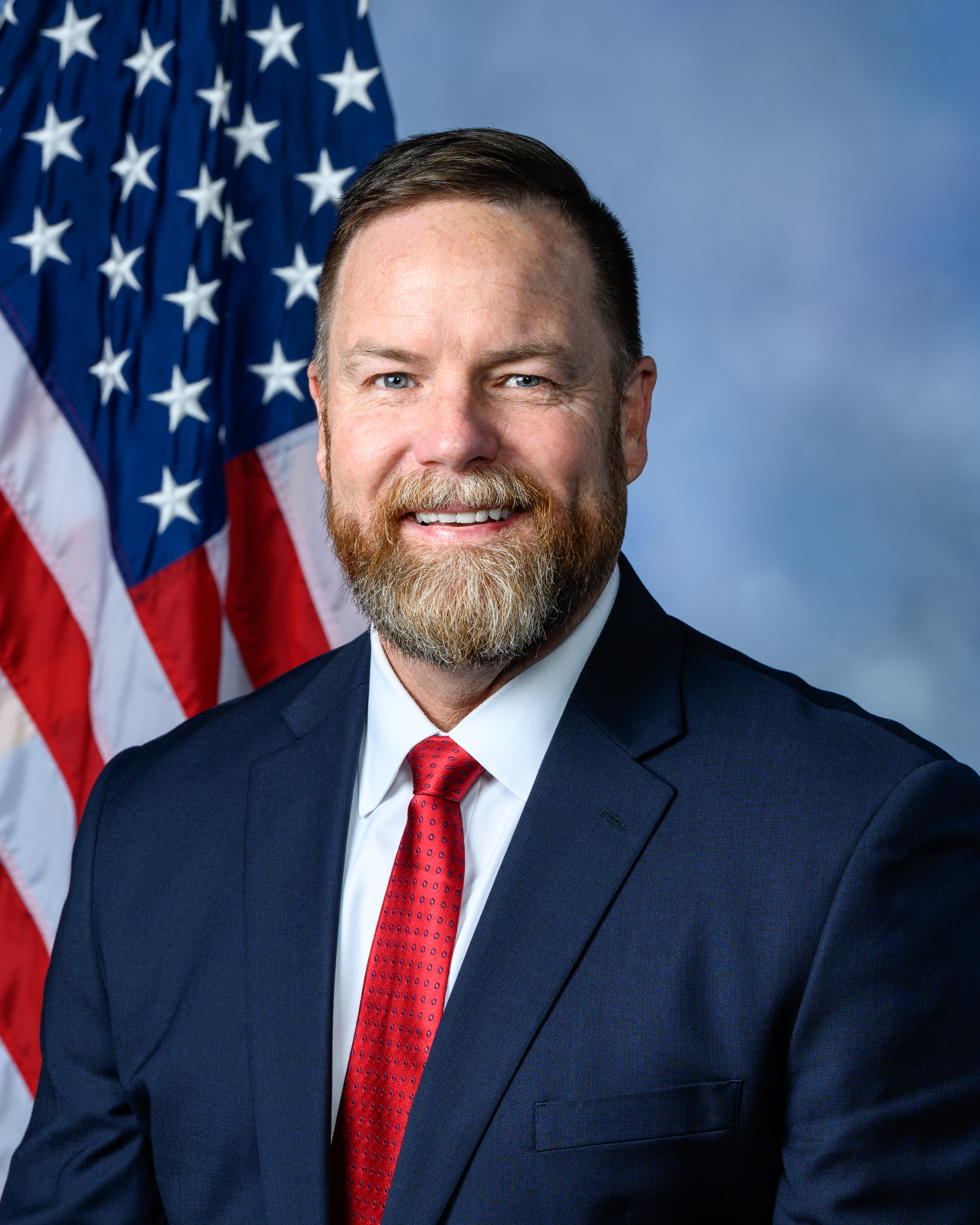
- Official portrait, 2023

Member of the U.S. House of Representatives from Florida's 4th district
- Incumbent
- Assumed office January 3, 2023
- Preceded by: John Rutherford (redistricted)

President pro tempore of the Florida Senate
- In office November 17, 2020 – November 8, 2022
- Preceded by: David Simmons
- Succeeded by: Dennis Baxley

Member of the Florida Senate from the 4th district
- In office November 6, 2012 – November 8, 2022
- Preceded by: Redistricted
- Succeeded by: Clay Yarborough

Member of the Florida House of Representatives from the 12th district
- In office November 7, 2000 – November 4, 2008
- Preceded by: George Crady
- Succeeded by: Janet Adkins

Personal details
- Born: Aaron Paul Bean; January 25, 1967 (age 59) Fernandina Beach, Florida, U.S.
- Party: Republican
- Spouse: Abby Bean
- Children: 3
- Education: Jacksonville University (BS)
- Website: House website Campaign website

Aaron Paul Bean (born January 25, 1967) is an American politician serving as the U.S. representative for Florida's 4th congressional district since 2023. A Republican, Bean represented the 4th district in the Florida Senate, which included all of Nassau County, Clay County and parts of Duval County, from 2012 to 2022. From 2000 to 2008, he represented the 12th district in the Florida House of Representatives.

== Florida Senate ==
In 2012, when Florida Senate districts were reconfigured, the 4th district was drawn to include all of Nassau County, and parts of Duval County, taking in most of Jacksonville's northern suburbs. Bean opted to run in the newly created district, and faced state representative Mike Weinstein in the Republican primary. He was endorsed by former governor of Florida Jeb Bush, Chief Financial Officer Jeff Atwater, Agriculture Commissioner Adam Putnam, the Florida Chamber of Commerce, and the NRA Political Victory Fund. Bean campaigned on increasing the region's political power and clout in state politics, saying, "We're going to...really strengthen our region and fight as we compete with the Tampas and the Miamis." He defeated Weinstein in the primary election with 64% of the vote to Weinstein's 36%, and advanced to the general election, where he faced Democratic nominee Nancy Soderberg, a former high-ranking official at the United States National Security Council and an ambassador during the Clinton administration. During the election, Soderberg attacked Bean for taking campaign contributions from health care companies and for cutting education in the 2008 state budget, while Bean campaigned on increasing school choice for parents, arguing, "We need to give parents the right to choose where they send their kids," and once again on increasing the region's ability to fight for its interests, saying, "We need to hustle through leadership, hustle through skills." Despite the election's contentiousness and Soderberg's high profile, it was not close, with Bean winning his first term in the Florida Senate with 62% of the vote.

While serving in the Senate, Bean proposed legislation during the 2013 legislative session that, in addressing the Medicaid expansion provided for under the Patient Protection and Affordable Care Act, "would reject the $51 billion offered over the next decade for expansion under Obamacare and use state money...to set up a healthcare marketplace under Florida Health Choices, a system he helped set up in 2008 as a member of the House." During the 2014 legislative session, he staked out a position in opposition to legislation that would give the children of undocumented immigrants the ability to pay in-state tuition at state universities, arguing, "I know it feels good giving benefits away. We are giving so many benefits to non-citizens...does it matter even being an American citizen anymore?" He voted for the controversial Senate Bill 86 in 2021.

== U.S. House of Representatives ==
=== Elections ===
==== 2022 ====
Bean announced his candidacy to represent Florida's 4th district in Congress on June 3, 2022. He campaigned on lowering inflation and securing the southern border of the U.S. He defeated two opponents in the Republican primary with 68% of the vote. In the general election, Bean defeated Democratic nominee LaShonda Holloway with 60% of the vote.

=== Tenure ===
==== Housing ====
In June 2026, Bean voted against the 21st Century ROAD to Housing Act, objecting in a letter to its limitation on the ability of certain institutional investors to purchase homes.

==== Israel ====
Bean voted to provide Israel with support following 2023 Hamas attack on Israel.

==== Iran war ====
Bean supported the 2026 Iran war. In June 2026, he voted against a war powers resolution that would have limited the war in Iran.

=== Committee assignments ===
For the 118th Congress:

- Committee on Education and the Workforce
  - Subcommittee on Early Childhood, Elementary, and Secondary Education (Chair)
  - Subcommittee on Health, Employment, Labor, and Pensions
- Committee on Small Business
  - Subcommittee on Contracting and Infrastructure
  - Subcommittee on Oversight, Investigations and Regulations
- Committee on Transportation and Infrastructure
  - Subcommittee on Aviation
  - Subcommittee on Coast Guard and Maritime Transportation
  - Subcommittee on Highways and Transit

=== Caucus memberships ===
- Main Street Caucus

== Personal life ==
Bean is married to Abby Bean (née Bradley) of Green Cove Springs. They have three sons.

Bean is Protestant.

Florida Senate
Preceded by David Simmons	President pro tempore of the Florida Senate; 2020–2023	Succeeded by Dennis Baxley
U.S. House of Representatives
Preceded by John Rutherford	Member of the U.S. House of Representatives from Florida's 4th congressional district 2023–present	Incumbent
U.S. order of precedence (ceremonial)
Preceded by Becca Balint	United States representatives by seniority 293rd	Succeeded by Josh Brecheen
