= George Albright (Florida politician) =

Republican politician

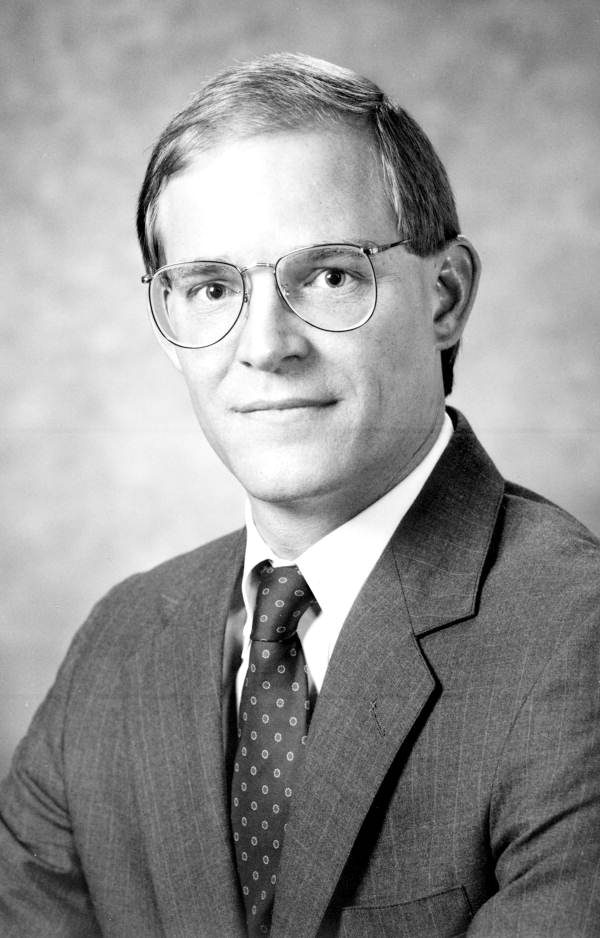

Tax collector of Marion County
- Incumbent
- Assumed office January 2005
- Succeeded by: Bob McCall

Member of the Florida House of Representatives
- In office November 8, 1988 – November 7, 2000
- Preceded by: Chris Meffert
- Succeeded by: Dennis Baxley
- Constituency: 25th district (1988–1992); 24th district (1992–2000)

Personal details
- Born: January 20, 1959 (age 67) Orlando, Florida
- Party: Republican
- Children: Molly Helen
- Education: University of Florida (BA) Cumberland School of Law (JD)
- Profession: Attorney

George Albright is a Republican politician who has served as Marion County Tax Collector since 2005. Previously, Albright served in the Florida House of Representatives from 1986 to 2000, representing the 24th and 25th Districts, and unsuccessfully ran for the Florida Senate in 2000.

== Florida House of Representatives ==
Albright first ran for the State House in 1986, when he challenged incumbent Democratic State Representative Chris Meffert in the 25th District, which was based in Ocala. Despite Republican Bob Martinez's wide victory in the gubernatorial election, Meffert narrowly held on, defeating Albright 54–46%. In 1988, Meffert declined to seek another term, and Albright ran to succeed him. He faced Jo Ann Smith, the Democratic nominee, who was the first female President of the National Cattlemen's Association. Despite Smith's unusual appeal to voters in the district's rural areas, Albright ended up narrowly defeating her, 52–48%. Albright won his second term in 1990 in a landslide over Democratic nominee Dana Harshman, whom he defeated 69–31%.

Following the 1990 Census, Albright's district was slightly reconfigured and renumbered as the 24th District, where he ran for re-election. He won renomination unopposed and was unopposed in the general election. Albright was similarly re-elected unopposed in 1994, 1996, and 1998. He was unable to seek re-election in 2000 because of term limits.

== 2002 Florida Senate campaign ==
In 2002, Albright announced that he would run for the State Senate in a newly drawn state senate district that stretched from Daytona Beach to Ocala and reached into Palatka and the southern Jacksonville suburbs in Clay County. He announced his campaign the same day that a state court ruled that the district was unconstitutional. Albright's law partner, Charles Forman, had filed the lawsuit and suggested an alternative district that was evenly split between Marion County and Volusia County, with a small sliver of Lake County to connect the two. In the Republican primary, he faced State Representative Evelyn Lynn, who had represented a Democratic-leaning House District based in Ormond Beach for eight years, and nursing home administrator Jon Creighton. Lynn was endorsed by the Republican leadership in the State Senate, including Senate President Jim King, who shot down rumors that the party had recruited Albright because it had doubts about Lynn's ability to win. Albright, meanwhile, emphasized his conservative credentials and voting record, which had made him one of the State House's most conservative members during his tenure, in contrast to Lynn's socially moderate voting record, which included her opposition to abortion regulations. Despite Albright's opposition to government spending and social programs, he also based his campaign on his support for the expansion of state-provided health insurance to uninsured children, which he had helped create in the Florida House. The Orlando Sentinel endorsed Lynn over Albright, concluding that while both candidates were experienced and had "realistic ideas," Lynn was "best suited for this district" because of her advocacy for children in the legislature. Albright, the Sentinel concluded, "seems to be mainly interested in winning the seat to benefit Marion County," even though 62% of the district's population was in Volusia County and only 20% was in Marion.

Albright insisted that he would only participate in the Republican primary if the Florida Supreme Court struck down the Senate district, and if it didn't, he would withdraw from the race and endorse Lynn. Shortly before the election, the state Supreme Court reversed the circuit court ruling that struck down the district and Albright withdrew from the race and endorsed Lynn. Nonetheless, Albright remained on the ballot, and received 35% of the vote to Lynn's 52% and Creighton's 13%.

== Marion County Tax Collector ==
In 2004, Albright announced that he would run for Marion County Tax Collector. He faced Marion County Property Appraiser Bob McCall in the Republican primary, and was able to defeat him by a wide margin, winning 55% of the vote to McCall's 45%. He advanced to the general election, where he was opposed by Millie Grissom, the Democratic nominee. Owing to the county's strong Republican lean, Albright ended up defeating Grissom in a landslide, 62–38%.

Albright was re-elected in 2008 against write-in opposition, and was re-elected unopposed in 2012 and 2016.

Florida House of Representatives
Preceded by Chris Meffert	Member of the Florida House of Representatives from the 25th district 1988–1992	Succeeded by Stanley Bainter
Preceded by David Flagg	Member of the Florida House of Representatives from the 24th district 1992–2000	Succeeded by Dennis Baxley
