= Georgia MATCH =

Georgia MATCH is an initiative in the state of Georgia, aimed at simplifying and streamlining the college admissions process for high school seniors. The program was officially launched in 2023 and is intended to make higher education more accessible to Georgia's youth. By simplifying the application process, the program aims to ensure that a wider range of students have access to higher education and the opportunities it offers.

== Background ==
Georgia MATCH was introduced as a response to the evolving landscape of college admissions and the need for increased accessibility for high school students across the state. It was initiated by Georgia Governor Brian Kemp, along with state educations agencies and university systems, and aims to address the challenges that students face during the traditional college application process.

== Direct admissions ==
One of the core features of Georgia MATCH is the provision of direct college admissions to eligible high school seniors. The program is open to all high school seniors in the state of Georgia who meet the program's eligibility criteria based on GPA during their junior year and standardized test scores. This approach is designed to simplify the process for students and ensure they receive timely admissions decisions.

== See also ==
HOPE Scholarship
