= NHRP =

NHRP may refer to:

- National Hispanic Recognition Program, an American program to identify and highlight outstanding Hispanic high school students
- National Hazards Research Platform, a service of the New Zealand Ministry of Business, Innovation and Employment
- National Hurricane Research Project, a former United States scientific hurricane research project
- National Housing Research Program, a program of the Australian Housing and Urban Research Institute
- National Register of Historic Places, a program of the U.S. Government to recognize and document historic objects & places
- Next Hop Resolution Protocol, a protocol used to improve the efficiency of routing computer network traffic
- Nonhuman Rights Project (NhRP), an organization seeking to extend the legal rights of animals
