= Florida Slavery Memorial =

Planned memorial in Florida

The Florida Slavery Memorial commemorates the struggles and suffering of slaves with a memorial at the Florida Capitol in Tallahassee. Support for the planned memorial was approved by Florida's legislators and signed into law by Florida governor Rick Scott in 2018. It was sponsored by representative Kionne McGhee from Miami. Florida is also sending a statue of Mary McLeod Bethune to the U.S. Capitol.

State Senator Dennis Baxley, a descendant of a Confederate soldier, blocked a memorial bill a year earlier but supported the bill that passed in 2018. The Florida House of Representatives passed the bill unanimously. Slaves worked on Florida's 1826 territorial capitol and the 1845 capitol building, as well as many major infrastructure projects in the state. The planned monument would be the first monument at a U.S. state capitol to memorialize slavery.

The monument, ‘Circle of Chains’ by sculptor Steven Whyte of Carmel, California was installed on 28th April 2025
