= Kurt Kelly =

American politician

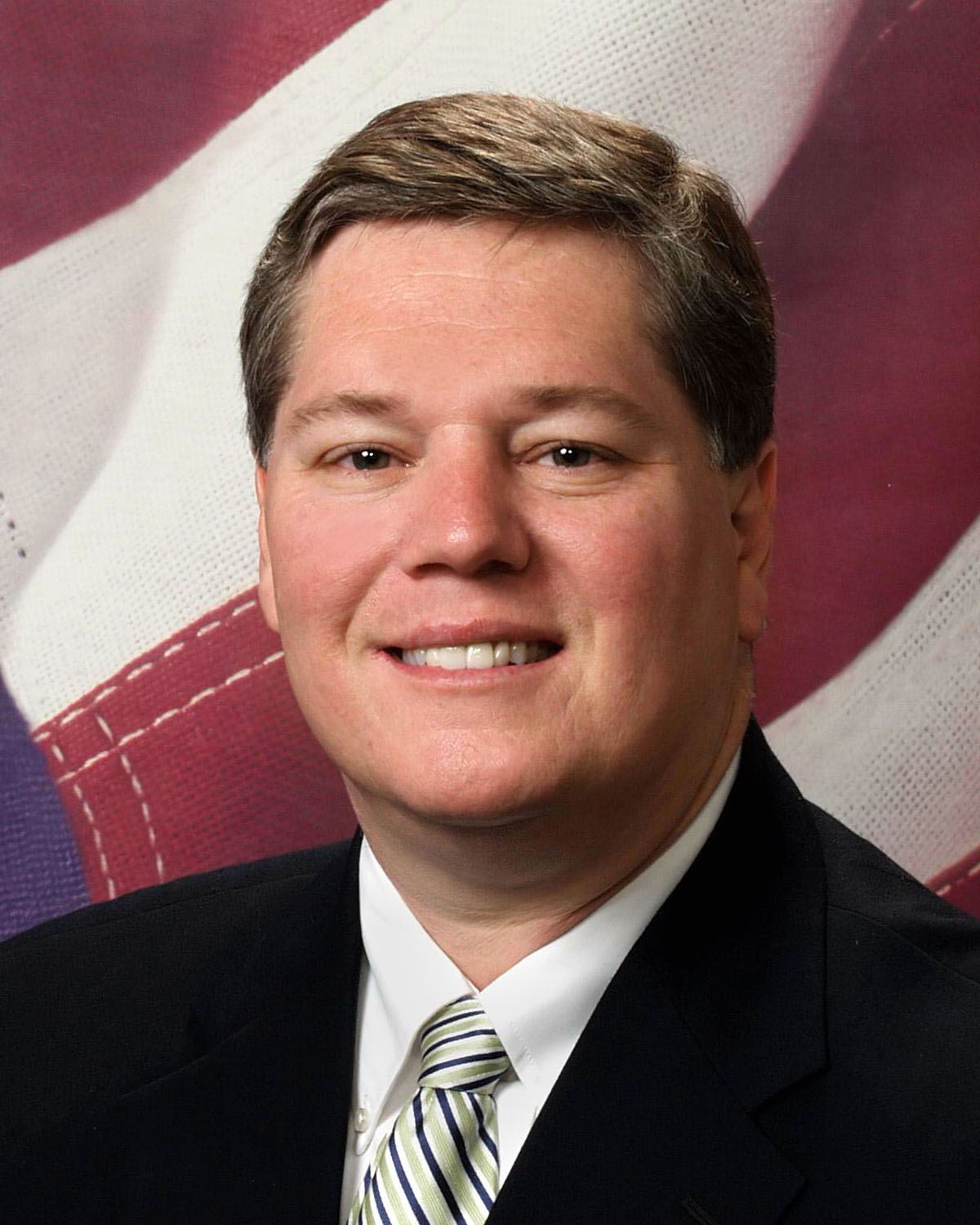

Member of the Florida House of Representatives from the 24th district
- In office June 26, 2007 – November 16, 2010

Personal details
- Born: June 16
- Party: Republican
- Profession: Business Owner

Kurt Kelly (Politician) is an American politician, businessman. He is a native of Ocala, Florida. He was a member of the Florida House of Representatives from the 24th district and is the President/CEO and founder of 3-D Background Screening, a background search company.

== Early life ==
He holds a Master of Science in Education from the University of South Florida and a Bachelor of Science from Florida State University. Kelly is a graduate of Central Florida Community College and Ocala Vanguard High School.

== Career ==
Kelly served 6 years on the Marion County School Board. He was elected to the Florida House of Representatives from District 24 on June 26, 2007, in a special election and has subsequently been re-elected.

Kelly serves on several leadership boards such as Children's Alliance, Success by Six, Ocala Kiwanis, Central Florida Symphony Orchestra, and Child Evangelism Fellowship of Marion County.

During his first Legislative Session, Representative Kelly spearheaded legislation that supported victims of dating violence called the Barwick/Rucshak Act, strengthened early childhood learning, called to the United States Congress to fund Alzheimer research and services, and encouraged the building of "green" schools. Kelly also worked with a state agency to develop statewide plan on drinking water.

During the 2009 Legislative Session, Kelly focused on improving Florida's economy, creating jobs, and protecting and strengthening Florida's public education. He was placed by leadership to be on the House Full Appropriations Council on Education and Economic Development. He is also a member of the Economic Development Policy Committee; Energy and Utilities Policy Committee; State and Community Colleges and Workforce Policy Committee; PreK-12 Appropriations; and State and Community Colleges and Workforce Appropriations. Kelly is the Chair of the Digital Divide Select Counciland the Vision Caucus. He has transformed the Vision Caucus into the largest Caucus in the Florida Legislature.

Kelly was recognized as the 2008 Freshman Legislator of the Year by the Florida Association of Counties, the Florida Water Conservation Champion of 2008, the Central Florida Community Arts-Spirit of International Art Award for 2008, and the 2007-2008 PACE Marion County Champion for Girls award.

== Personal ==
Kelly has been married for 36 years to his wife Sally (retired teacher, Realtor.)
