= Florida House Bill H-837 =

Failed 2005 Florida law

Florida House Bill H-837, also known as HB-837 or The Academic Freedom Bill of Rights, was a proposed bill in 2005 that would have allowed students to establish lawsuits against their professors and university for perceived intolerance of the student's beliefs. The bill could have also required professors to teach concepts that may have contradicted established facts, if the concept was considered a "serious scholarly" theory (such as Holocaust denial).

The bill was heavily criticized as an attack on free speech in academia, and raised concerns about potential abuse by those with fringe beliefs. It died on calendar in May 2005.

== History ==
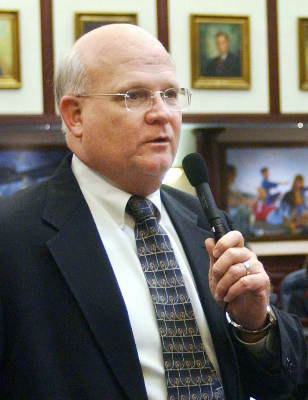
H-837 was proposed by Republican Dennis Baxley (pictured in 2007).

H-837 was one of many "academic freedom" bills proposed throughout the United States in the early 2000s. At the time, the ideological divide between Democrats and Republicans was widening, and many Democrats were highly critical of President George W. Bush and the wars in Afghanistan and Iraq. Neoconservative activist David Horowitz, believing that the amount of liberal college professors was stifling discussion of conservative beliefs, decided to found Students for Academic Freedom (a subgroup of his Center for the Study of Popular Culture). Referencing a 1940 "academic freedom" document published by the American Association of University Professors, he drafted a "Student Bill of Rights" intending to protect students and faculty from discrimination or retaliation based on their political beliefs. Though the Academic Bill of Rights drew sudden backlash in academia, it spurred nationwide efforts to legislate "academic freedom" laws.

In 2004, Florida Representative Dennis Baxley (R-Ocala) began considering an Academic Bill of Rights after listening to Horowitz's speech at a conference. Baxley had attended college in the 1970s, where he felt a professor criticized him for his creationist beliefs. In February 2005, with the support of Horowitz, Baxley proposed H-837, which was closely modeled after Horowitz's Academic Bill of Rights.

== Proposed legislation ==
H-837 would have amended Florida Statute 1002.21 to guarantee "academic freedom" for students, and add Statute 1004.09, which would have laid out what rights students were granted.

Statute 1004.09 would have legally mandated:

1. The right for students to expect "a broad range of scholarly opinion" at their academic institution; institutions should prioritize "the fostering of a plurality of serious scholarly methodologies and perspectives";
2. Prohibition of retaliation by professors against students with different political beliefs via grading, recommendations, or other measures with academic or professional consequences;
3. Prohibition of professors bringing up controversial subjects with "no relation to the subject of study" or "no legitimate pedagogical purpose";
4. Prohibition of "infringement upon" a student's First Amendment rights and "freedom of conscience" by university administrators, student groups, or the academic institute's rules;
5. Use of student fees by academic institutions on a "viewpoint-neutral basis", without lending credence to certain viewpoints;
6. Professors "making [their] students aware of serious scholarly viewpoints other than their own";
7. The right for academic faculty to receive or lose employment or tenure based on their abilities, not their personal beliefs, and;
8. The right for students and all academic faculty to be informed of their academic rights.

If a student felt that their professor had targeted them or behaved in a way that was intolerant of the student's beliefs, H-837 would have given them grounds to file a lawsuit. Some interpreted the bill as mandating professors to teach both sides of a subject without any complaints from students, but Baxley maintained in interviews that this was not part of the bill.

Horowitz's Academic Bill of Rights (and by extension, H-837) did not contain overtly politicized language. However, Democrats raised concerns about the partisan financial support, as well as the conservatism of the board of Students for Academic Freedom.

== Reaction ==
H-837 received national attention; though multiple states proposed similar bills, Florida was the sole state that seemed likely to pass it. The bill primarily gathered support from Republicans and conservative student groups, including Students for Academic Freedom, who denied a political motivation. Proponents asserted that H-837 would give students a more balanced education; conservative students and activists argued that only liberal viewpoints were being taught. Supporters also rallied behind claims that conservative students were being targeted by liberal professors for "humiliation" and retaliation as a result of their beliefs, arguing that the Academic Freedom Bill of Rights would protect students from ideological discrimination. (While both Baxley and Horowitz circulated claims of alleged retaliations, they declined to name students or professors involved.)

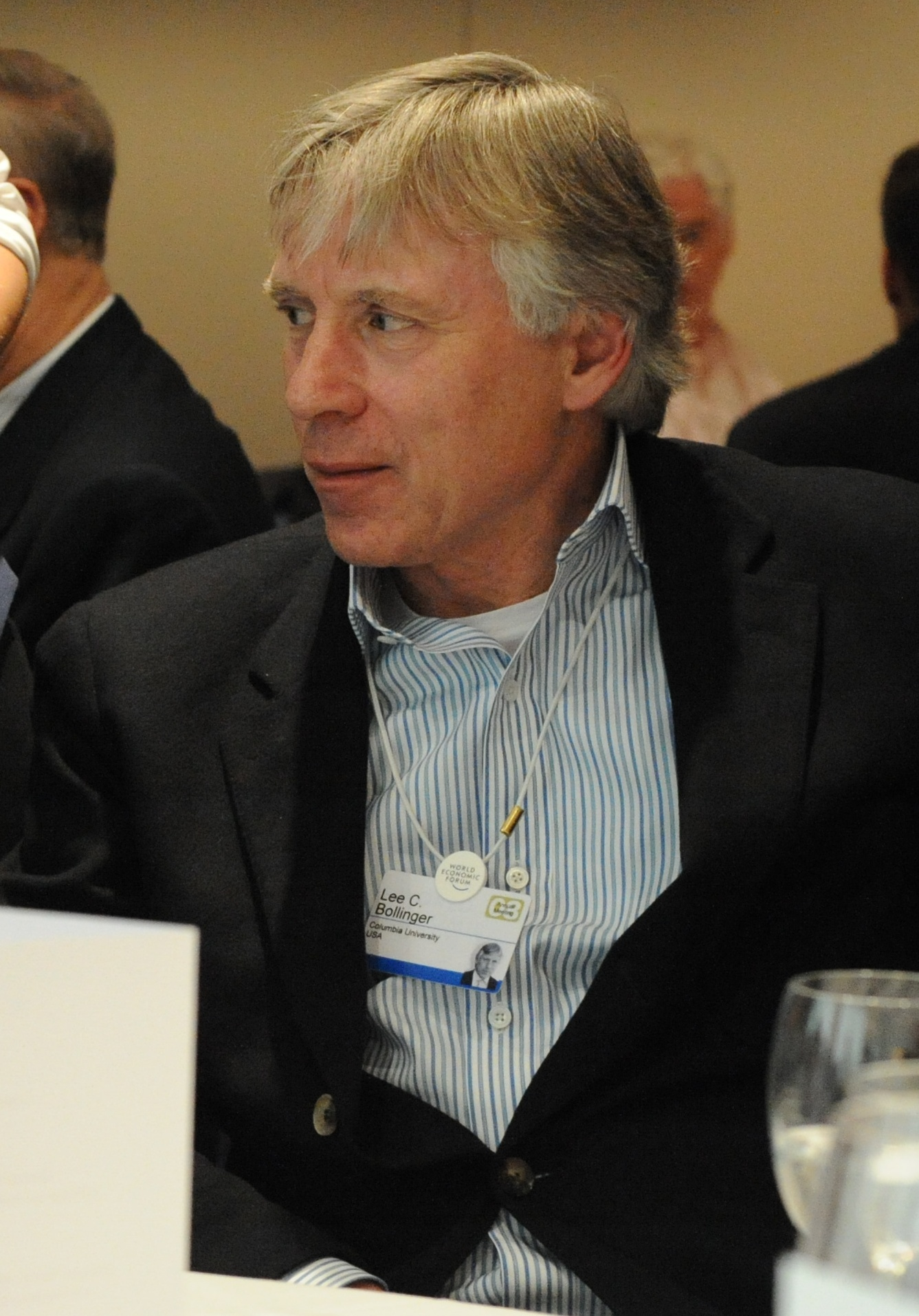
H-837 was discussed by many prominent politicians and academics, including Columbia University president Lee Bollinger (pictured in 2008).

Democrats and academics largely opposed the bill, citing the unclear language and government interference in situations handled by educational boards. Many criticized it as an effort to frighten professors away from controversial topics or discussions, pointing out an overhanging threat of lawsuits would stifle discussions. Eleanor Sobel (D-Hollywood), who voted against the bill in the Choice & Innovation Committee, called it "the antithesis of academic freedom". Dan Gelber (D-Miami Beach) pointed out the potential for abuse by students who believed in conspiracy theories or whose religious beliefs contradicted modern history or science; for instance, medical students whose beliefs did not allow contraception or blood transfusions. Many Florida professors and university administrators spoke out in protest, including Thomas Auxter (the President of the United Faculty in Florida) and Roy Weatherfield (the Florida Education Association's higher education director). Auxter characterized H-837 as "a right-wing political takeover" of higher education, and later testified about the unclear guidelines the bill would set, saying, "The standard will be the most easily offended student and whether or not that person will react against what you are saying". While there was a general consensus that it was inappropriate for professors to push their own views on students or punish them for ideological disagreements, many academic faculty (including Columbia University president Lee Bollinger, in a speech making mention of the bill) stated that discipline for those offenses should be the burden of schools, not courts or legislators.

There was bipartisan uncertainty of the bill's necessity; Florida already has an academic Bill of Rights, and most universities have procedures to file grievances against professors who behaved in an intolerant or vengeful manner. Sobel referenced existing student protections in the form of laws and university policies, and prominent Florida Republicans like Jeb Bush (who typically supported Baxley) and Tom Lee expressed doubt about the use of such a law. In an interview with Democracy Now!, Weatherfield described H-837 as "a solution in search of a problem". In addition, claims of anti-conservative discrimination on campus were often viewed with skepticism; many anecdotes lacked proof, and typically did not name students or professors involved. Nationally, professors who were accused of anti-conservative bias denied the allegations, asserting that details were left out or falsified; faculty members and student witnesses affirmed their statements. Weatherfield shared with Democracy Now! that students infrequently filed grievance reports, a statement corroborated by university presidents Bernie Machen (from University of Florida), T.K. Weatherall (from Florida State University), and Judy Genshaft (from University of South Florida). Auxter, testifying against the bill on April 19, also noted the lack of basis for the bill: "What we've heard [from Horowitz] is anecdotes from other states. We have not heard examples in Florida. [...] [W]e have not heard of any investigations of the contentions he has made about people in other states."

Both Baxley and Horowitz portrayed opposition to the bill as the work of a controlling liberal agenda. Baxley described liberal professors as "leftist totalitarians," "dictators," and "arrogant elitists", and dubbed critics of the bill "inflexible". Horowitz attributed disagreement to "lies" and a "malicious campaign" opposing him, describing it as "vitriolic and dishonest".

== Death of bill and subsequent legacy ==
H-837 received enough votes to progress to the Florida House of Representatives, but died on calendar in May 2005. The St. Petersburg Times reported that Baxley intended to continue pursuing passage of the bill, and wanted to propose the bill again in 2006. Horowitz, however, claimed that H-837 was "still being considered" despite the ending of the legislative session. Baxley did not re-propose an Academic Bill of Rights in the 2006 legislative session.

Nationally, Horowitz's proposed Academic Bill of Rights became increasingly unpopular. It was criticized by major academic and anti-censorship groups, including the American Association of University Professors, American Historical Association, and the National Coalition Against Censorship. Horowitz himself also received criticism for sharing unverified stories of ideological discrimination from professors; at least one claim was heavily fabricated, and he later admitted to lacking evidence of two others. No states had ratified his Academic Bill of Rights by 2005, and Horowitz chose to pursue other forms of campus activism by 2006.

Despite the failure of H-837, Florida continued pursuing academic freedom legislation. In April 2021, Baxley, now a member of the Florida Senate, voted in favor of HB-233, an "intellectual freedom" law that allowed students to film perceived bias from their professors, and barred university faculty from censoring "uncomfortable" or "offensive" speech on campus. The bill passed in the Florida Legislature.
