= Bright Futures Scholarship Program =

Florida scholarship program

Florida Bright Futures Scholarship Program
- Formation: 1997; 29 years ago
- Type: Merit-based scholarship
- Parent organization: Florida Department of Education
- Budget: $226 million (2016)
- Website: Official website

Bright Futures is a scholarship program in the state of Florida. It is funded by the Florida Lottery and was created in 1997.

== History ==
The Bright Futures Scholarship Program was meant to emulate neighboring state Georgia's HOPE Scholarship. Originally the Program disbursed just above 42,000 scholarships for about $70 million. At the program's peak in 2008, it provided scholarships to 39% of Florida high school graduates, including 94 percent of incoming freshmen and 70 percent of all undergraduates at the University of Florida.

The program was solely based on academic merit and not on financial need, and had an "A level" and a "B level", plus a vocational scholarship program that could be used at trade schools. The A level covered 100% of tuition and fees while the B level covered 75%. At its height in 2008, the program was criticized for subsidizing the education of students from wealthy families using lottery proceeds collected largely from lower-income individuals. UF Chief Financial Officer Matt Fajack criticized the program for keeping state university tuition artificially low, since any tuition raise would mean that the state would have to spend more money to cover scholarships under the program.

The Florida Legislature enacted cuts to Bright Futures funding in 2011 by increasing the minimum SAT score required to qualify for the program. The changes took full effect for the graduating class of 2014, increasing the minimum score for the "A level", from 1280 to 1290, and increasing the minimum score for the "B level" from 980 to 1170; as well as decreasing the award amount for the "A level" to only cover 50% of tuition and fees and the "B level" to cover 33%, down from 100% and 75% respectively. The cuts disproportionately impacted black and Latino students as well as students from predominantly poor schools. By the 2015–16 school year, the program covered only 20% of Florida high school graduates and paid an average of $2,000 per year.

In 2014, the United States Department of Education launched an investigation of the Bright Futures program due to allegations of racial bias against black and Latino students, focusing particularly on its effects on students from Miami–Dade County and at Florida International University. The department ultimately found evidence of disparate impacts on minorities but no evidence of discriminatory intent.

2018 saw a massive overhaul of the scholarship, with the "A level" being renamed to "Florida Academic Scholar" (FAS), the "B level" renamed to "Florida Medallion Scholar" (FMS), the vocational program being renamed to "Gold Seal Vocational", and a new fourth level (also intended for vocational schools) called "Gold Seal CAPE". Another new award was also added called the Academic Top Scholar (ATS) award, which would be given to the student with the highest academic rank in each Florida county. The FAS and FMS levels returned to their previous values, with the FAS increasing to cover 100% of tuition and fees plus a new $300 per semester book stipend and the FMS increasing to cover 75% of tuition and fees.

In 2021, the book stipend was removed as part of the budgetary process. This change came among many controversies surrounding Florida Senate Bill 86, a piece of legislation that would have made massive structural changes to Bright Future's implementation and administration. While SB 86 did not pass the Florida House of Representatives, other similar legislation raised the SAT score requirements from 1290 to 1330 for FAS and 1170 to 1210 for FMS (later reduced to 1190), but the ACT score requirement remained the same for both levels. The scholarship began accepting scores from the Classic Learning Test (CLT) as an alternative to the SAT and ACT in 2025, and requires a score of 95 for FAS and 82 for FMS.

== Scholarships ==
=== Basic requirements ===
As of August 2022, the program funds four scholarship levels, available to students who:

- Are U.S. citizens or legal residents;
- Graduate from a Florida high school, OR earn a GED as a Florida resident, OR homeschooled students who are registered with their local district for at least two school years, OR out-of-state students who earn a diploma from a non-Florida high school while living with a parent or legal guardian who is a Florida resident on military/public service assignment outside of Florida for the student's last year of high school;
- Have not been found guilty of, or plead no contest to, a felony charge, unless granted clemency;
- Submit a Florida Financial Aid Application (FFAA);
- Be accepted to and enroll in a degree/certificate program at an eligible Florida post-secondary institution;
- Meet the requirements of the specified scholarship (listed below).

All above requirements must be met by August 31 of a student's high school graduation year.

=== Scholarship-specific requirements ===
This section does not list every possible scenario that can be used to qualify for a Bright Futures scholarship, but it does list the most common ways. For the full list of ways to qualify as of August 2025, see here.

- Florida Academic Scholars (FAS):
  - Minimum weighted (Note: Weighting system adds an extra 0.25 to GPA per semester taken of Honors, Advanced Placement (AP), Pre-International Baccalaureate (Pre-IB), International Baccalaureate (IB), Pre-Advanced International Certificate of Education (Pre-AICE), Advanced International Certificate of Education (AICE), and Dual Enrollment courses) GPA of 3.50 in the 16 "college preparatory" required courses (Note: 4 years of English (3 of which must include substantial writing) 4 years of Mathematics (all at or above Algebra I) 3 years of Natural Sciences (2 of which must include substantial laboratory work) 3 years of Social Sciences 2 years of World Languages (must be sequential classes in the same language)), OR be a National Merit Finalist or Scholar, OR National Hispanic Scholar, OR receive an Advanced International Certificate of Education (AICE) diploma prior to high school graduation, OR receive an International Baccalaureate (IB) diploma prior to high school graduation;
  - Completion of the 16 "college preparatory" required courses;
  - Minimum ACT composite score of 29 OR minimum SAT combined reading/math score of 1330 OR a minimum CLT score of 95. Score must be sent to at least one of Florida's 12 state universities;
  - Completion (with signed documentation) of a combined 100 volunteer service hours AND/OR paid work hours. Volunteer hours or paid work must fall under the list of "approved activities" set by the student's district school board (or school administration if the student attends a nonpublic school).
  - IF the student earned a GED instead of a high school diploma OR is applying as an out-of-state student, they must also submit high school transcripts to the Florida Office of Student Financial Aid.
- Florida Medallion Scholars (FMS):
  - Minimum weighted GPA of 3.00 in the 16 "college preparatory" required courses, OR be a National Merit Finalist or Scholar, OR National Hispanic Scholar, OR receive an Advanced International Certificate of Education (AICE) diploma prior to high school graduation, OR receive an International Baccalaureate (IB) diploma prior to high school graduation;
  - Completion of the 16 "college preparatory" required courses;
  - Minimum ACT composite score of 24 OR minimum SAT combined reading/math score of 1190 OR minimum CLT score of 82. Score must be sent to at least one of Florida's 12 state universities;
  - Completion (with signed documentation) of 75 volunteer service hours OR 100 paid work hours OR a combination of 100 total hours. Volunteer hours or paid work must fall under the "approved activities" set by the student's district school board (or school administration if the student attends a nonpublic school).
  - IF the student earned a GED instead of a high school diploma OR is applying as an out-of-state student, they must also submit high school transcripts to the Florida Office of Student Financial Aid.
- Florida Gold Seal Vocational Scholars (GSV):
  - Minimum weighted GPA of 3.00 in non-elective courses;
  - Minimum unweighted GPA of 3.50 in career education courses (must take at least 3 career education courses);
  - Minimum ACT Reading, English, and Math scores of 19, 17, and 19 respectively, OR minimum SAT Reading, Writing, and Math scores of 24, 25, and 24, respectively (for tests taken prior to March 1, 2024), OR minimum SAT Reading and Writing score of 490 and Math score of 480 (for tests taken on March 1, 2024 or later), OR Florida Postsecondary Education Readiness Test (P.E.R.T.) Reading, Writing, and Math scores of 106, 103, and 114, respectively. Score must be sent to at least one of Florida's 12 state universities;
  - Completion (with signed documentation) of 30 volunteer service hours (increasing to 75 hours for students entering high school in 2024) OR 100 paid work hours OR a combination of 100 total hours. Volunteer hours or paid work must fall under the "approved activities" set by the student's district school board (or school administration if the student attends a nonpublic school).
  - IF the student earned a GED instead of a high school diploma OR is applying as an out-of-state student, they must also submit high school transcripts to the Florida Office of Student Financial Aid.
  - May only be used at postsecondary institutions that offer an applied technology diploma, technical degree education program or a career certificate program.
- Florida Gold Seal CAPE Scholars (GSC):
  - Earn a minimum of five post-secondary credit hours through Career and Professional Education (CAPE) industry certifications that count for college credit;
  - Completion (with signed documentation) of 30 volunteer service hours (increasing to 75 hours for students entering high school in 2024) OR 100 paid work hours OR a combination of 100 total hours. Volunteer hours or paid work must fall under the "approved activities" set by the student's district school board (or school administration if the student attends a nonpublic school).
  - May only be used at institutions that offer an applied technology diploma, technical degree education program (associate in applied science or associate in science), or a career certificate program. Upon completion of an eligible associate degree program, a GSC Scholar may also apply to receive an additional award for a maximum of 60 credit hours toward an eligible baccalaureate degree.

Additionally, the Bright Futures program gives an Academic Top Scholar (ATS) award to the student with the highest academic rank in each of Florida's 67 counties, based on multiplying the student's weighted GPA and ACT/SAT score.

Requirements for all levels must be met no later than January 31 of a mid-year graduating senior's graduation year (i.e. students who graduate after one semester of their senior year) or June 30 of a regular graduating senior's graduation year. Each district school board (or school administration for nonpublic schools) has the right to set an earlier deadline for volunteer/paid work hour completion requirements if they choose to do so.

==== Renewal requirements ====
At each level, the scholarship is valid for one year and is renewable for up to five years or a specified number of semester hours depending on scholarship level (Note: ATS, FAS, and FMS: 120 hours GSV: 72 hours for a Technical Degree Education Program or Career Certificate Program OR 60 credit hours for an Applied Technology Degree Program GSC: 60 hours, can apply for an additional 60 hours toward an eligible bachelor's degree program after completion of associate degree) (whichever comes sooner), but certain requirements must be met regarding GPA and courses completed, depending on the level.

- All levels:
  - Be enrolled for at least six non-remedial semester credit hours (or equivalent) per term, unless the student needs fewer than six semester hours to complete their degree program;
  - Complete a minimum 24 semester hours (or equivalent) per academic year.
- FAS and ATS:
  - 3.00 GPA, must earn credits in all classes taken, unless withdrawn from (i.e. the student must pass all courses taken, except for courses from which the student withdraws). Must refund the Scholarship Program for any withdrawn classes, if applicable.
- FMS, GSV, and GSC:
  - 2.75 GPA, must earn credits in all classes taken, unless withdrawn from. Must refund the Scholarship Program for any withdrawn classes, if applicable.

If a FAS awardee drops below the 3.00 GPA requirement, they are allowed to renew at the FMS level (provided their GPA is still above 2.75). If the student dropped below the threshold during their first year of study they may also be reinstated at the FAS level if they bring their GPA back above 3.00; FMS awardees can also be reinstated if they drop below the 2.75 requirement and then bring their GPA back up during their first year of study, but they cannot earn FAS even if their GPA meets the FAS requirement of 3.00.

If a student withdraws from a course, they must repay Bright Futures for the cost of that course.

If a student is unable to meet annual renewal requirements due to a verifiable illness or other documented emergency (as reported by the post-secondary institution), an exception of one academic year to the renewal timeframe may be granted on a case-by-case basis.

=== Award amounts ===
(All numbers as of 2022–23 school year)

- FAS: 100% of tuition and fees at all public institutions (Florida College System or State University System of Florida) or comparable dollar amount at private institutions.
- FMS: 100% of tuition and fees if enrolled in an associate degree program at a Florida College System member; otherwise 75% of tuition and fees at public institutions or comparable dollar amount at private institutions.
- GSV: For institutions with semester systems: $39/credit hour for Career Certificate Program (CCP) or Applied Technology Diploma Program (ATDP), $48/credit hour for Technical Degree Education Program (TDEP, meaning associate degree program) or Bachelors of Science (BS)/Bachelors of Applied Science (BAS) program. For institutions with quarter systems: $26/credit hour for CCP or ATDP, $32/credit hour for TDEP or BS/BAS program. Cannot be used for summer courses.
- GSC: For institutions with semester systems: $39/credit hour for CCP or ATDP, $49/credit hour for TDEP or BS/BAS program. For institutions with quarter systems: $26/credit hour for CCP or ATDP, $32/credit hour for TDEP or BS/BAS program. Cannot be used for summer courses.
- ATS: For institutions with semester systems: extra $44/credit hour on top of FAS scholarship. For institutions with quarter systems: extra $29/credit hour on top of FAS scholarship.

=== Additional information ===
- Students may defer their scholarship by up to 5 years after graduating high school. If a student enlists in the military directly after high school, they can defer their scholarship for their entire time enlisted plus an additional 5 years.
- If a FAS or FMS student completes their Bachelor's Degree in 7 semesters or fewer, they may receive funding for up to one semester of study in a Graduate School program (not exceeding 15 semester credit hours or equivalent).

== See also ==
- State University System of Florida
- Florida Board of Governors
