= Academic Bill of Rights =

The Academic Bill of Rights (ABOR) is a document created and distributed by a branch of the David Horowitz Freedom Center, a think tank founded by the conservative writer David Horowitz. A wide range of critics, representing a diverse range of academic viewpoints, have criticized it for infringing on academic freedom and described it as promoting an ideological agenda. Opponents include the American Association of University Professors, the American Library Association, and the American Federation of Teachers.

== Criticism ==
A number of organizations representing a variety of political viewpoints have criticized the ABOR's aims and content.

One of the first organizations to come out in opposition to the bill was the American Association of University Professors (AAUP). While agreeing with the underlying principles of freedom, equality, and pluralism in the university community, the association said that the bill "infringes academic freedom in the very act of purporting to protect it."

Some individual academics regard the ABOR, along with the Santorum Amendment, as a threat to academic freedom. Others have suggested that the ABOR may allow students to claim discrimination when tested on evolution.

Moderate, libertarian, and conservative critics of the ABOR have asserted that it would open the door to a right wing version of the campus speech code. An article by David T. Beito, Ralph E. Luker and KC Johnson in the Perspectives magazine of the American Historical Association warned that the ABOR "could snuff out all controversial discussion in the classroom. A campus governed by the ABOR would present professors with an impossible dilemma: either play it safe or risk administrative censure by saying something that might offend an overly sensitive student."

The American Library Association also opposed the ABOR, with members approving a resolution stating that the Bill "would impose extra-academic standards on academic institutions, directly interfering in course content, the classroom, the research process, and hiring and tenure decisions."

A number of other groups have also opposed the ABOR, including the American Federation of Teachers, the National Coalition Against Censorship (NCAC), and others. Some left-leaning groups, including Refuse and Resist, and the AFL–CIO, expressed concern and criticism of the Bill, particularly warning against the regulatory oversight that the bill would place upon academic institutions, if passed.

== See also ==
- Academic freedom
- Academic Freedom bills
- Academic administration
- Bill of rights
- Florida House Bill H-837
