= Barbara Forrest =

American academic

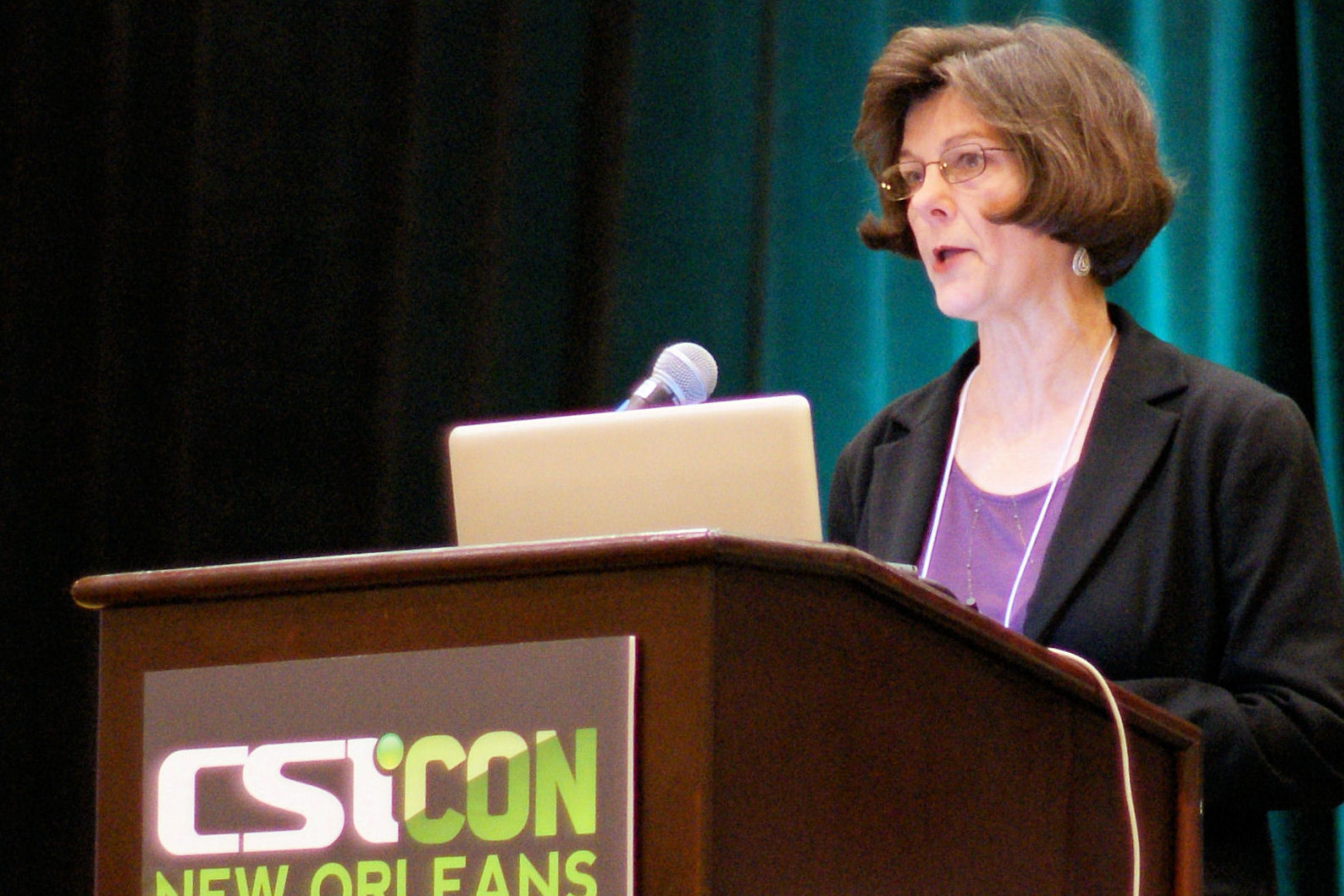
- Barbara Forrest participating in the "Creation and Evolution" panel at CSICon 2011 in New Orleans
- Known for: Creationism's Trojan Horse
- Awards: ASCB Public Service Award (2006); Humanist Pioneer Award (2009)

Education
- Education: Southeastern Louisiana University (BA); Louisiana State University (MA); Tulane University (PhD)

Barbara Carroll Forrest is a professor of philosophy at Southeastern Louisiana University in Hammond, Louisiana. She is a critic of intelligent design and the Discovery Institute.

== Biography ==
Forrest is a graduate of Hammond High School. She received her B.A. in English in 1974 from Southeastern Louisiana University, her M.A. in philosophy in 1978 from Louisiana State University, and her Ph.D. in philosophy from Tulane University in 1988. She has taught philosophy at Southeastern Louisiana University from 1988 until 2017 as a professor of philosophy in the Department of History and Political Science.

== Work ==
She co-authored Creationism's Trojan Horse: The Wedge of Intelligent Design (Oxford University Press, 2004), with biologist Paul R. Gross. The book examines the goals and strategies of the intelligent design movement and its attempts to undermine established science. The authors analyze the absence of a scientific intelligent design hypothesis, identify religious foundations, and the political ambitions of intelligent design proponents. They examine the movement's Wedge strategy which has advanced and is succeeding through public relations rather than through scientific research. They also highlight intelligent design creationism's relationship to public education and to the separation of church and state.

Forrest serves on the board of directors of the National Center for Science Education (NCSE), the Board of Trustees of Americans United for Separation of Church and State, and the New Orleans Secular Humanist Association (NOSHA).

=== Kitzmiller v. Dover Area School District ===
Forrest was a key expert witness for the plaintiffs in the 2005 Kitzmiller v. Dover Area School District trial. The defendants were represented by the Thomas More Law Center (TMLC), a conservative Christian, not-for-profit law center whose motto is "The Sword and the Shield for People of Faith". After Forrest had been deposed, the TMLC tried but failed to have her stopped from testifying. In a motion to have her removed as a witness, they described her as "little more than a conspiracy theorist and a web-surfing, 'cyber-stalker' of the Discovery Institute ... ." Judge Jones denied the motion and Forrest's testimony began on October 5.

According to Forrest, after the TMLC's attempt to exclude her as a witness had failed, and only a few days before she would be testifying, the Discovery Institute attempted to publicly ridicule her on their website. She wrote:

On September 29, I noticed that DI had posted a transcript of an interview I had done—except that I hadn't done it. The transcript was fake. Apparently meant (though not marked) as a parody, the organization whose self-described goal is "to support high-quality scholarship [...] relevant to the question of evidence for intelligent design in nature" ridiculed me by, among other things, having a fictitious radio host "Marvin Waldburger" refer to me as "Dr. Barking Forrest Ph.D." If DI thought this would unsettle me, they were ignoring the fact that I had just been through two killer hurricanes. I could only shake my head at their doing something so jaw-droppingly stupid. If they were hoping Judge Jones would see and be influenced by this silliness, it was just another sign of the disrespect for his intelligence and integrity that began before the trial and continues today.

During her testimony, the defense lawyers again asked the court to exclude Forrest from testifying as an expert witness. Judge Jones allowed them to present their case for dismissing her and then denied their request. Forrest would go on to testify on the religious origins and nature of the intelligent design movement, the wedge document, and also demonstrated that the drafts of the textbook at the center of the court case, Of Pandas and People, substituted terms such as "intelligent design" and "intelligent designer" in place of "creationism" and "creator" in an attempt to circumvent the ruling in Edwards v. Aguillard which determined that teaching creationism in public schools violated the Establishment Clause of the United States constitution. Her testimony had a significant impact on Judge Jones's decision.

A year after the ruling, Forrest commented in a telephone interview "It was very clear to everyone who followed the case that intelligent design is not science. The Discovery Institute has been trying for years to foment a court case. And they finally got one dropped in their laps and what was ironic is they didn't want it. They knew what this case would do to them."

=== Synthese essay ===
An essay by Forrest, "The non-epistemology of intelligent design: its implications for public policy", was published online in March 2009 as part of a special issue of the journal Synthese. The issue was titled "Evolution and Its Rivals" and was guest edited by Glenn Branch and James H. Fetzer, the latter a former editor of Synthese. Forrest's essay strongly criticized philosopher Francis J. Beckwith, noting that he had "no formal credentials as a constitutional scholar" to justify his stances on issues regarding the separation of church and state and connected Beckwith and other advocates of intelligent design to Christian Reconstructionism. Following complaints from Beckwith and others mentioned in the issue, the regular editors of Synthese, Johan van Benthem, Vincent F. Hendricks, and John F. Symons, included an editorial statement in the print version of the special issue, published in January 2011, which criticized the tone of some of the papers in that issue. The note was perceived as directed at Forrest's essay and drew angry denunciations from the guest editors, who were not consulted about the statement, and other critics. At least one philosopher has withdrawn a paper from Synthese as a result.

=== Louisiana Science Education Act ===
Forrest worked with Zack Kopplin and helped begin the campaign to repeal the Louisiana Science Education Act law that allowed the promotion of creationism in biology science classes. The repeal effort, SB70 of 2011, failed in the Senate Education Committee by a 5–1 vote. The repeal effort, SB374 of 2012, also failed in the Senate Education Committee by a 2–1 effort.

== Public speaking ==
Forrest has appeared in the media, including PBS. She was the featured speaker for Southeastern Louisiana University's Linus A. Sims Memorial Library commemoration of the 150th anniversary of the publication of Darwin's Origin of Species on April 23, 2009.

== Bibliography ==
- Creationism's Trojan Horse: The Wedge of Intelligent Design. New York: Oxford University Press. 2004. ISBN 978-0-19-515742-0. book website, as retrieved by the Wayback Machine on January 4, 2015.
