= Florida Sunshine Law =

Law requiring government meetings be open to the public

Florida's Government in the Sunshine Law, also called the Sunshine Law, provides a right of access to governmental proceedings of public boards or commissions at both the state and local levels. It requires meetings of public boards or commissions must be open to the public, reasonable notice of such meetings must be given, and minutes of the meetings must be taken and promptly recorded.

== History ==
The Government in the Sunshine Law was passed in 1967. The law is codified within Chapter 286 of the Florida Statutes.

The Sunshine Review Act of 1995 applies to meetings. According to that Act, also called the Open Government Sunset Review Act, an exemption must fit within one of three categories of identifiable public purposes, and must be seen as compelling enough to override a strong presumption of openness.
