= Florida Senate Bill 86 (2021) =

Florida State Legislature
- Full name: CS/CS/SB 86: Student Financial Aid
- Introduced: February 23, 2021
- Senate voted: 22 Yeas – 18 Nays
- Sponsor: Dennis Baxley
- Governor: Ron DeSantis
- Website: https://www.flsenate.gov/Session/Bill/2021/86

Status: Not passed (Died In Messages in Florida House)

Senate Bill 86, also titled SB 86: Student Financial Aid or An act relating to student financial aid was a proposed 2021 Florida educational funding bill that would have made major changes to the implementation and administration of the Bright Futures Scholarship Program. The bill drew considerable controversy due to its proposals.

== History ==
Senate Bill 86 was originally proposed by Senator Dennis Baxley of Lady Lake in February 2021, during the 2021 Legislative Session of the Florida Legislature. The bill intended to impose certain limitations on the amount of Bright Futures funding students could receive based on their major. The Board of Governors and State Board of Education were to draft a list of majors and programs of study which lead to employment. This list would have been used in determine who would receive full funding and who would receive half funding.

The bill was first heard by the Florida Senate Committee on Education on March 16, 2021. It was originally scheduled to be heard on March 9, 2021, but could not be fit into the schedule. After debate between GOP and Democratic senators, the committee passed an amendment by Dennis Baxley along party lines, 5-4. The newly amended version would put a hold on registration freshman year, until students completed certain training modules. Most other language was kept.

In mid-March, when asked about Bright Futures, Governor Ron DeSantis signaled his support for full funding. The bill passed through two other committees, the Appropriation Subcommittee on Education and Committee on Appropriations. In this process, the bill was further amended. The version that advanced to the floor would put Bright Futures into general appropriations. The bill passed in the Senate with two GOP senators, Keith Perry and Jennifer Bradley, voting against it.

The bill died in messages, not being considered in the House of Representatives.

== Controversy ==
The bill faced considerable backlash throughout its many forms. Several student accounts appeared on Instagram to try and organize against SB 86. A website was even created by some students, titled Save Bright Futures. Several parent groups also emerged on Facebook to organize and share resources. A Change.org petition was created, which received 138,557 signatures. Several other smaller ones emerged.

At the first committee hearing, nearly 70 students, parents, and teacher spoke. Among those that spoke were several student body presidents from the Florida Student Association, teachers from across Florida and concerned parents. While there was progress with the amendment.

Concerned people also spoke at the next committees, the Appropriations Subcommittee on Education and Committee on Appropriations. In early April, the Florida Student Association cosigned a letter condemning the intentions of the bill.

Across the process, small protests and awareness campaigns emerged across Florida and at universities in the state. In Gainesville, UF students created a mural to protest SB 86 on 34th Street whilst some parents protested. Others in Tampa held protests, especially students of USF.

== See also ==
- Education in the United States
- Student financial aid (United States)
