= Ocala Symphony Orchestra =

The Ocala Symphony Orchestra, formerly known as the Central Florida Symphony Orchestra and Ocala Festival Orchestra, is a professional per-service orchestra in Ocala, Florida, U.S.

The orchestra had its beginning in Ocala, Florida, in 1975, when a group of dedicated musicians and public-spirited citizens set about to organize a symphonic orchestra for the area. A four-concert season was initiated that has expanded today into over two dozen performances throughout the year. The symphony was incorporated on February 17, 1976, and was granted 501 (c) 3 status in August 1977. After a variety of performance venues including a period at the Central Florida Community College, and the Ocala Breeder's Sales Pavilion, the orchestra led a $3.5 million fundraising campaign to renovate the Ocala City Auditorium into the Reilly Arts Center. The orchestra continues to manage the venue and in 2020 embarked on a $4.5 million expansion project that will be complete in November 2021.

The Ocala Symphony Orchestra is under the direction of Maestro Matthew Wardell. Wardell is in his 15th year as a music director and conductor of the OSO and has nearly a decade of experience as an interim director of orchestral studies, visiting lecturer, associate / assistant conductor, adjunct faculty member, and visiting artist at universities and colleges.
