= HOPE Scholarship =

Scholarship program in Georgia, US

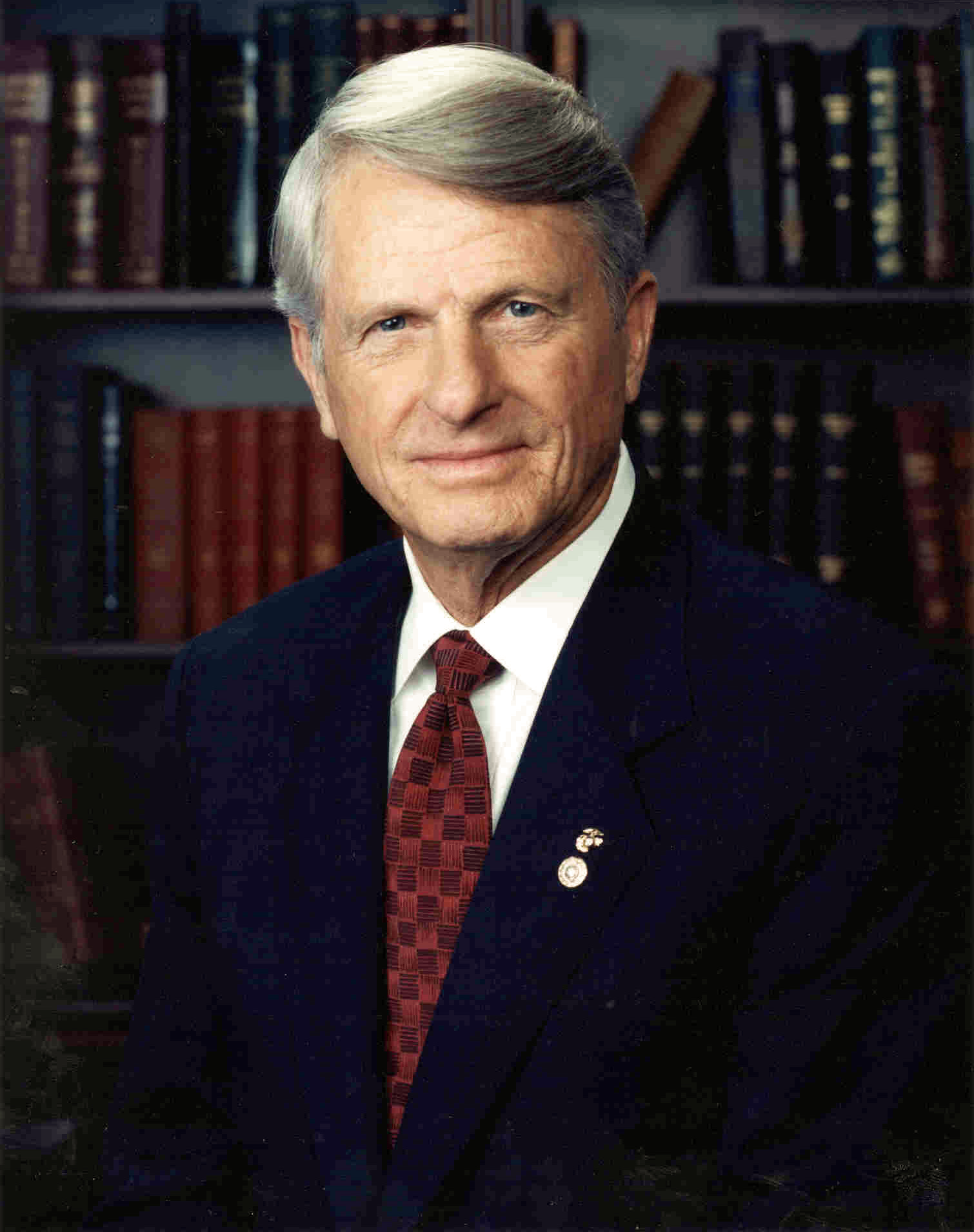
Georgia Governor Zell Miller was responsible for the creation for the HOPE Scholarship.

The Helping Outstanding Pupils Educationally (HOPE) Program is a scholarship and grant initiative established in the U.S. state of Georgia in 1993. Under the guidance of then-Governor Zell Miller, the program was designed to provide financial aid to exceptional students pursuing degree, diploma, or certificate programs. HOPE is applicable at eligible public and private colleges and universities throughout Georgia, as well as public technical colleges. HOPE is funded entirely by revenue from the Georgia Lottery and is administered by the Georgia Student Finance Commission (GSFC).

As of 2024, HOPE encompasses six distinct scholarships and grants, each with its own unique eligibility criteria and requirements. These include the HOPE Career Grant, the HOPE Grant, the HOPE High School Equivalency Examination Grant Program, the HOPE Scholarship, the Zell Miller Grant, and the Zell Miller Scholarship.

The HOPE Scholarship Program has awarded over $14 billion to more than 2.1 million Georgia students since its inception in 1993. The Hope Scholarship regulations and requirements are codified in Georgia law and has undergone a number of changes by the Georgia Legislature.

== History ==
January 14, 1991: Zell Miller is inaugurated as Georgia's 79th governor. He introduces legislation before the General Assembly to establish a lottery. A statewide referendum must be passed to amend the Georgia Constitution to allow a lottery.

January 31, 1991: Resolution to put lottery amendment before voters passes the Georgia House 126-51 and is adopted by a 47–9 vote of the Georgia Senate.

November 3, 1992: Georgia voters pass the lottery amendment 1,146,340-1,050,674.

November 1992-August 1993: Governor Miller establishes three distinct and individually funded lottery programs: the HOPE Scholarship Program, a voluntary pre-kindergarten program for four-year-olds, and an instructional technology program.

June 29, 1993: The first Georgia Lottery ticket is sold, sparking a windfall of unprecedented lottery sales. Georgia's first year of sales brought in a national record of $1.13 billion, providing $360 million for the three education programs.

September 1, 1993: Georgia's first HOPE Scholarship is awarded to Matthew Miller of Snellville, Georgia to attend Gwinnett Technical College.

July 1, 1994: HOPE makes its first expansion to cover four rather than two years of tuition. In addition, mandatory fees and a $100 per quarter book allowance will be paid for the first time.

July 1, 1995:

- The $100,000 family income-eligibility cap for HOPE is abolished.
- Governor Miller decides to give students who lose their HOPE Scholarships after their freshman year a second chance. If the student completes the sophomore year with a cumulative B average, they will receive HOPE their junior year.
- Nontraditional students (who graduated before the HOPE program began in 1993) may qualify for HOPE after their sophomore year.

July 11, 1995: President Clinton models his America's Hope program, a tax credit for the cost of two year of education beyond high school, after the success of Georgia's HOPE Program.

July 1, 1996: Private college students for the first time must earn and maintain a B average to receive HOPE. As a result, the previous $1,500 grant is changed to a $3,000 scholarship.

November 3, 1996: Entering freshmen high school students (Class of 2000) must now earn a B average in the core curriculum courses of English, math, social studies, foreign language and science to receive the HOPE Scholarship upon graduation.

July 1, 1997: Nontraditional students may now qualify for HOPE after their freshman or sophomore years.

November 18, 1997: The Georgia Student Finance Commission adopts a policy to allow home school students who maintain a B average during their first year in college to retroactively qualify for a HOPE Scholarship during the 1997–1998 school year.

April 1998: The National Association of State Student Grant and Aid Programs (NASSGAP) releases a study that says Georgia is ranked Number One among the 50 states in academic-based student financial aid because of the HOPE Scholarship.

June 29, 1998: The Council on School Performance releases a study that concludes: "We found that recipients of Georgia's HOPE Scholarship are more likely to remain enrolled in college, have higher college grade point averages and have earned more credit hours than students without the scholarship."

September 1, 1998: Five years after its inception, the HOPE Scholarship has awarded 319,000 students more than $580 million.

November 3, 1998: Georgia voters elect to create a Constitutional amendment protecting the HOPE Scholarship Program from legislative and political tampering.

May 17, 1999: For the second year in a row, the National Association of State Student Grant and Aid Programs ranked Georgia Number One among 50 states in academic-based student financial aid because of the HOPE Scholarship.

September 29, 1999: Yomaris Figueroa of McDonough, a freshman at Georgia State University in Atlanta, was congratulated by Governor Roy E. Barnes as Georgia's 400,000th HOPE Scholarship recipient.

March 2000: For the third year in a row, the National Association of State Student Grant and Aid Programs ranked Georgia Number One among 50 states in academic-based student financial aid because of the HOPE Scholarship.

July 1, 2000: Students can receive the full benefits of Georgia's HOPE Scholarship and the federal Pell Grant making a college education for Georgia students even more affordable.

October 2000: Seven years after its inception, the HOPE Scholarship has more than 500,000 awards totaling $1 billion.

March 2001: For the fourth year in a row, the National Association of State Student Grant and Aid Programs ranked Georgia Number One among 50 states in academic-based student financial aid because of the HOPE Scholarship.

April 2002: HOPE reaches new milestones: More than 600,000 students have received HOPE awards totaling more than $1.5 billion. Also, thanks to HOPE, for the fifth year in a row Georgia leads the nation in providing academic-based financial aid.

March 2003: The Georgia General Assembly created the Improvement of the HOPE Scholarship Joint Study Commission. The purpose of the commission was to identify and recommend actions to ensure adequate funding of the HOPE program for years to come.

April 2003: For the sixth year in a row, the National Association of State Student Grant and Aid Programs ranked Georgia Number One among 50 states in academic-based student financial aid because of the HOPE Scholarship.

January 2004: After meeting throughout the latter half of 2003, the HOPE Study Commission made its recommendations in January 2004.

May 2004: House Bill 1325 was signed into law, creating the most significant changes in the HOPE program since its beginning.

January 2007: The HOPE program reaches the milestone of assisting 1 million individual recipients.

May 2007: The new HOPE Scholarship high school grade point average calculation and transcript exchange project was implemented, in accordance with House Bill 1325 passed in 2004.

July 2008: The HOPE Scholarship award amount for students attending private colleges was increased from $3,000 per academic year to $3,500 per academic year. Senate Bill 492 was implemented, which increased the Georgia residency requirement for the HOPE Scholarship to 24 months for students who did not graduate from high school as a Georgia resident. In addition, changes were made to the treatment of post-secondary coursework taken while in high school, for purposes of the HOPE Scholarship and HOPE Grant eligibility. House Bill 152 was implemented, which allows home study student, ineligible high school graduates, and GED recipients to gain HOPE Scholarship eligibility by scoring in the 85th percentile on the SAT/ACT.

March 2011: Georgia Governor Nathan Deal, together with state legislative leaders, pushed a new law into effect, raising the GPA requirements for HOPE and eliminating payments for books and mandatory fees. The new HOPE Scholarship, or HOPE Lite, will now be based on Lottery revenue. The new scholarship within HOPE, the Zell Miller Scholarship, will cover 100% of tuition for those students who graduate with a 3.7 HOPE GPA and receive a score of 1200 (CR+M) on the SAT or a 26 ACT Composite at public colleges ($4,000 at private colleges), and maintain a 3.3 GPA while in college. Books and fees have also been eliminated for this scholarship as well. These changes also added additional academic rigor requirements to take effect in stages starting in 2015 and going through 2017. These requirements define the type and number of specific core academic courses required for graduation eligibility for the Hope Scholarship, including raising the required GPA for students to be eligible for the HOPE Grant to 3.0. Although these changes have taken some of the strain off of Georgia's finances, it has also resulted in about 1/4th of all Technical College students dropping out of college and increases in the accrued debt of those who remained.

March 2013: State Representative Stacey Evans introduces House Bill 54 to reverse some of the changes to the HOPE Scholarship program and, she claimed, help more Georgia students realize their dream and the original purpose of the HOPE program. Her ideas were incorporated into House Bill 372 which lowered the required GPA for HOPE Grants (the HOPE Scholarship for Technical Schools) back to the original 2.0 and bringing back 5,000 students into Technical College in the first year alone.

== Award history ==
Fiscal Year	HOPE Recipients	HOPE Awards
1993–1994	42,796	$21.4 million
1994–1995	98,399	$83.7 million
1995–1996	122,977	$133.7 million
1996–1997	128,354	$153.2 million
1997–1998	136,662	$173.2 million
1998–1999	141,102	$189.0 million
1999–2000	148,194	$208.6 million
2000–2001	169,173	$276.6 million
2001–2002	195,860	$322.6 million
2002–2003	212,631	$361.7 million
2003–2004	222,551	$405.8 million
2004–2005	222,269	$427.0 million
2005–2006	212,581	$436.0 million
2006–2007	207,326	$452.0 million
2007–2008	202,344	$459.5 million
2008–2009	216,165	$522.6 million
2009–2010	248,342	$640.6 million
2010–2011	256,462	$748.1 million
2011–2012	57,203	$53.1 million

== Awards ==
The money provided to HOPE Scholars varies and depends on the type of institution as well as the student's specific enrollment.

=== Public institutions ===
HOPE Award Rate multiplied by the number of hours (up to 15 hours)

=== Private institutions ===
Full-time students: $2,496 per semester or $1,664 per quarter

Half-time students: $1,248 per semester or $832 per quarter

== Application procedures ==
To apply for the HOPE Scholarship, students must follow the registration demands of the school they chose.

=== Public colleges, universities, and technical colleges ===
Students have two options when applying for the HOPE Scholarship:

1) Complete the Free Application for Federal Student Aid (FAFSA) or,

2) Complete the online Georgia Student Finance Application (GSFAPP)

Note: The FAFSA must be completed each year. The GSFAPP remains valid for 10 years.

Application Deadline: The application deadline is the last day of the school term or a student's withdrawal date, whichever occurs first.

Recommendation: Submit the annual FAFSA or the GSFAPP as early as possible; the earlier you apply, the earlier your college can determine your eligibility and awards.

Note: Additional college-specific application and deadline requirements may be required. Check with your postsecondary institution.

== Criticism ==
Non-traditional students were not grandfathered in with the 2011 changes. This has led to allegations of age discrimination because students who had not received the grant before Summer 2011 and had graduated from high school more than seven years past were disqualified based on a new "seven year" criteria that has in subsequent years been modified.

== Similar scholarship lotteries in other states ==
- Bright Futures Scholarship
- Tennessee Hope Scholarship
- South Carolina Education Lottery
- Kentucky Education Excellence Scholarship
