= National Hispanic Recognition Program =

Educational organizations based in the United States

National Hispanic Recognition Program (NHRP) was initiated in 1983 by the College Board to identify outstanding Hispanic high school students and to share information about these academically well-prepared students with subscribing colleges and universities.

Previously, in order to be eligible, students had to be at least one-quarter Hispanic. Each year, the NHRP identified approximately 5,000 of the highest-scoring students from a nationwide total of 250,000 high school juniors who took the PSAT/NMSQT and designated themselves as Hispanic, as well as approximately 200 of the top scoring PAA students from Puerto Rico. The nationwide selection also included students from Puerto Rico, the U.S. Virgin Islands, Guam, and U.S. citizens attending international and APO schools. The NHRP was expanded to the National Recognition Programs in 2019.

== Benefits ==
The College Board does not provide a monetary award to these students. Previously, an important component of the program was the CD-ROM distributed to subscribing four-year postsecondary institutions. The CD-ROM listed the names of all students selected in the program and was mailed in September to subscribing colleges and universities. However, currently, being listed as a National Hispanic Scholar gives students an opportunity to hear from colleges that are interested in communicating with prospective students of Hispanic heritage.

While the program itself does not provide financial support, some universities award substantial scholarships to National Hispanic Scholars. For example, Arizona State University, the University of Arizona, and the University of Kentucky provide the same scholarships to National Hispanic Scholars as they do to National Merit Scholars.

== Eligibility requirements ==
Qualification for recognition is based on the student's combined verbal, math, and writing skill scores on the PSAT/NMSQT taken in the student's junior year of high school. PSAT score cutoffs vary each year by state, but typically range in the high 180s and low 190s. Students must also self-identify as Hispanic on the PSAT/NMSQT. A minimum grade point average is established for the program and this academic information is requested directly from the high schools.

To qualify for this program, one must be at least one-quarter Hispanic/Latino. Hispanic/Latino is an ethnic category, not a racial category, and you may be of any race. For purposes of the NHRP, you must be from a family whose ancestors came from at least one of these countries: Argentina, Belize, Bolivia, Brazil, Chile, Colombia, Costa Rica, Cuba, Dominican Republic, Ecuador, El Salvador, Portugal, Guatemala, Honduras, Mexico, Nicaragua, Panama, Paraguay, Peru, Puerto Rico, Spain, Uruguay, or Venezuela.
