= Chris Meffert =

American lawyer and politician

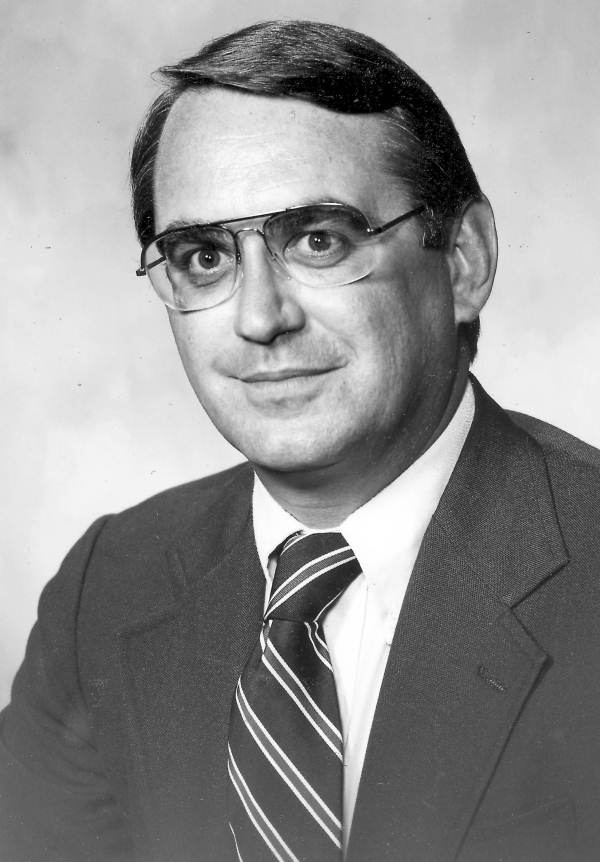

Member of the Florida House of Representatives
- In office 1980–1988

Mayor of Ocala, Florida
- In office 1977–1980

Personal details
- Born: August 11, 1943 Ocala, Florida
- Died: November 13, 2014 (aged 71) Salt Springs, Florida
- Party: Democratic
- Occupation: lawyer

John Christian "Chris" Meffert (August 11, 1943 – November 13, 2014) was an American lawyer and politician.

Born in Ocala, Florida, Meffert graduated from Ocala High School. He then received his bachelor's degree from Florida State University and his law degree from the Florida State University College of Law. He served as an assistant attorney general of Florida and then practiced law. In 1977, Meffert served as Mayor of Ocala, Florida and was a Democrat. From 1980 to 1988, he served in the Florida House of Representatives. Meffert worked as a lobbyist and then was appointed executive director of the Florida State Boxing Commission. Meffert died in Salt Springs, Florida in 2014. He had recently been diagnosed with amyotrophic lateral sclerosis (ALS).
