= Albright (surname) =

Albright is a surname. Notable people with the surname include:

- Adam Emory Albright (1862–1957), American artist, father of Ivan Albright
- Alan Albright (born 1959), American judge
- Alex Albright (born 1988), American football player
- Arthur Albright (1811–1900), British chemist, co-founder of Albright & Wilson
- Betty Nippi-Albright, Canadian politician
- Bill Albright (1929–2013), American player of Canadian football
- Bob Albright (1936–2023), American politician
- Brent Albright (born 1978), American professional wrestler
- Bryson Albright (1994–2019), American football player
- Budd Albright (born 1936), American actor, singer, stuntman, and sportsman
- Carol Bonomo Albright, American writer and editor
- Charles Albright (1830–1880), American politician
- Charles Albright (1933–2020), American serial killer
- Charles J. Albright (1816–1883), American politician
- Charlie Albright, American classical pianist
- Chris Albright (born 1979), American soccer player
- Christian Albright (born 1999), American football player
- Claude Albright (1873–1923), American opera singer
- Clint Albright (1926–1999), Canadian ice hockey player
- Daniel Albright (1945–2015), American literary critic, musicologist, poet
- Dave Albright (born 1960), American football player
- David Albright, American scientist
- Edward Albright (1873–1937), American politician
- Ethan Albright (born 1971), American football player
- Frank Herman Albright (1865–1940), American Army General
- Fuller Albright (1900–1969), American endocrinologist
- Gary Albright (1963–2000), American wrestler, known by the stagename Vokhan Singh
- George Albright (born 1959), American politician
- George W. Albright (1846–19??), American farmer, educator, and politician
- Gerald Albright (born 1957), American jazz saxophonist, keyboardist, and bass guitarist
- Gertrude Partington Albright (1874–1959), British-born American artist
- Hardie Albright (1903–1975), American actor
- Harrison Albright (1866–1932), American architect
- Horace Marden Albright (1890–1987), American conservationist
- Ira Albright (1959–2020), American football player
- Ivan Le Lorraine Albright (1897–1983), painter and artist, son of Adam Albright
- Jack Albright (1921–1991), American baseball player
- Jacob Albright (1759–1808), American Christian leader and founder of the Evangelical Association
- Jane Albright (born 1955), American basketball player and coach
- John Albright (died 1609), Anglican priest
- John J. Albright (1848–1931), American businessman and philanthropist
- Joseph Albright (journalist) (born 1937), American journalist, former husband of Madeleine Albright
- Joseph Albright (1938–2009), American jurist and Justice of the West Virginia Supreme Court of Appeals
- Kelly Albright (born 1987), American politician
- Lola Albright (1924–2017), American singer and actress.
- Lois Albright (1904–1995), American musician, singer, composer, and conductor
- Madeleine Albright (1937–2022), U.S. Secretary of State during the Clinton Administration
- Matthew Albright (born 1991), Canadian football player
- Nat Allbright (1923–2011), American sports announcer
- Nina Albright (1907–1997), American comic book artist
- Parney Albright, American physicist and weapons scientist
- Ray Albright (1934–2017), American businessman and politician
- Richie Albright (1940–2021), American musician
- Susan Albright, American journalist
- Tenley Albright (born 1935), American female skater and Olympian
- Thomas Albright (1909–1986), American baseball player
- Tony Albright (born 1962), American politician
- Wally Albright (1925–1999), American child actor
- Will Albright (1919–1987), American racing driver
- William Albright (musician) (1944–1998), composer, pianist and organist
- William Donald Albright (1881–1946), Canadian agriculturalist and journalist
- William F. Albright (1891–1971), biblical archaeologist

Fictional characters:

- Cyrus Albright, character from Octopath Traveler
- Dorothy Albright, character from the video game series Arcana Heart
- Margie Albright, played by Gale Storm on "My Little Margie"
- Dr. Mary Albright, played by Jane Curtin on 3rd Rock from the Sun
- Sally Albright, played by Meg Ryan in When Harry Met Sally...
