= William Albright =

William Albright may refer to:

- William F. Albright (1891–1971), evangelical Methodist archaeologist, biblical authority, linguist and expert on ceramics
- William Albright (musician) (1944–1998), American composer, pianist and organist
- William Donald Albright (1881–1946), Canadian agriculturalist and journalist
- William Albright (critic) (1945–2026), American theatre and opera critic
- Bill Albright (1929–2013), American football player

== See also ==
- Will Albright (fl. 1950), American racecar driver
