= Parney =

Parney may refer to:

- Parney Albright, American physicist
- Parney Pearlmanta, a fictional character in Tatakau Shisho
