= Electriquette =

Electric vehicle

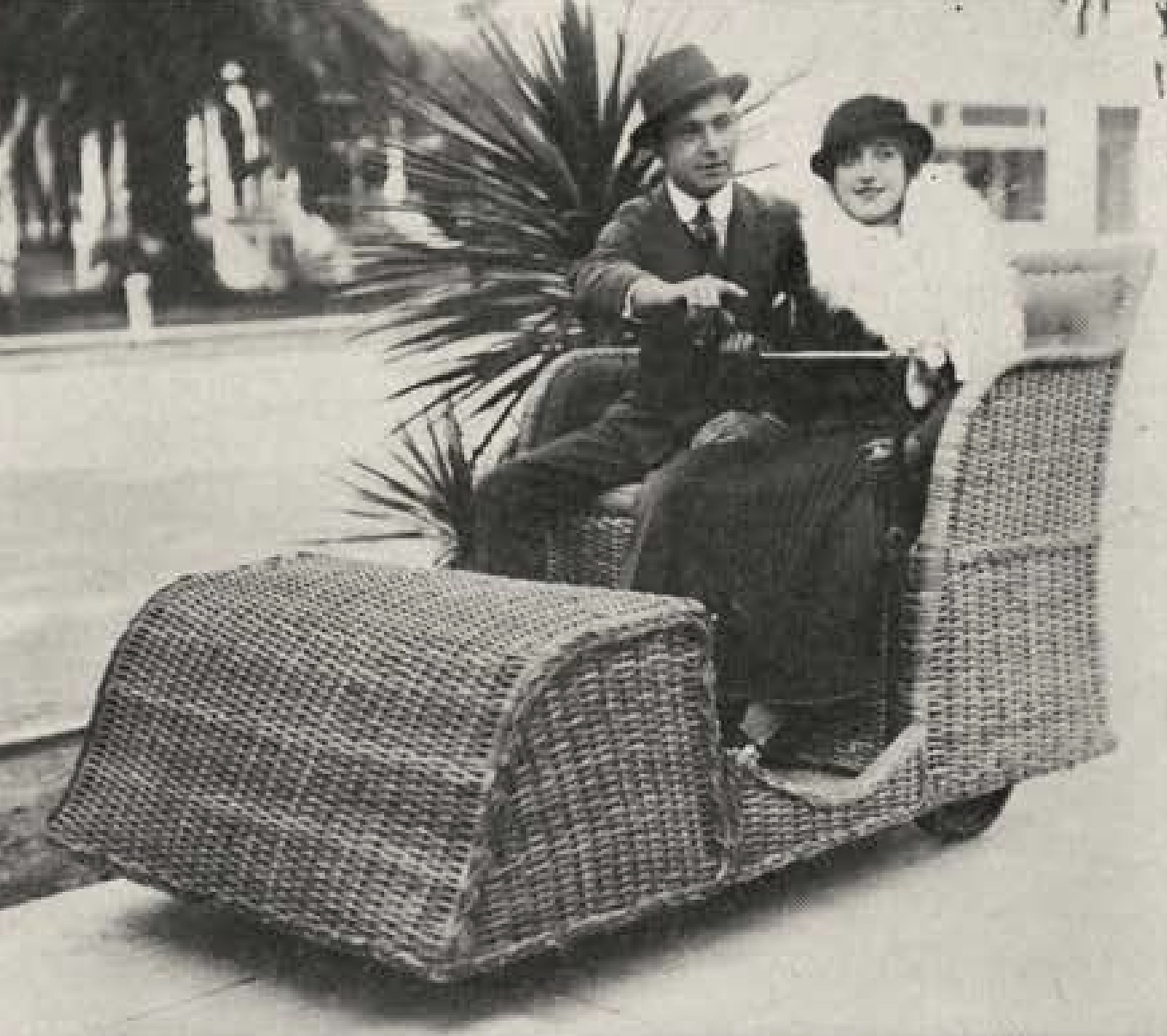
Two people seated in an Electriquette (1915)

The Electriquette was an electric vehicle with a two-person bench seat and exterior made of rattan (wicker). The vehicle was an early form of battery-powered motorized wheelchair or cart, and it utilized a motor manufactured by General Electric. At the 1915 Panama–California Exposition in San Diego, California, the Electriquette could be rented for $1.00 per hour (equivalent to $32 in 2025). A variation of the vehicle was later manufactured for disabled veterans of World War I. No original chairs are known to have survived, but in 2016 new chairs were designed and reintroduced to Balboa Park in San Diego.

== Background ==
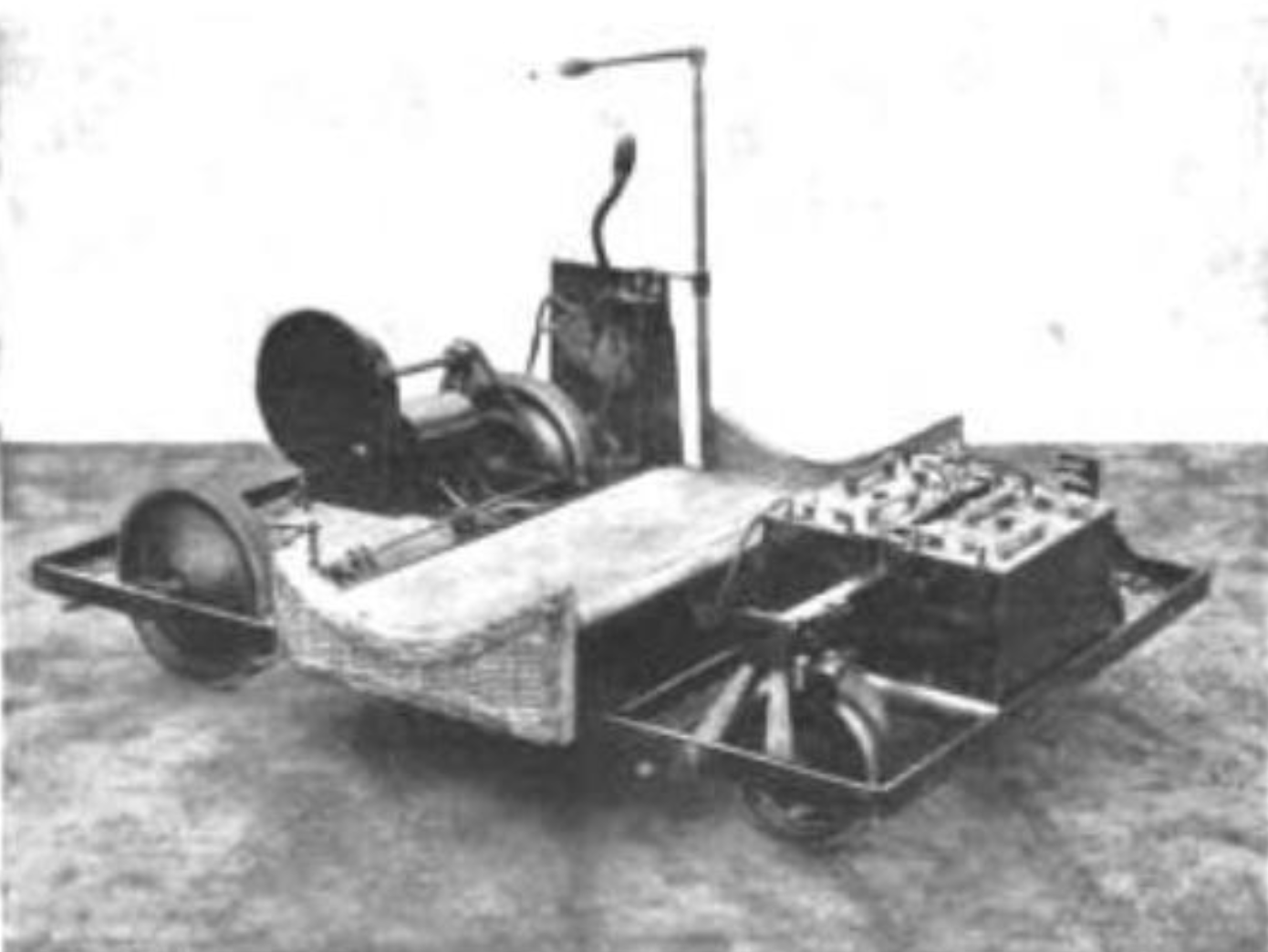
Front view of the Electriquette chassis with batteries visible

The designer of the original Electriquette chair was businessman Clyde H. Osborn. He owned a local electric car dealership and decided to manufacture electric carts which were called Electriquettes. The Electriquette's exterior was made from thick rattan (wicker) and had seating cushions. Osborn started the Electriquette Manufacturing Company in Los Angeles and produced approximately 200 of the chairs. The original chairs weighed 450 lb (200 kg) and they could operate for eight hours without recharging the battery. The Press of Atlantic City described the Electriquette as a two-person "wheel chair" and an "electrically propelled rolling chair", adding that it was "very popular". The Electrician called the vehicle an "electric wheel-chair". None of the original Electriquettes are known to have survived.

== Specifications ==
The wheelbase of the original Electriquettes was 45 in (1,100 mm) and had a frame made of angle steel. A battery was mounted in the front and a motor with gearing was in the back. It had four cast iron wheels fitted with hard rubber tires. The two front wheels were 10 in (250 mm) and they were mounted in "swivel socket bearings" with a tie rod that attached to the chassis. The two rear wheels were 14 in (360 mm), independently attached to the frame with bearings. The motor was manufactured by General Electric and was 12 volts, 14 amperes, 2000 RPM, model GE-1042 producing 3/8 horsepower. A driving sprocket was fitted to one of the rear wheels, and the other rear wheel had a drum brake. The vehicle had 8 inches (200 mm) of ground clearance and the seat was 38 in (970 mm) wide. The Electriquette's power was delivered to the rear wheels by chain and it was stopped with a drum brake, which the driver could engage by hand or foot control. The driver could steer and move the Electriquette with a lever: forward for go, back for neutral. The lever could be raised up when not in use. Each Electriquette had a bell for warning or signaling, operated by the driver's left hand.

== History ==
Two children riding in an Electriquette (1915)

The 1915 Panama–California Exposition in San Diego, California, featured Electriquettes. More than 100 of the Electriquettes were used at the exposition and they had a top speed of 3.5 mph (5.6 km/h). The vehicle could go forward or reverse with one speed. Another feature of the design was that the vehicle would not exceed 3.5 mph (5.6 km/h) even when going downhill because of the gearing. The chairs were numbered and could be rented at a cost of $1.00 per hour (equivalent to $32 in 2025). Test terminals were available at the exposition so that riders could check the battery's charge. The design was similar to wicker pushchairs which were in use at oceanside establishments. "Fatty" Arbuckle and Mabel Normand made a silent film titled Fatty and Mabel at the San Diego Exposition, in which they take a tour of the exposition riding in an Electriquette.

The description of the Electriquettes as found in the Official guide book of the Panama-California Exposition San Diego 1915:

The real, easy, classy, comfortable, luxurious way to see and thoroughly enjoy the Exposition is in an Osborn Electriquette, which supplants the antiquated push-chair and jinrikisha. The only passenger conveyance permitted on the grounds. The simplicity of operation renders experience unnecessary. A child can drive it. It's great fun.

The Electriquettes spread to other areas of the United States. Several resorts in Venice and Santa Monica, California, also began using Electriquettes. The chairs were also used in Palm Beach, Florida, and other health resorts. Many resorts had previously employed people to push resort guests in chairs. A Swiss manufacturer produced a variation of the Electriquette as an electric wheelchair for use by disabled veterans of World War I.

In 2011, an entrepreneur named Sandor Shapery began to design a new Electriquette. Architect David Marshall created drawings. Electronics expert Brad Hunter also contributed to the project. On August 14, 2016, the redesigned Electriquette was reintroduced to Balboa Park. Mayor Kevin Faulconer announced that August 14 was "Electriquette Day". The new carts were made available to rent at $15 for 30 minutes, or $25 for one hour. The cost of each replica Electriquette was about $3,200. In 2015 the San Diego airport featured a replica of the Electriquette in an art exhibit that was meant to celebrate the centennial of the Panama–California Exposition.

== Gallery ==
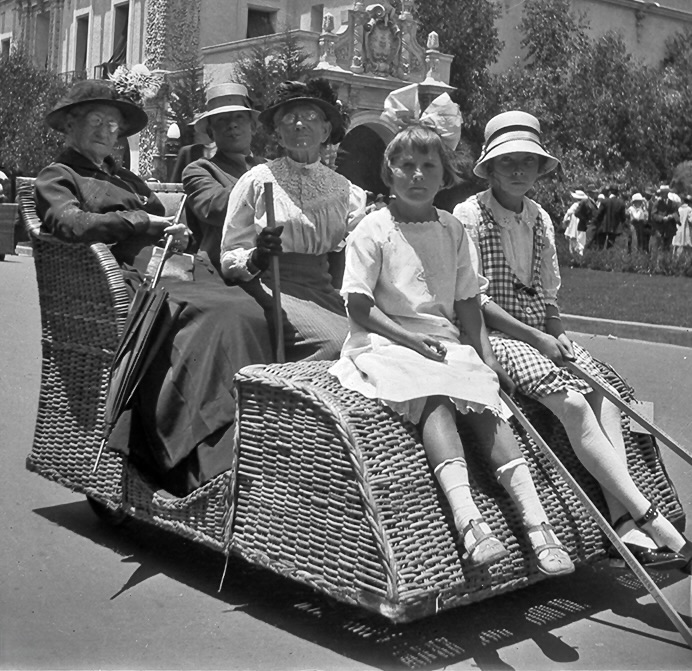
Five people on an Electriquette in 1915

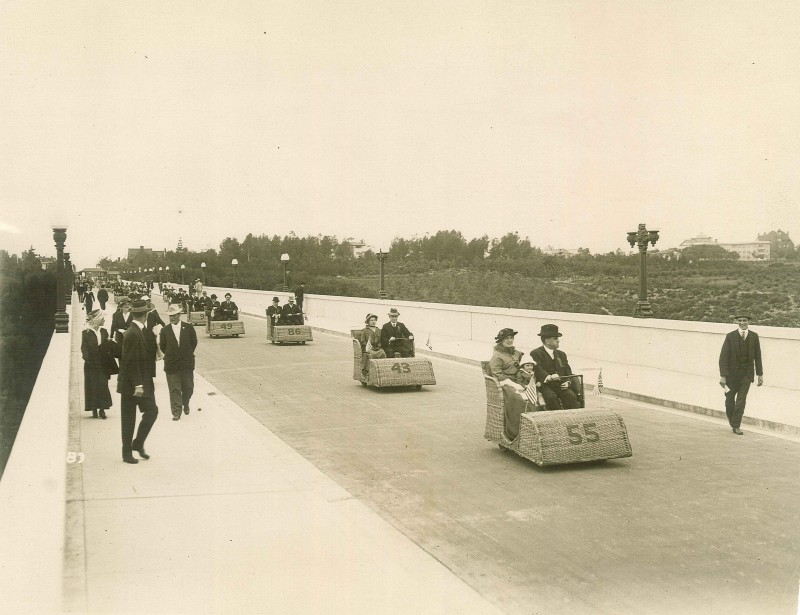
Electriquettes 1915

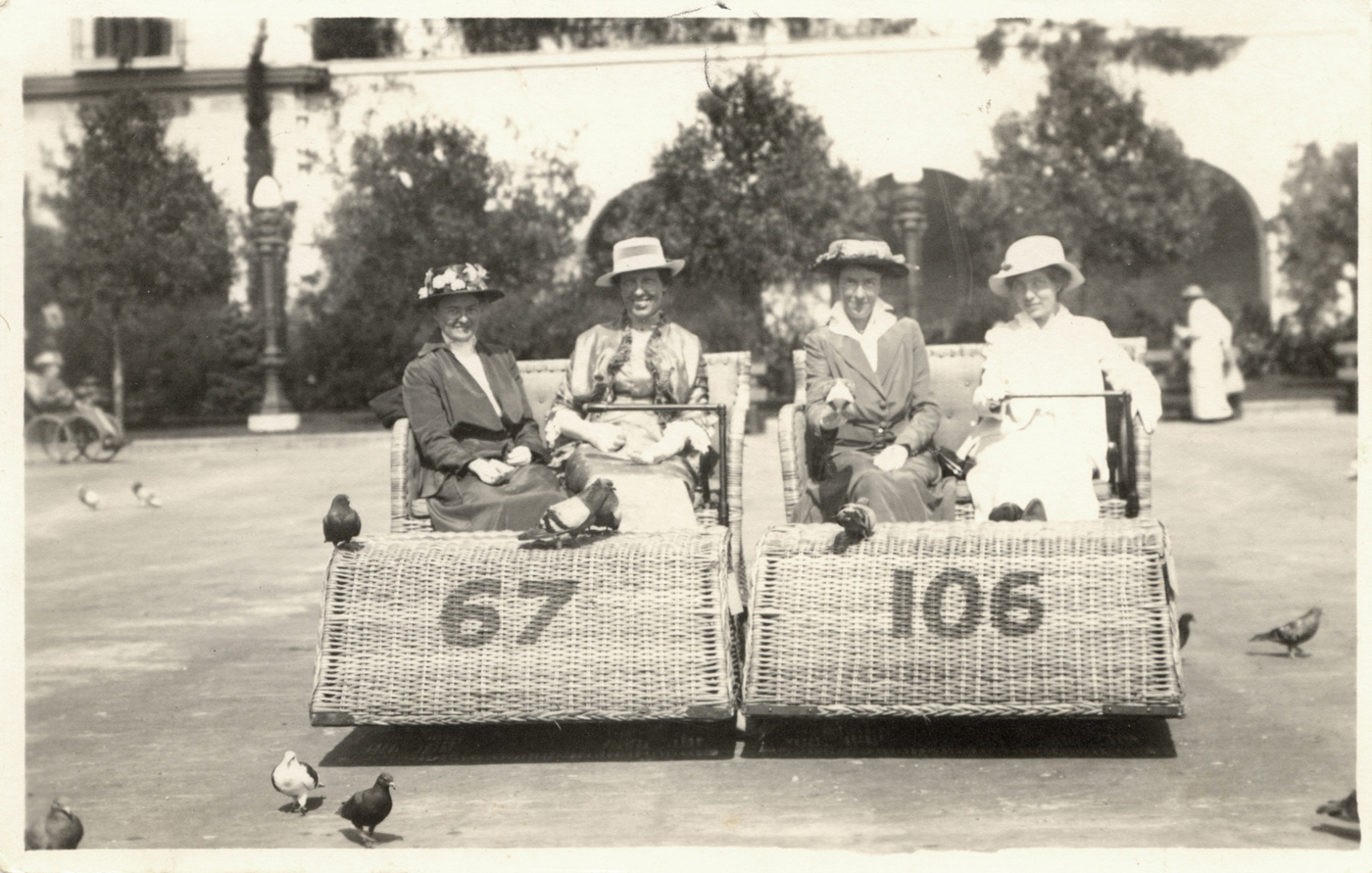
Two women in each of two Electriquettes 1915

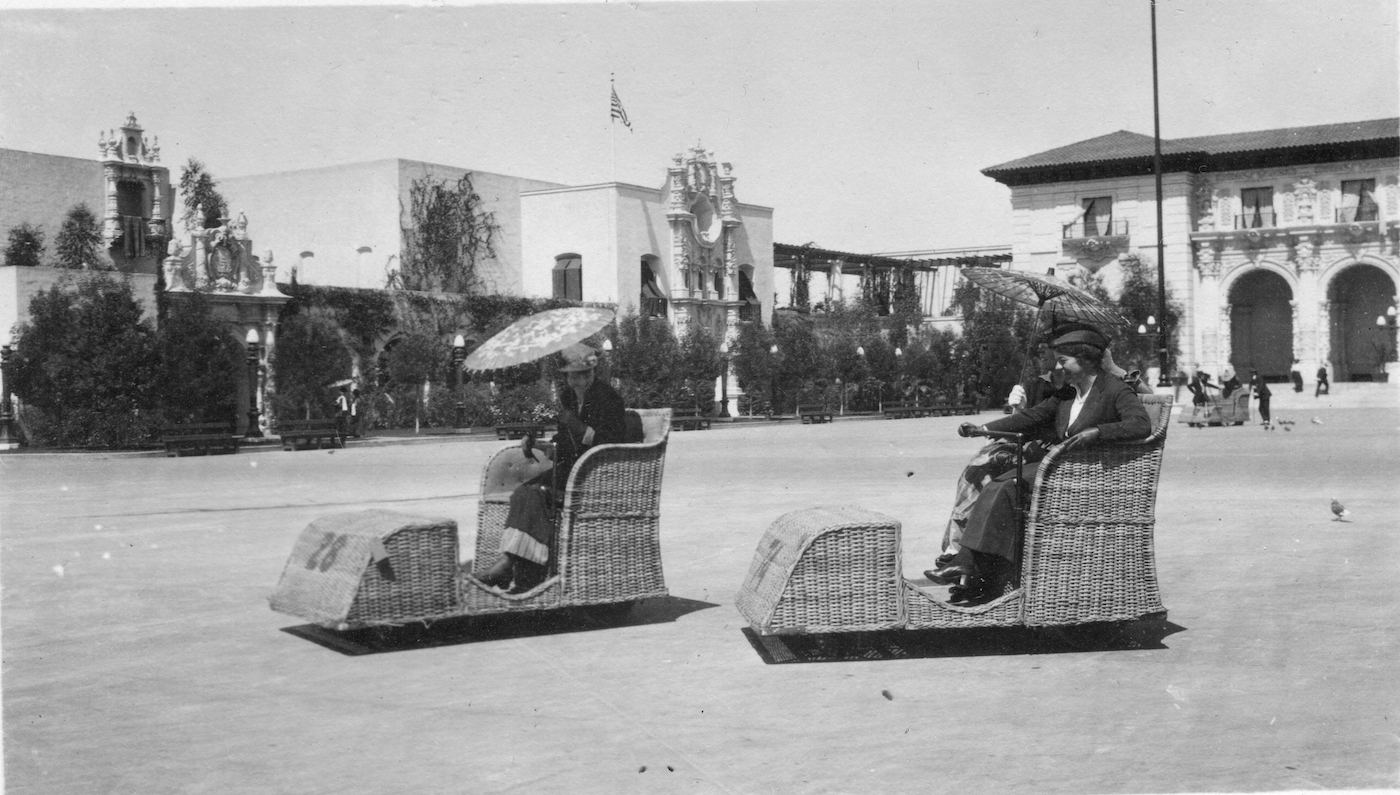
Isabelle Baker (right) races Grace Meeker in the Electriquettes (1915)

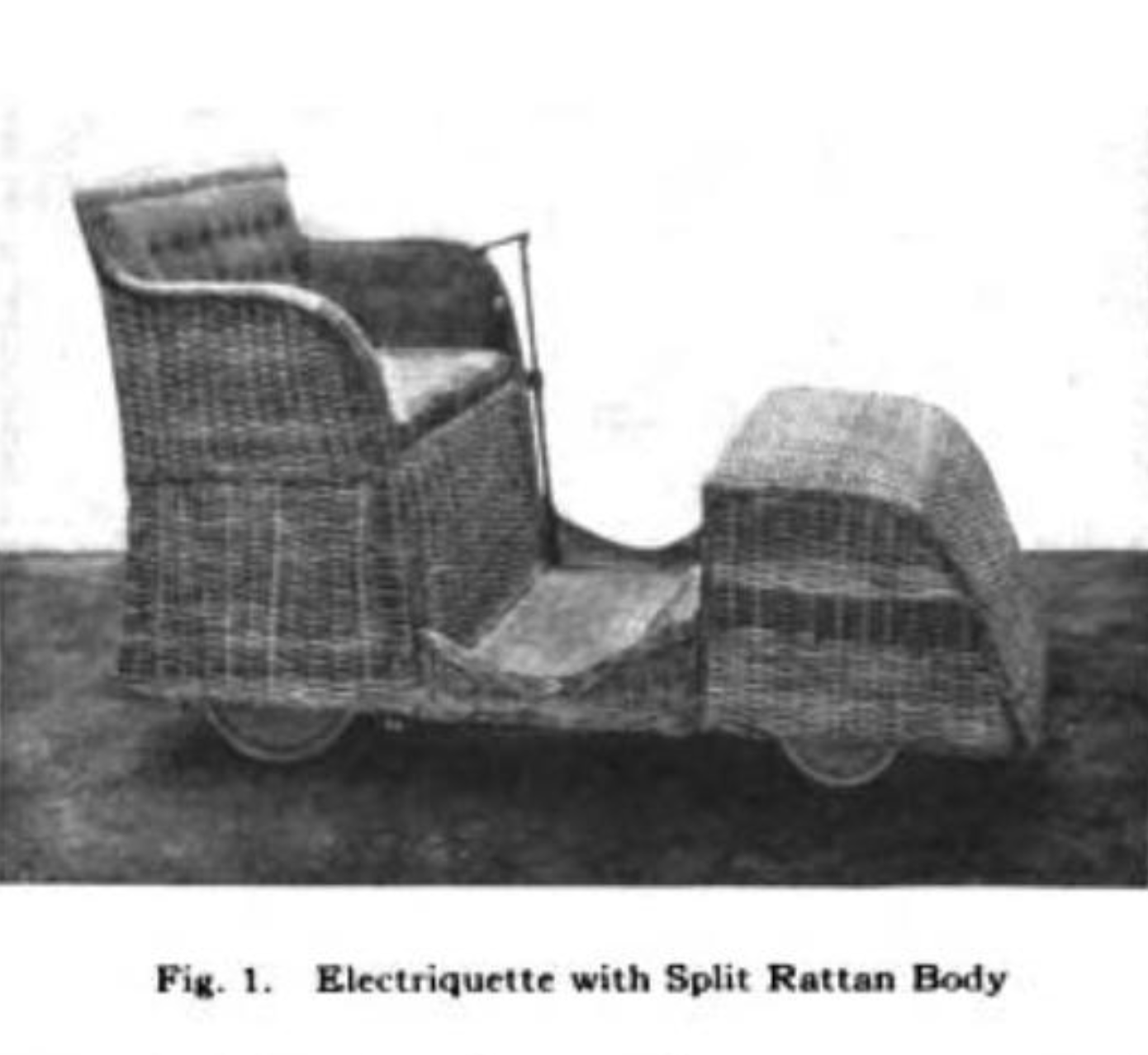
Electriquette body made of rattan (wicker)
