= Claude Albright =

American opera singer

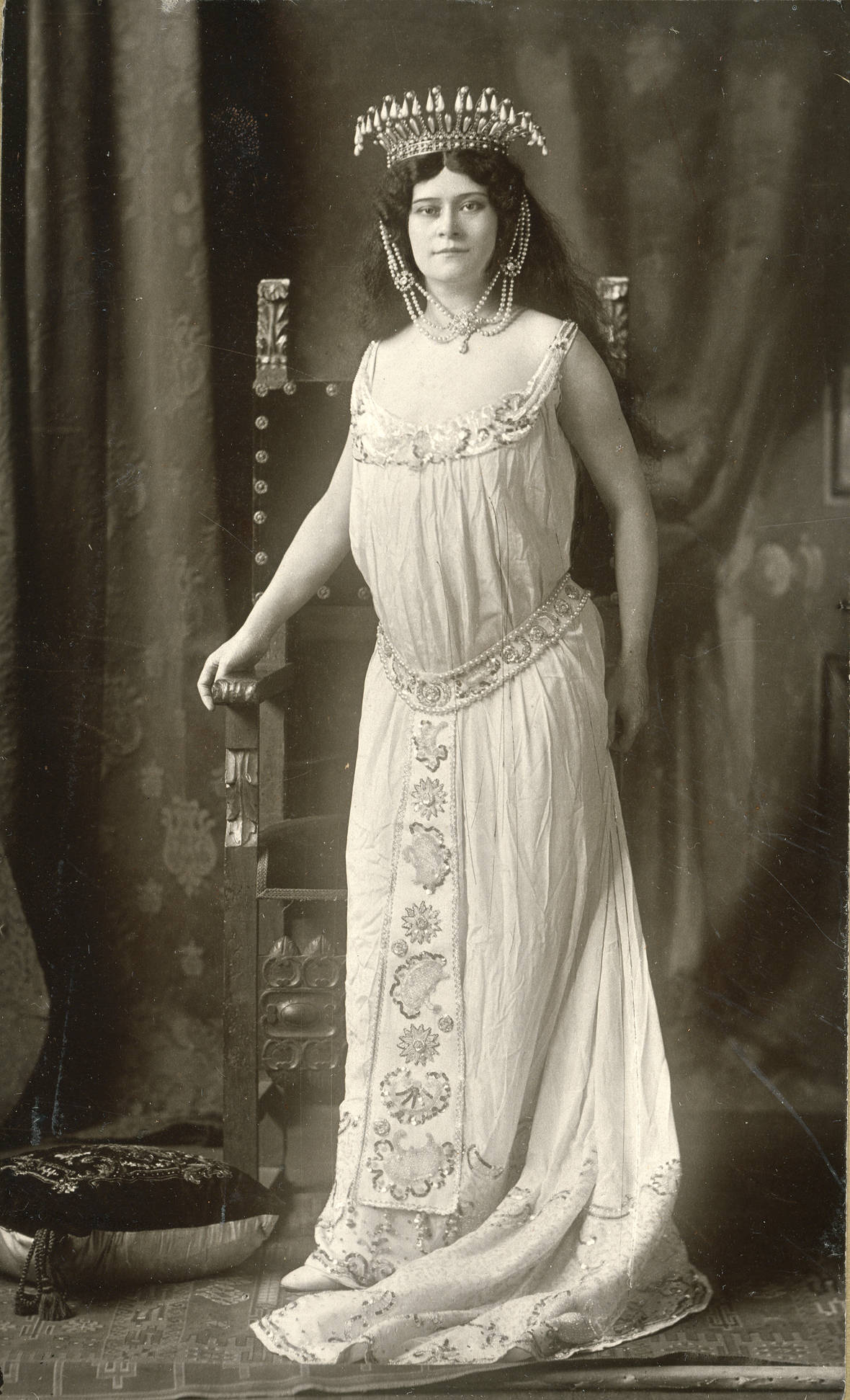
- Albright in 1903
- Born: 5 June 1873; Howard, Kansas
- Died: 26 June 1923 (aged 50); Saint Helena, California
- Education: Vassar College
- Occupation: opera singer

Claude Elwood Albright Roberts (June 5, 1873 – June 26, 1923) was an American opera singer, generally classified as a mezzo-soprano. She grew up in Albuquerque, New Mexico Territory, and was recognized as New Mexico's most famous singer during the early 20th century. She performed with various opera companies during her career, most notably the Carl Rosa Opera Company in the United Kingdom.

== Early life ==
Albright was born in Howard, Kansas in 1873. Her parents were John G. Albright, a newspaperman who later owned the Albuquerque Journal, and Franc Luse Albright, a photographer. The family moved to Santa Fe, New Mexico in 1880, and then Albuquerque in 1882. She attended St. Vincent's Academy in Albuquerque, the Kenwood Institute in Chicago, and Vassar College.

== Opera career ==
After leaving Vassar, she went with her mother to Paris, where she took voice lessons from Anna de La Grange and then joined the Opéra-Comique in 1901. At the time, she was one of only five Americans to have performed there, along with other notable singers like Mary Garden and Sibyl Sanderson. In 1903, she returned to the United States and joined Henry Wilson Savage's Castle Square Opera Company, where she toured nationally in various productions, mostly English-language versions of famous operas. Her best-known roles with the company were as Kundry in Parsifal and Brünnhilde in Die Walküre.

In 1910 she returned to Europe, joining the Stadtheater Bremen and then the influential Carl Rosa Opera Company in London. In Britain she received favorable reviews in a number of leading roles including Azucena in Il trovatore, Ortrud in Lohengrin, and the title role in Mignon. She then came back to the United States in 1912, spending a season with the Aborn Opera Company. Albright's mother and aunt both died in 1912–13 and she had to take time away from the opera to help settle their estates.

She performed at the Panama–California Exposition in San Diego in 1915 and then joined the La Scala Grand Opera Company in Los Angeles for the 1916 season. In 1917 she married Edward W. Roberts, a construction engineer, and largely retired from touring. She died in 1923 of suspected heart failure and was buried at Fairview Memorial Park in Albuquerque.

== Recordings ==
In 1918, Albright made three recordings for Edison Records, which were released as Edison Disc Records under the name Claudia Albright:

- La Partida (Edison 6046)
- Clavelitos (Edison 6051)
- Habanera (Edison 6057)
