= Casa del Prado =

Buildings in San Diego, California

Coordinates: 32.7318°N 117.1486°W

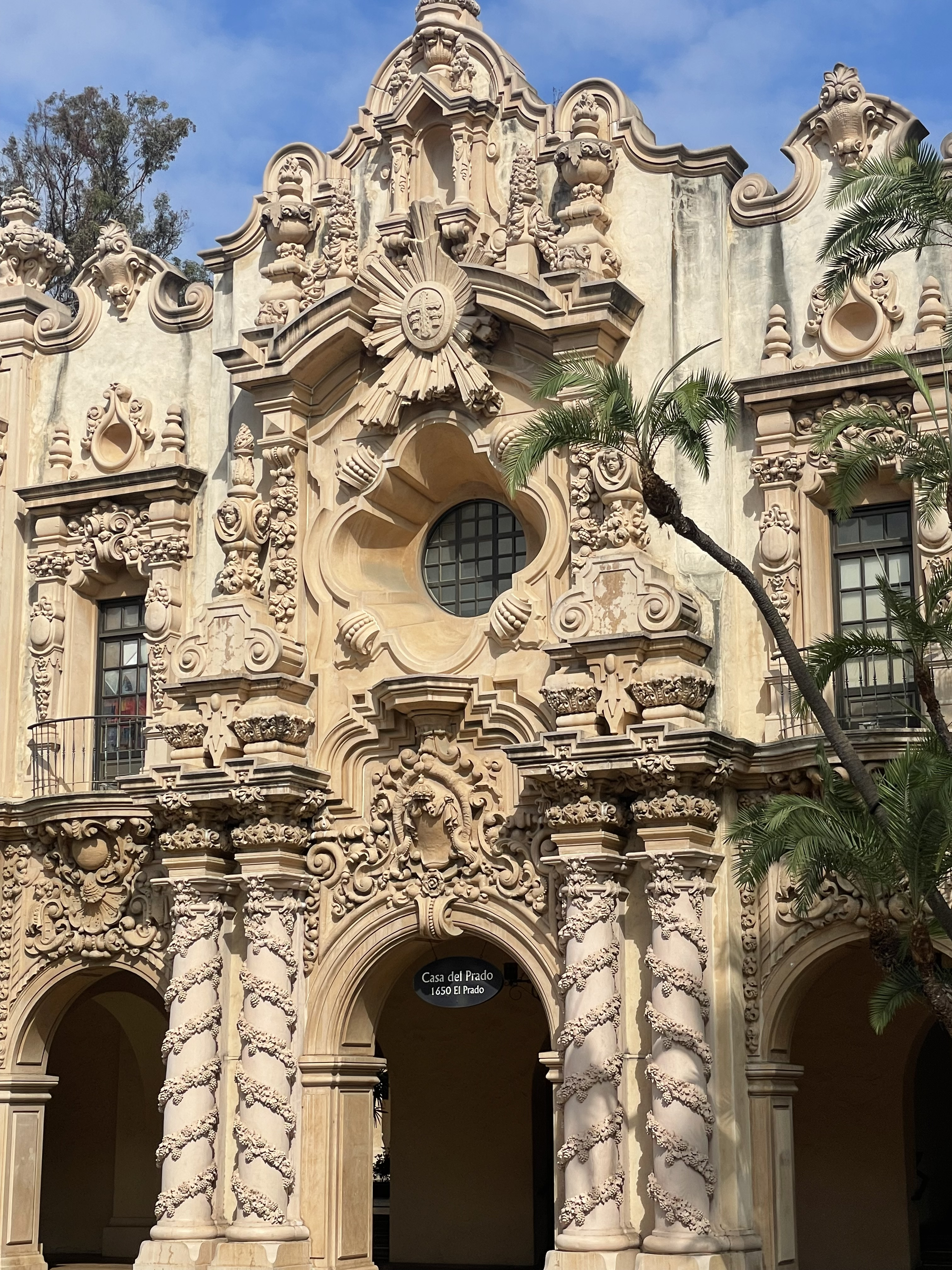
- The Casa del Prado at Balboa Park, October 2024

General information
- Architectural style: Spanish Colonial Baroque
- Location: 1650 El Prado, San Diego, California, United States
- Current tenants: Civic Dance Arts; San Diego Botanical Garden Foundation; San Diego Civic Youth Ballet; San Diego Floral Association; San Diego Junior Theatre; San Diego Youth Symphony
- Year built: 1971
- Cost: $3.5 million
- Owner: City of San Diego's Parks and Recreation Department

Height
- Height: 200 feet (61 m)

Technical details
- Material: Cement render
- Floor count: 2
- Floor area: 50,000 square feet (4,600 m^{2})

Other information
- Public transit: MTS Bus Route 7

The Casa del Prado comprises several reconstructed buildings that were initially built for the Panama–California Exposition in Balboa Park in San Diego, California. Current tenants include the San Diego Botanical Garden Foundation, Civic Dance Arts, the San Diego Floral Association, the San Diego Civic Youth Ballet, the San Diego Junior Theatre, and the San Diego Youth Symphony.
