= Edward Albright =

American diplomat

- Born: August 18, 1873
- Died: May 26, 1937 (aged 63); Nashville, Tennessee, U.S.
- Education: Cumberland University
- Occupation: Lawyer

Edward Albright (August 18, 1873 - May 26, 1937) was a non-career appointee who served as the United States Minister to Finland (1933-1937). In 1937, he took the oath of office to become United States Minister to Costa Rica, but he died in the United States before proceeding to the post.

Albright graduated from Cumberland University in 1898. Before becoming a diplomat, he was a lawyer in Gallatin, Tennessee, and served as owner and editor of Sumner County News beginning in 1907.
