= Lois Albright =

American pianist

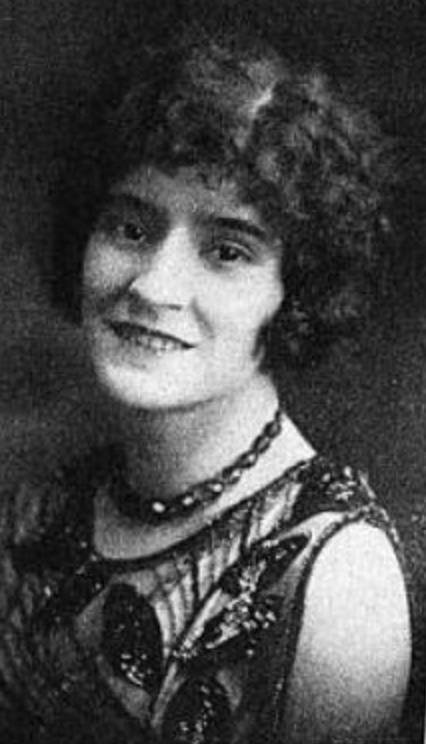
- Lois Albright, from a 1927 publication
- Born: May 17, 1904; Elwood, Indiana, U.S.
- Died: August 26, 1995 (aged 91); Phoenix, Arizona, U.S.
- Occupation(s): Pianist, violinist, singer, composer, conductor

Lois H. Albright Billingsley (May 17, 1904 – August 26, 1995) was an American pianist, violinist, singer, conductor and composer, based in Chicago as a young woman, in Phoenix in midlife, and in New York City in her later years.

== Early life and education ==
Albright was born in Elwood, Indiana, the daughter of Frank A. Albright and Catherine (Kate) Benefiel Albright. Her father was a minister. Her sisters Pearl and Maude were also musical. She began performing music as a teenager. She studied with Sidney Silber, P. Marinus Paulsen, and Louis Luntz.

== Career ==
Albright played both piano and violin in recitals and concerts. After a piano recital in 1927, L. M. Spaulding in The Music News reported that "Miss Albright played with such beauty of expression and masterly technique that she won the keenest attention of her audience." While she was in Chicago, she was active in the Chicago Radio Ensemble, the Chicago Lyric Theater, the Fine Arts Vocal Ensemble, and the Chicago Symphony Orchestra. She was also head of the music department at Harding College for two years.

Albright moved to Arizona with her ailing mother in 1948. She taught voice students and conducted vocal groups from her studio near Mesa. She was a founder and general director of the Phoenix Civic Light Opera Association in 1950, and the Arizona Symphonic Choir in 1955. In 1965, she was the founding director of the Phoenix Oratorio Singers.

Her opera Hopitu, with libretto by her husband Milo W. Billingsley, premiered at Carnegie Hall in 1955, with Albright conducting. The words and music were based on (or inspired by) Hopi chants and legends, and some of the performers were Hopi elders. She toured with the show for several years. She wrote and toured with another opera, Saul and the Medium of En-Dor, in the 1960s.

Later in life, she was based in New York City, where she was conductor and executive director of the Manhattan Opera Singers (MOS); she remained director as the MOS became the Viennese Opera Society.

== Compositions ==
- Alleluja (1954)
- Hopitu (1955, opera)
- Saul and the Medium of End-or (1965, opera)

== Personal life ==
Albright was distraught over the death of her mother in 1953, and expressed suicidal feelings in a note. Later that year, she married librettist Milo William Billingsley. They divorced in 1967. She became blind around the same time; her vision was restored by surgery in 1979. She died in 1995, at the age of 91, in Phoenix, Arizona, survived by a daughter, Gloria.
