= William Albright (critic) =

American theatre and opera critic

- Born: March 3, 1945; San Diego, California, U.S.
- Died: February 27, 2026 (aged 80); Houston, Texas, U.S.
- Education: University of California, Los Angeles
- Occupations: Theatre and opera critic

William Albright (March 3, 1945 - February 27, 2026) was an American theatre and opera critic. He wrote about theatre in The Houston Post from 1973 to 1995, and contributed to the Houston Business Journal, as well as to Opera from 1984 to his death. Other contributions appeared in Classical Voice North America.
