= Parney Albright =

American physicist

Penrose C. Albright
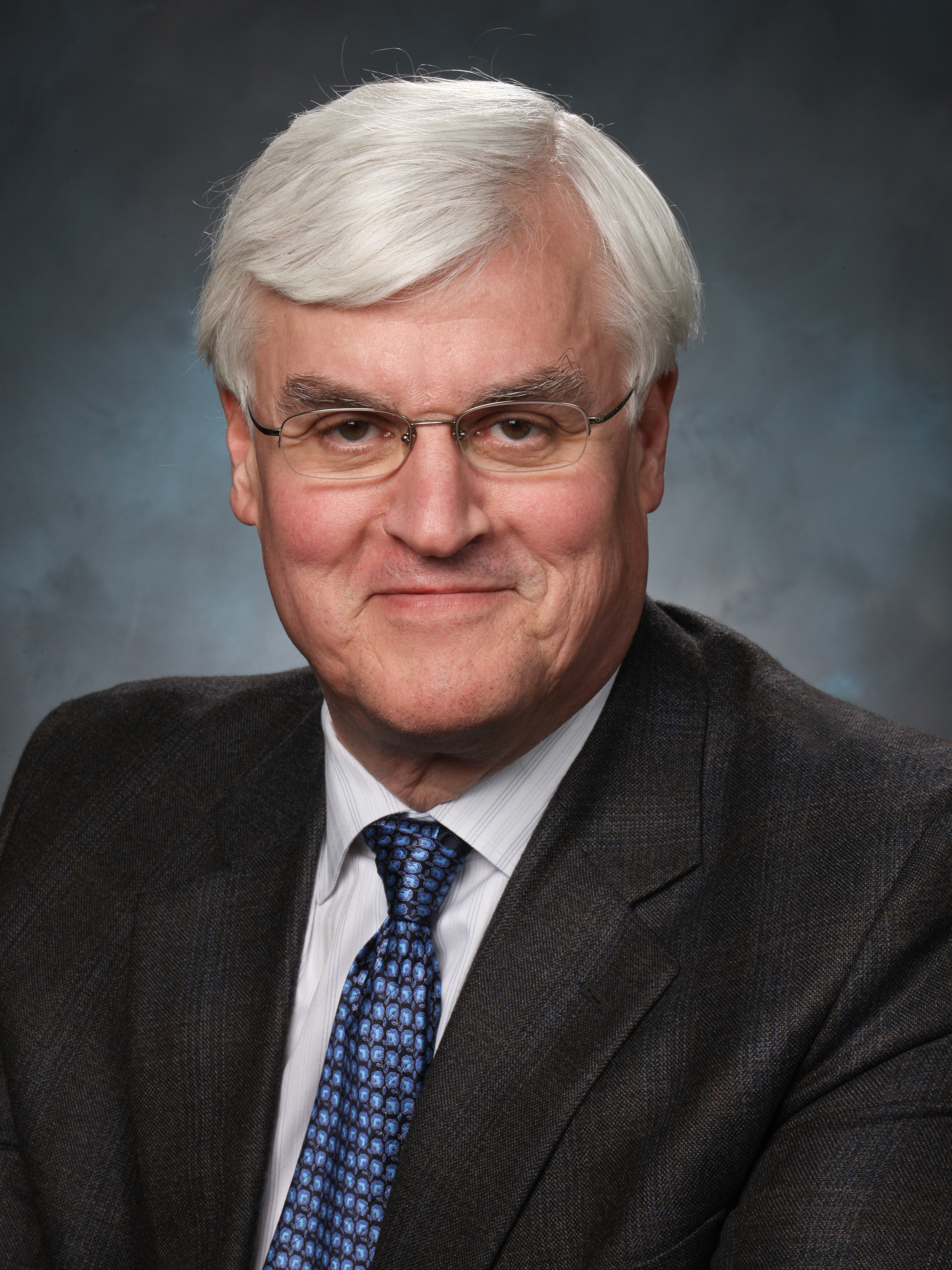
- Albright
- Education: George Washington University; University of Maryland
- Occupations: Scientist, administrator
- Employer: HRL Laboratories LLC.
- Known for: System analysis/Process engineering
- Title: President & CEO of HRL Laboratories

Penrose "Parney" C. Albright is an American physicist known for his work with the U.S. government, think tanks and National Laboratories, and government contractors. Since November 1, 2014, he has been the president and CEO of HRL Laboratories, a research firm jointly owned by Boeing and General Motors. Until December 2013 he served as the director of Lawrence Livermore National Laboratory, and, in 2014, he served as a senior advisor in the Office of the Director of National Intelligence.

== Education ==
Albright received his bachelor's degree in physics from the George Washington University, and his master's and doctorate in physics from the University of Maryland. After receiving his doctorate, he held a National Research Council Postdoctoral Fellowship position at the National Bureau of Standards (now the National Institute for Science and Technology).

== Career ==
=== Private sector ===
From 1986 until 1999, Albright worked at the federally funded Institute for Defense Analyses (IDA). While there, Albright became an internationally recognized expert on ballistic and cruise missile defense systems; space based infrared and launch detection systems; and weapons and sensor system design and analysis. He has served on a number of prominent national-level panels related to missile defense, including the "Welch" Panels on National Missile Defense, the Congressionally-mandated reviews of the Patriot PAC-3 system, and the panel on risk reduction for the Navy Area Defense System. For several years he led study efforts for DoD in ballistic and cruise missile defense, including technical and performance analyses of space-based and airborne laser programs; sea-based ballistic missile defense concepts; boost-phase intercept systems; and national missile defense concepts. He served as technical lead for the joint US-Israeli Short Range Rocket Defense study. He led the study for the Deputy Secretary of Defense that assessed solutions to the MLRS threat in Korea. He was the technical lead for the Theater Air and Missile Defense Modernization panel of the first Quadrennial Defense Review. Albright initiated and led the Joint Land Attack Cruise Missile Defense study for OSD and the Joint Staff. Albright served on several national panels in the area of ballistic missile launch detection systems, including the so-called Everett Panel on space based infrared satellites and the Space-based Infrared Architecture Study. Albright led studies associated with intelligence collection systems, such as hyperspectral sensors for surveillance, and automatic target recognition systems. He was asked by ASD(C3I) to assess future imagery requirements, and their impact on the mix between space-based and airborne collection capabilities. In addition, his analytical skills led to assignment in areas outside of his primary interests. For example, he served on the national panel that reviewed the nerve gas transport modeling of the Khamisiyah release event in Iraq. He also led the analytic team supporting the 1999 Defense Science Board Summer Study, with a focus on the very rapid deployment of ground combat forces and their sustainment. Albright has designed and executed several experiments, including one carried out by the crew of the Space Shuttle.

Beginning in 1999, and until he was asked to serve in the White House after the events of September 11, 2001, Albright worked in the Advanced Technology Office at the Defense Advanced Research Projects Agency (DARPA) where he developed and managed programs associated with special operations, intelligence collection, molecular biology, communications, and maritime operations.

=== Government service ===
Between January 2002, and the establishment of the Department of Homeland Security, Albright concurrently held the positions of senior director for research and development in the Office of Homeland Security and assistant director for homeland and national security within the Office of Science and Technology Policy. He was the lead official within the White House responsible for providing advice to the Executive Office of the President on science and technology issues surrounding homeland security, and on the threat of biological, nuclear, and chemical terrorism. He served as lead author for those portions of the President's National Strategy for Homeland Security dealing with catastrophic threats and science and technology.

In July 2002, Albright was asked to lead the planning for the Chemical, Biological, Radiological, and Nuclear Directorate of the proposed Department of Homeland Security; this later evolved into the Science and Technology Directorate. In this capacity Albright conceptualized the policies and procedures for the new Directorate, including a rigorous planning, programming and budgeting process. He guided the development of its initial programmatic activities; developed the budget; developed the organizational concept; and conducted the initial staffing. Throughout this period Albright was responsible for working with Congress and other departments to achieve the Bush Administration's vision for the new department.

In October 2003, Albright was confirmed by the Senate as Assistant Secretary of Homeland Security in the Department of Homeland Security and served in this position until July 2005. His responsibilities included developing the multi-year strategic planning guidance and budget execution for the complete portfolio of programs comprising the Science and Technology Directorate. Albright served as principal scientific advisor to the Secretary of Homeland Security on issues associated with science, technology, and the threat of biological, nuclear, and chemical terrorism. On these issues he served as the department's primary representative to other US Government agencies, the Homeland Security Council, the National Security Council, the Office of Science and Technology Policy, and foreign governments. As the policy lead for the Department's research, development, test and evaluation activities, Albright oversaw associated intra-Departmental relationships. He served as the principal policy point of contact for the Directorate with the business community, external science and technology professional organizations and societies, private sector interest groups, and with non-federal government agencies on issues of science and technology policy. He oversaw the development of the regulations implementing the SAFETY Act, along with the associated processes and infrastructure, and was responsible for implementing the Department's SAFETY Act policies.

=== Return to private sector ===
From August 2005 to November 2009, he served as president of Civitas Group LLC. While at Civitas, Albright led the analytic team in support of the first Quadrennial Homeland Security Review. In addition, he led the development and publication of a comprehensive Biodefense Net Assessment under DHS sponsorship. Due to Civitas's special relationship with a venture capital firm, Albright served on their investment review board.

From December 2009 to November 2011, he served as principal associate director for global security at LLNL. While leading the Global Security Directorate, Albright emphasized developing and implementing strategies aimed at reducing the barriers faced in deploying Laboratory capabilities outside the traditional NNSA nuclear weapons sponsor.

In December 2011 Albright became the 11th director of Lawrence Livermore National Laboratory. Secretary of Energy Steven Chu welcomed Albright's appointment, saying, "As we work to accomplish the Department's unique national security missions and make the critical investments required for the future of American innovation. I know we have an outstanding partner in Dr. Albright." Under Albright's leadership a number of internal reforms were implemented. Many of these were associated with improved lab-wide planning, budgeting, and communications. Of particular significance were the changes that Albright implemented at the National Ignition Facility in its governance, and in broadening the scientific approaches and talent applied to achieving the goal of ignition after the end of the National Ignition Campaign. He also initiated the planning for conducting experiments at NIF with plutonium. He was instrumental in formulating and then implementing a strategy for the National Ignition Facility that re-emphasized its role in stockpile stewardship. These changes at NIF resulted in much improved relationships with the Department of Energy, the NIF user community, and also resulted in significant advances in ignition science. While at LLNL, Albright argued for science investments in support of stockpile stewardship, and as an advocate for an expanded role in national security for the NNSA Laboratories, Albright worked with the senior leadership in DoD, DHS, and the Intelligence Community (IC) to successfully bring the Laboratory's capabilities to important national security missions. He was the first director of a National Laboratory to visit and meet with the leadership of the IAEA, as well as the combatant commanders at PACOM, SOCOM, SOUTHCOM, CENTCOM, and NORTHCOM.

After stepping down from the director's position at LLNL, he returned to Washington, D.C., and, under loan from LLNL, served as a senior advisor to the director of IARPA and also to the Director of National Intelligence, where he conducted several studies of national significance.

Since November 1, 2014, he has been the president and CEO of HRL Laboratories, a research firm jointly owned by Boeing and General Motors.
