= Will Albright =

American racecar driver

NASCAR Cup Series career
- 1 race run over 1 year
- Best finish: 136th (1950)
- First race: 1950 Race #1 (Daytona Beach Road Course)
Wins	Top tens	Poles
0	0	0

Will Albright is an American racecar driver from Graham, North Carolina. He made one start in NASCAR in 1950. He finished 19th at the Daytona Beach Road Course. He finished 43 of 48 laps.

== Motorsports career results ==
=== NASCAR ===
(key) (Bold – Pole position awarded by qualifying time. Italics – Pole position earned by points standings or practice time. * – Most laps led.)

==== Grand National Series ====
NASCAR Grand National Series results
Year	Team owner	No.	Make	1	2	3	4	5	6	7	8	9	10	11	12	13	14	15	16	17	18	19	NGNC	Pts	Ref
1950	Will Albright	61	Pontiac	DAB; 19	CLT	LAN	MAR	CAN	VER	DSP	MCF	CLT	HBO	DSP	HAM	DAR	LAN	NWS	VER	MAR	WIN	HBO	136th	N/A	
