= Anni von Westrum Baldaugh =

American painter (1881–1953)

Anni von Westrum Baldaugh (August 10, 1881 – August 8, 1953) was an American painter of Dutch birth.

The daughter of Anthonius Hendricus Schade van Westrum, Baldaugh was the youngest of eight in a well-to-do family. She spent much of her youth in the Dutch East Indies where her father, a naval officer, was stationed for work; returning to Europe, she studied art under Petrus Johannes Arendzen in Haarlem, Theodor Zaschke in Vienna, and Lothar von Kunowsky in Munich. She also studied in Paris before moving to the United States in the 1910s. At some point she married Frank Baldaugh, a German army officer, and the couple moved to Los Angeles in the early 1920s. Both had suffered financial losses during World War I, and they were to remain in reduced circumstances for the rest of their lives.

In Los Angeles, Baldaugh joined the California Watercolor Club, the California Society of Miniature Painters, the Bookplate Association International, the Laguna Beach Art Association, and the San Diego Fine Arts Society. At some point during her career she also was a member of the Connecticut Academy of Fine Arts. She collected a number of awards before moving with her husband to San Diego late in the 1920s. During the Great Depression she taught art to supplement her income, taking studio space first in the New Mexico Building and then the Spanish Village area of Balboa Park while living in the Casa de Bandini in Old Town; Frank took a job as an instructor at a Civilian Conservation Corps camp in the Laguna Mountains. Baldaugh was forced to vacate her studio during World War II when the United States Navy took over the property. During the war she taught art to wounded soldiers.

Baldaugh died in El Cajon. Her output, which consisted largely of portraits, tended towards the Impressionistic, although at times she seemed to embrace Fauvism as well. Several of her works may be found in the collection of The San Diego Museum of Art.
