= Spanish Village Art Center =

Art center in San Diego, California, U.S.

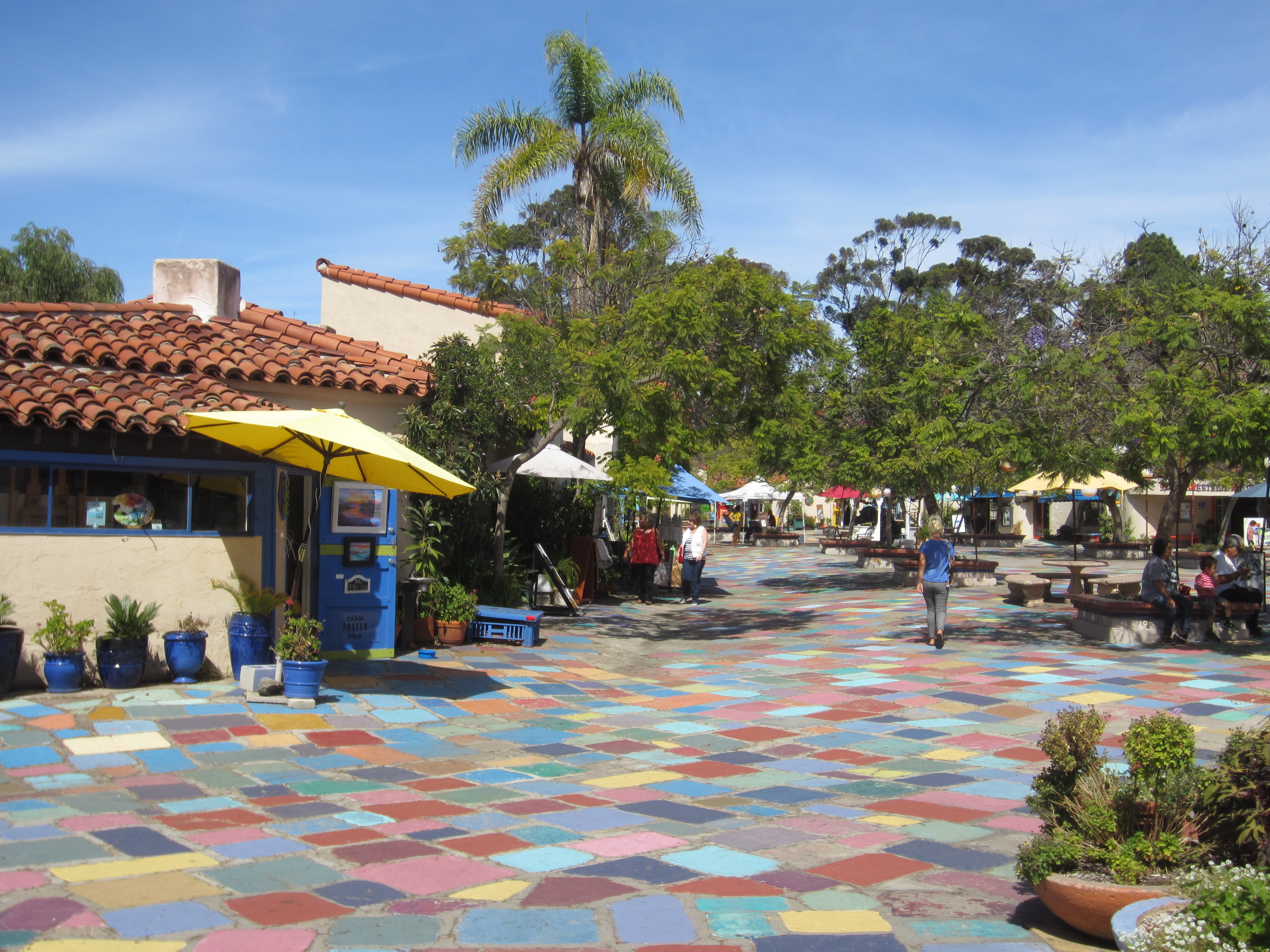
- The site of the art center in 2016
- Location: San Diego
- Coordinates: 32°44′1″N 117°8′51″W
- Type: Art Center
- Website: Official website

The Spanish Village Art Center is an art center in Balboa Park in San Diego, California. Anni von Westrum Baldaugh was among the artists who had studio space at the Spanish Village. Current tenants include the San Diego Mineral and Gem Society and the Southern California Association of Camera Clubs.

== History ==
The art center was originally designed and constructed by architect Richard Requa for the second year of the California Pacific International Exposition in 1935. Although the center was intricately designed to provide simple Spanish architecture, it was not created with longevity in mind, likely to be demolished after the exhibition. That was until painter and photographer Sherman Trease advocated for local artists and proposed that the space be converted into an artist community, in which the empty buildings become art studios and storefronts.

During World War II, the art center became a station for the US Army, forcing the artists away from their spaces. The buildings were left in poor condition by the army after the war ended, but the artists moved back into their spaces in 1947. The artists were allowed these spaces for free as long as they covered renovation expenses and repaired the buildings themselves.

During the 1980s, in an attempt to attract more guests to the art center, artists banded together to paint the many tiles laid in the ground, which are believed to be made of the ruins of demolished buildings in the 1930s.

Today, artists are still part of a large community, as part of a membership program, but must pay the City of San Diego for the spaces in which they work.
