= Balboa Park (San Diego) =

Historic San Diego park

- U.S. National Register of Historic Places
- U.S. National Historic Landmark District
- San Diego Historic Landmark
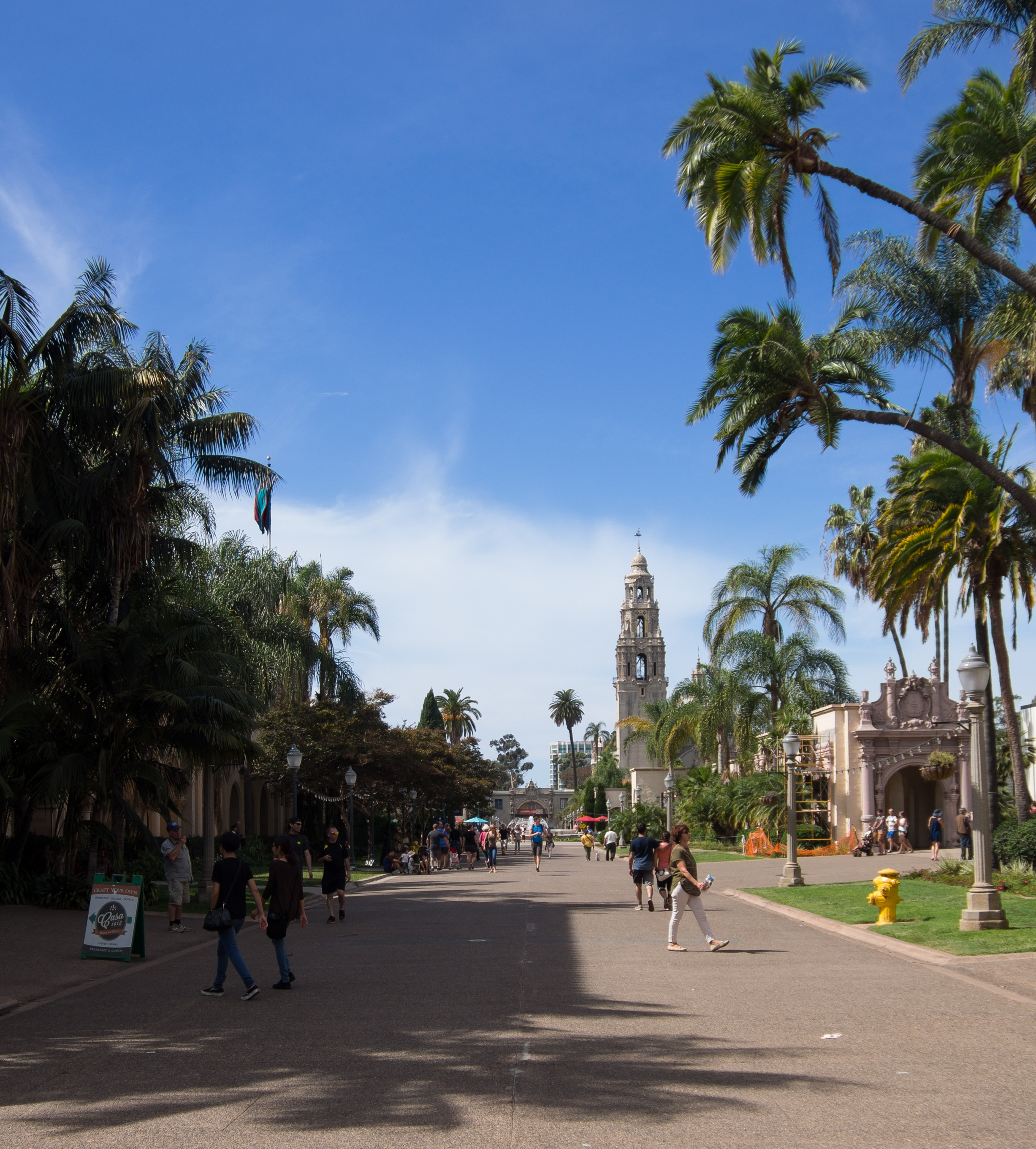
- El Prado, by the Casa Del Prado and several museums.

- Location within San Diego Location within California
- Nearest city: San Diego
- Coordinates: 32°43′53″N 117°08′43″W
- Area: 1,200 acres (4.9 km^{2})
- Built: 1868; 158 years ago
- Architect: Multiple
- Architectural style: Spanish Colonial Revival, Mission Revival, Pueblo Revival
- Website: http://www.balboapark.org
- NRHP reference No.: 77000331
- SDHL No.: 1

Significant dates
- Added to NRHP: December 22, 1977
- Designated NHLD: December 22, 1977
- Designated SDHL: September 7, 1967

Balboa Park is a 1,200-acre (490 ha) historic urban cultural park in San Diego, California. Placed in reserve in 1835, the park's site is one of the oldest in the United States dedicated to public recreational use. The park hosts various museums, theaters, restaurants, and the San Diego Zoo. It is managed and maintained by the Parks and Recreation Department of the City of San Diego.

Balboa Park hosted the 1915–16 Panama–California Exposition and 1935–36 California Pacific International Exposition, both of which left architectural landmarks. The park and its historic exposition buildings were declared a National Historic Landmark and National Historic Landmark District in 1977, and placed on the National Register of Historic Places.

== Park attractions ==
Balboa Park contains museums, gardens, attractions, and venues.

=== Museums ===
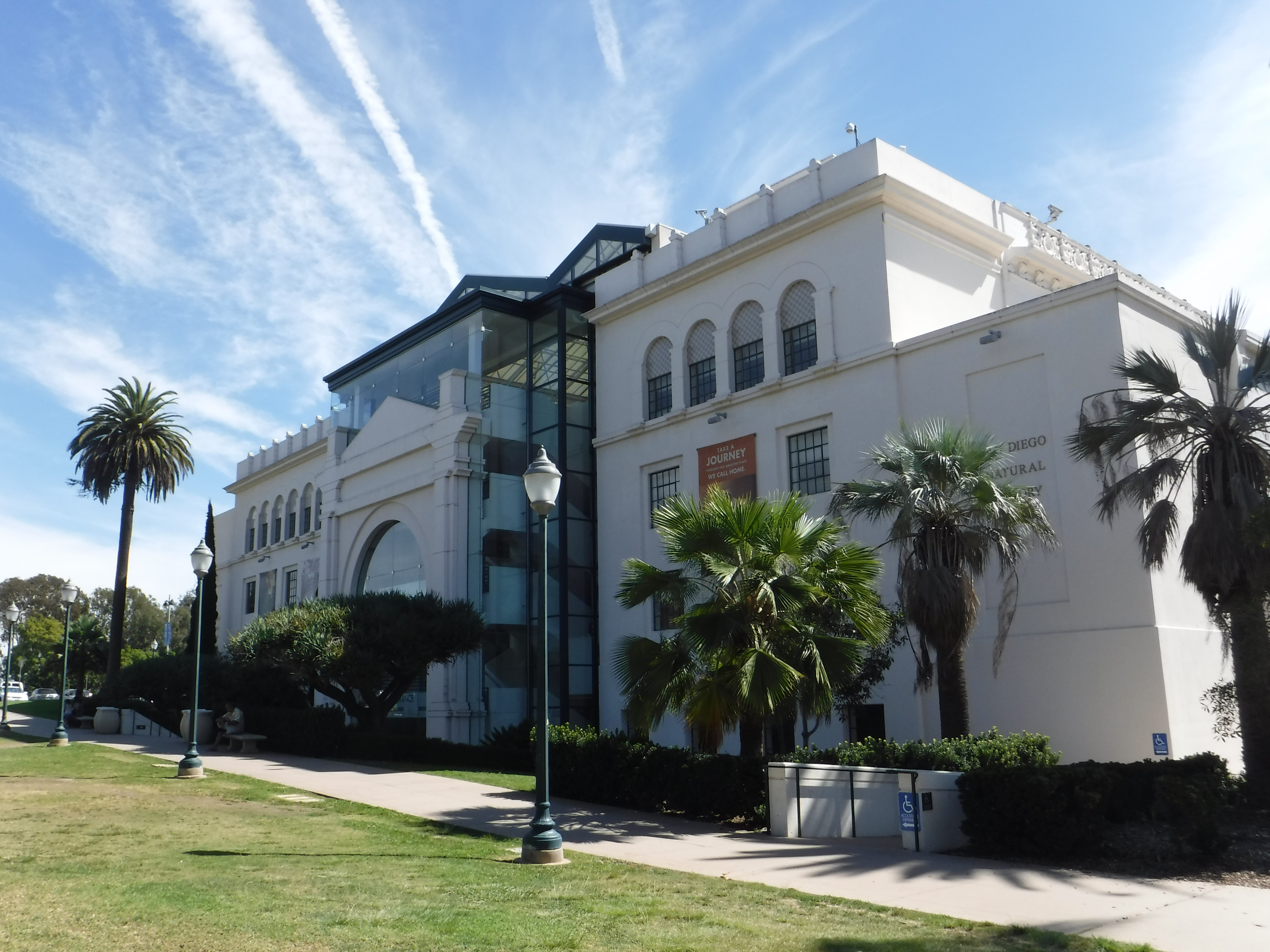
San Diego Natural History Museum

- Centro Cultural de la Raza
- Comic-Con Museum
- Fleet Science Center
- George W. Marston House
- Institute of Contemporary Art San Diego
- Mingei International Museum
- Museum of Photographic Arts
- Museum of Us
- San Diego Air & Space Museum
- San Diego Automotive Museum
- San Diego History Center
- San Diego Model Railroad Museum
- The San Diego Museum of Art
- San Diego Natural History Museum
- Timken Museum of Art
- Veterans Museum and Memorial Center

=== Gardens ===
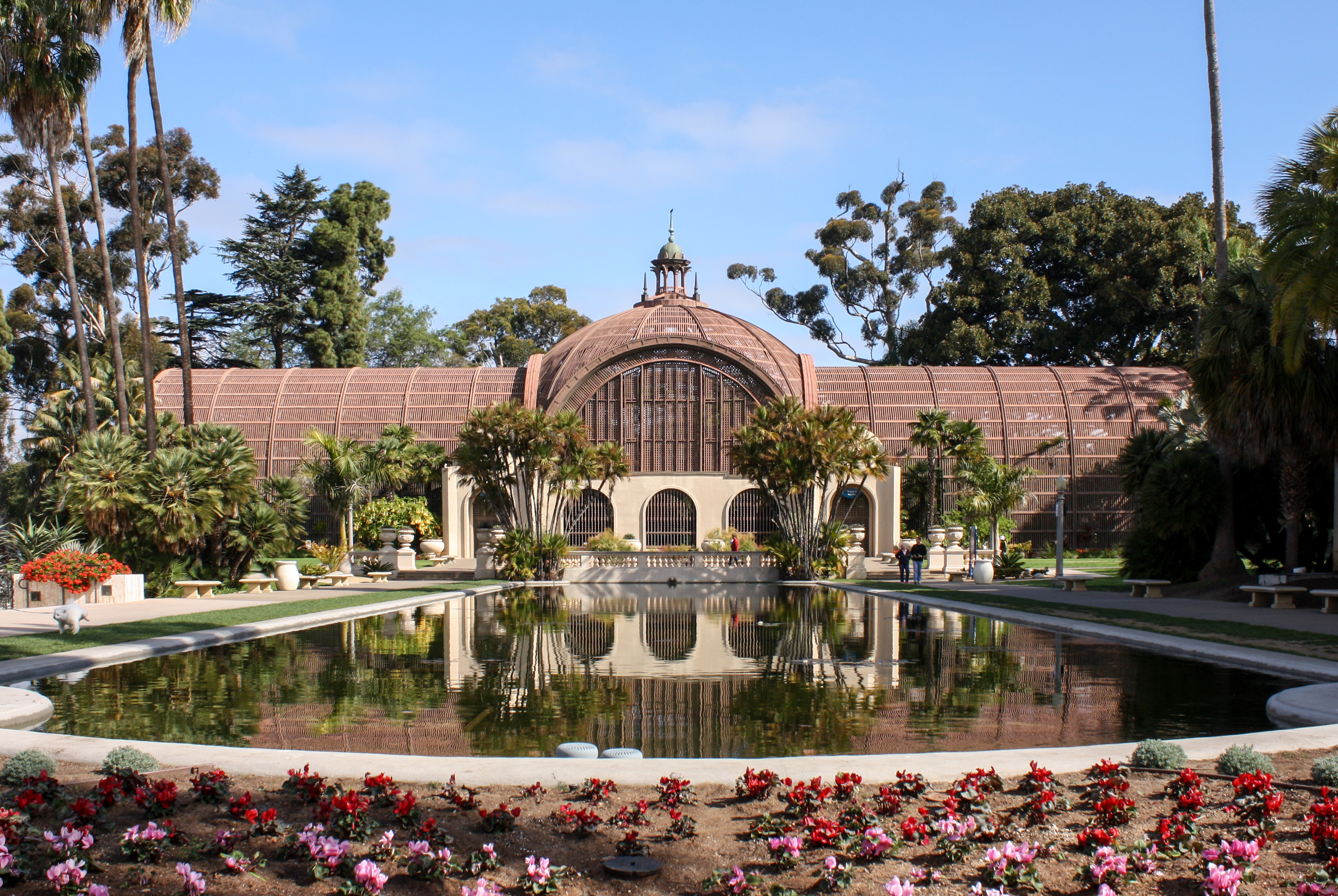
The Botanical Building

- 1935 (Old) Cactus Garden
- Alcazar Garden
- Australian Garden
- Botanical Building
- California Native Plant Garden
- Casa del Rey Moro Garden
- Desert Garden
- Florida Canyon Native Plant Preserve
- Marston House Garden
- George Washington Carver Children's Ethnobotany Garden
- Inez Grant Parker Memorial Rose Garden
- Japanese Friendship Garden
- Lily Pond
- Palm Canyon
- Trees for Health Garden
- Veterans Memorial Garden
- Zoro Garden

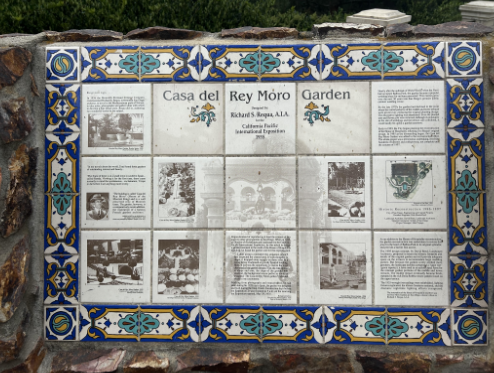
Casa Del Rey Moro Garden tile plaque

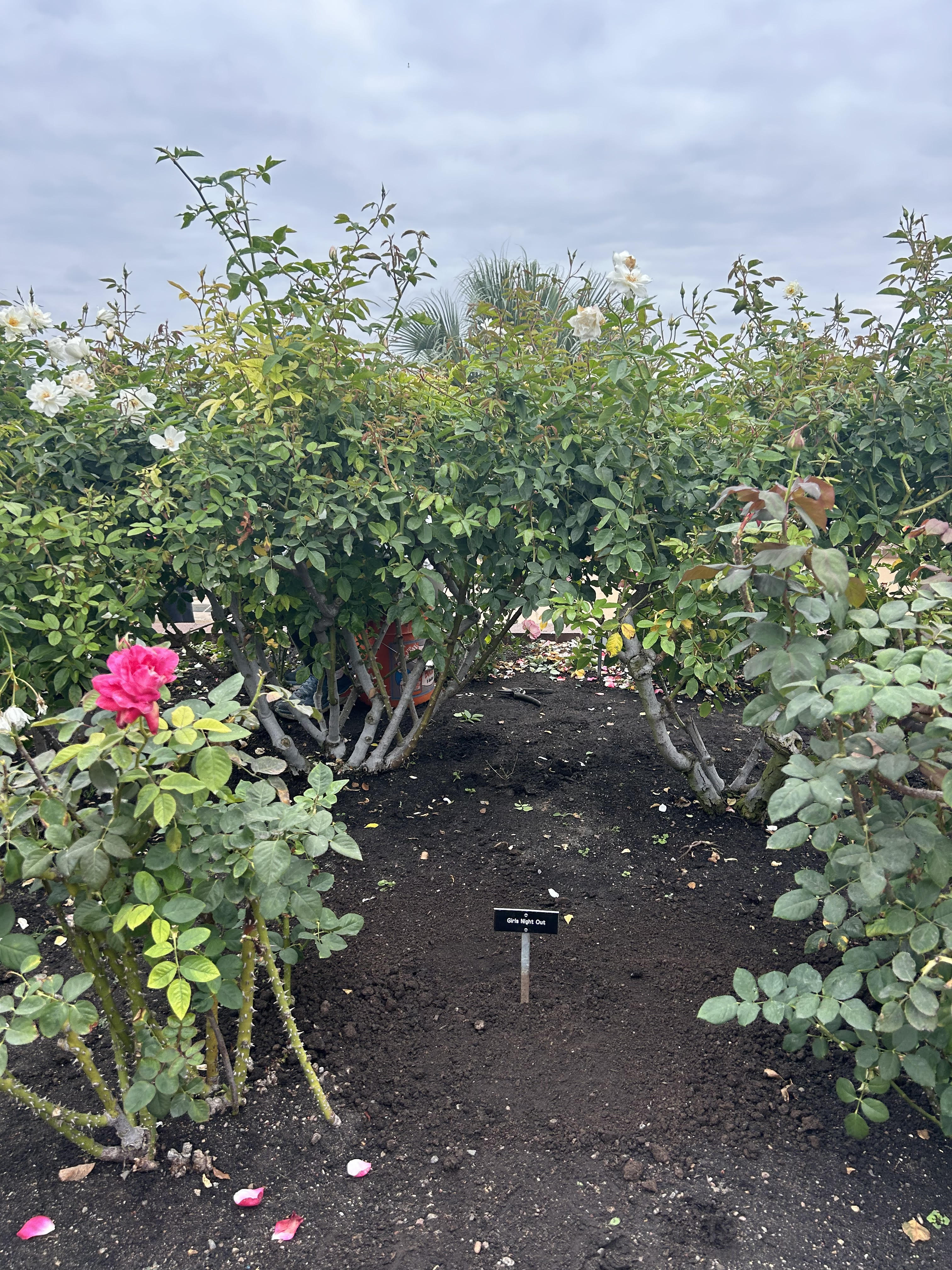
Inez Grant Memorial Rose Garden, " A girls nigh out"

=== Attractions and venues ===
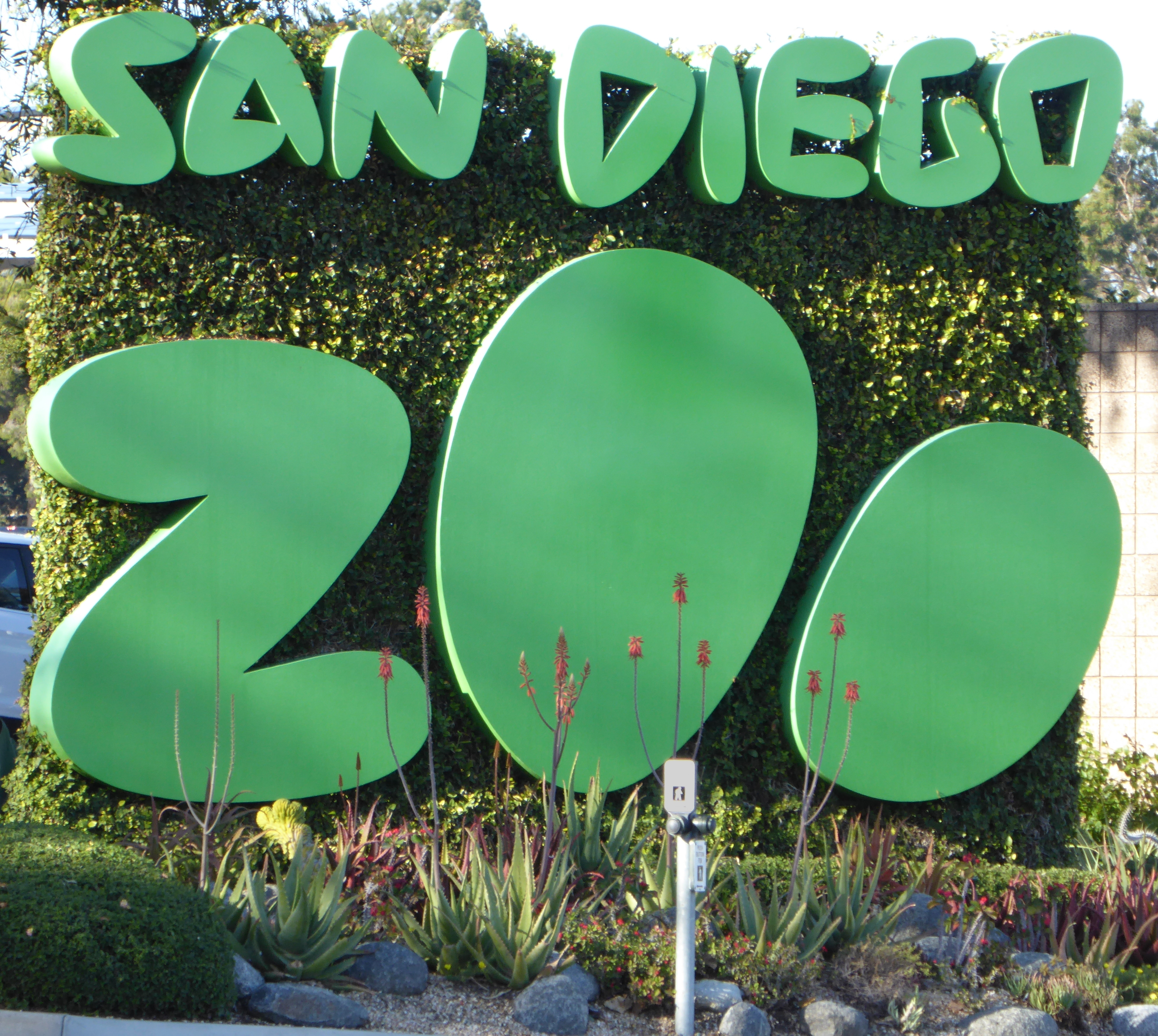
San Diego Zoo

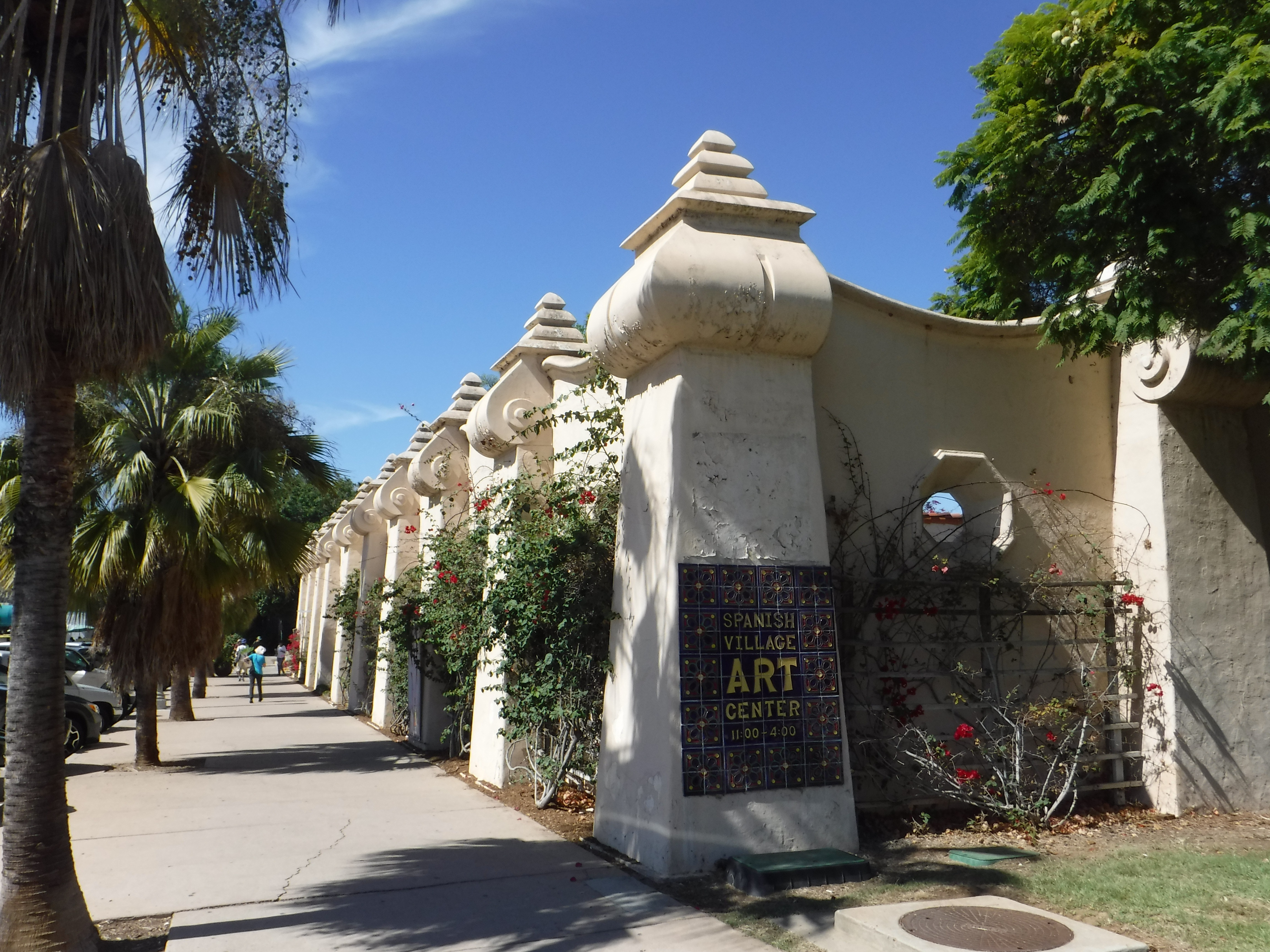
Spanish Village Art Center

- Balboa Park Activity Center
- Balboa Park Carousel, built in 1910 and located in Balboa Park since 1922. It was originally in the location where the Fleet Science Center is now, and was moved to its current spot near the Zoo entrance in 1968. It retains most of its 100-year-old original equipment: 52 hand-carved wooden animals and four chariots, a 10-horsepower General Electric motor, same music, same oil paintings.
- Balboa Park Club
- Balboa Park Lawn Bowling Greens
- Rube Powell Archery Range
- Balboa Stadium
- Casa de Balboa
- Casa del Prado
  - home of San Diego Youth Symphony and the San Diego Junior Theatre
- Electriquette (1915 electric-powered wicker carts)
- House of Pacific Relations International Cottages
  - House of France
- Morley Field Sports Complex
  - Balboa Park Golf Course
  - Bud Kearns Memorial Swimming Pool
  - Morley Field Archery Range
  - Morley Field Ballpark & baseball/softball complex
  - Morley Field Bocce Ball Courts
  - Morley Field Cross Country Course
  - Morley Field Disc Golf Course
  - Morley Field Dog Park
  - Morley Field Petanqueodrome
  - Morley Field Remote Control Race Car Track
  - Morley Field Tennis Stadium & Balboa Tennis Club complex
  - San Diego Velodrome
- Municipal Gymnasium
- Old Globe Theatre
- Palisades Building
  - home of Recital Hall and the Marie Hitchcock Puppet Theater
- San Diego Zoo
  - the Zoo operates the Balboa Park Miniature Train (16 in (406 mm) gauge)
- Spanish Village Art Center
  - home of the San Diego Mineral and Gem Society
- Spreckels Organ Pavilion
- Starlight Bowl
- War Memorial Building
- WorldBeat Cultural Center

== Geography ==
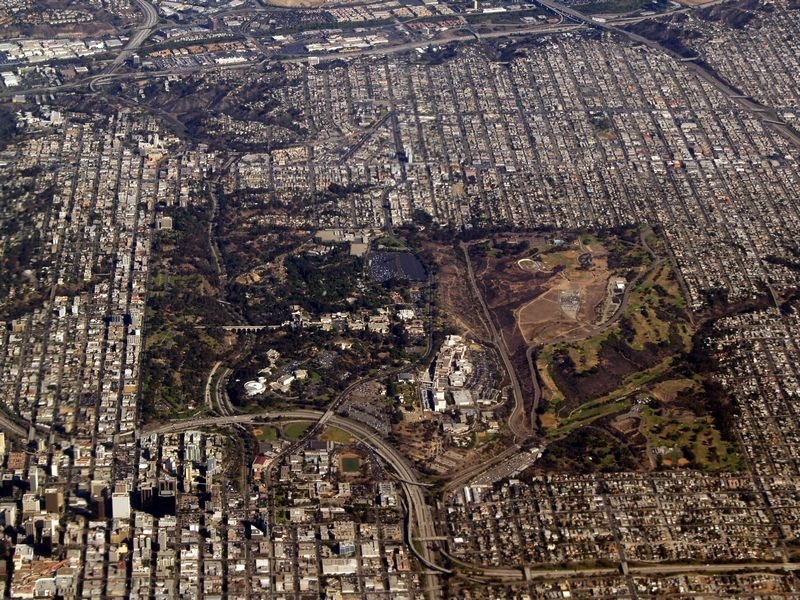
Aerial view of Balboa Park and Central San Diego

The park is essentially rectangular, bounded by Sixth Avenue to the west, Upas Street to the north, 28th Street to the east, and Russ Boulevard to the south. The rectangle has been modified by the addition of the Marston Hills natural area in the northwest corner of the park, while the southwest corner of the rectangle is occupied by a portion of the Cortez Hill neighborhood of downtown San Diego and San Diego High School, both of which are separated from the park by Interstate 5. Also encroaching on the northern perimeter of the park is Roosevelt Middle School.

Two north-south canyons—Cabrillo Canyon and Florida Canyon—traverse the park and separate it into three mesas. The Sixth Avenue Mesa is a narrow strip bordering Sixth Avenue on the western edge of the park, which provides areas of passive recreation, grassy spaces, and tree groves, and a camp for Camp Fire. The Central Mesa is home to much of the park's cultural facilities, and includes scout camps, the San Diego Zoo, the Prado, and Inspiration Point. East Mesa is home to Morley Field and many of the active recreation facilities in the park.

The park is crossed by several freeways, which take up a total of 111 acres (0.45 km^{2}) once designated for parkland. In 1948, State Route 163 was built through Cabrillo Canyon and under the Cabrillo Bridge. This stretch of road, initially named the Cabrillo Freeway, has been called one of America's most beautiful parkways. A portion of Interstate 5 was built in the park in the 1950s.

The city of San Diego is making a new plan for Balboa Park. The old plan is from 1989 and the park needs many repairs today. The process needs 1 billion dollars to fix different areas. This plan will take two years to finish.

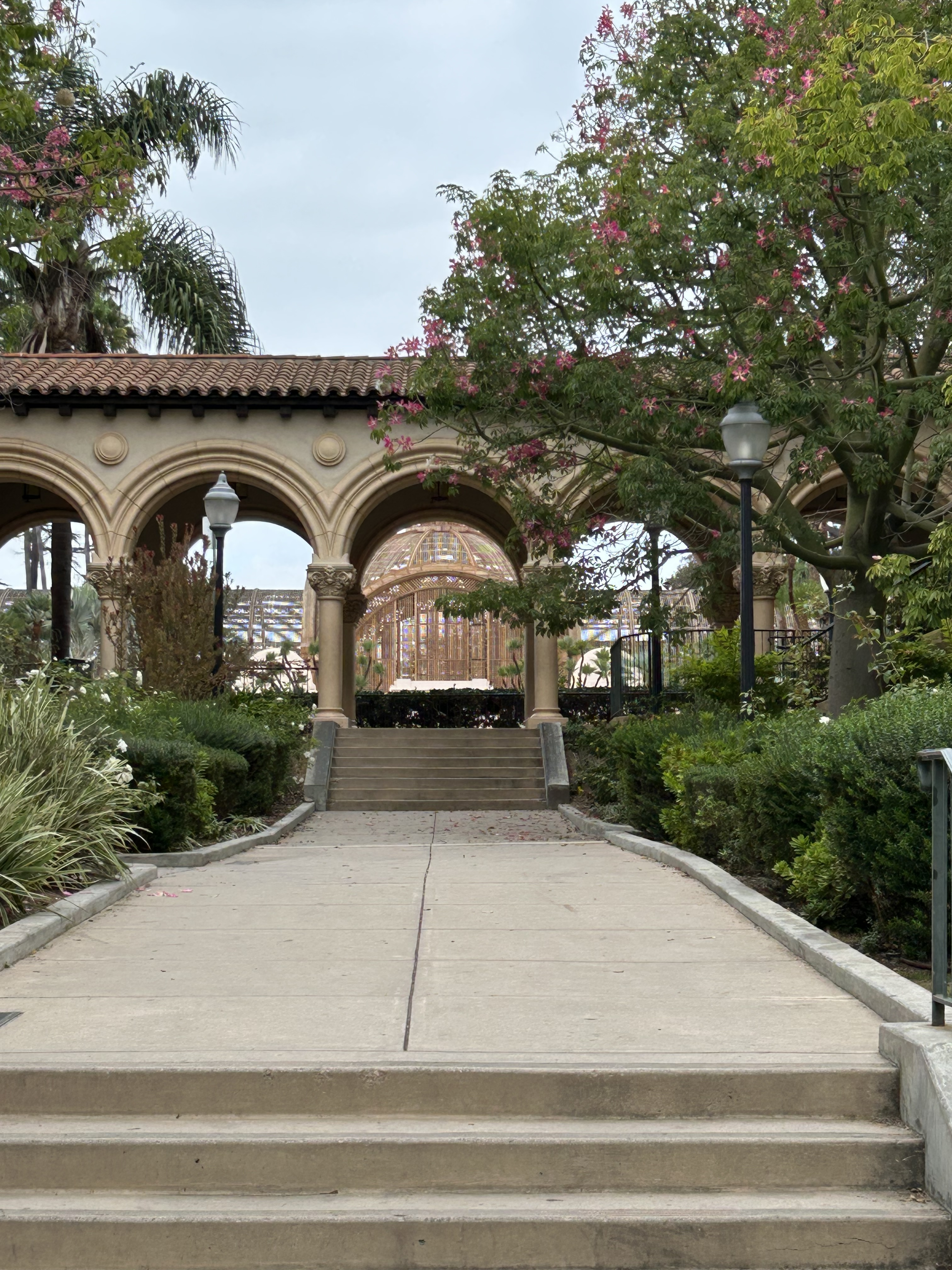
Walkway into Balboa Park with arches, 2024

Surrounding the park are many of San Diego's older neighborhoods, including Downtown, Bankers Hill, North Park, and Golden Hill.

=== Park layout ===
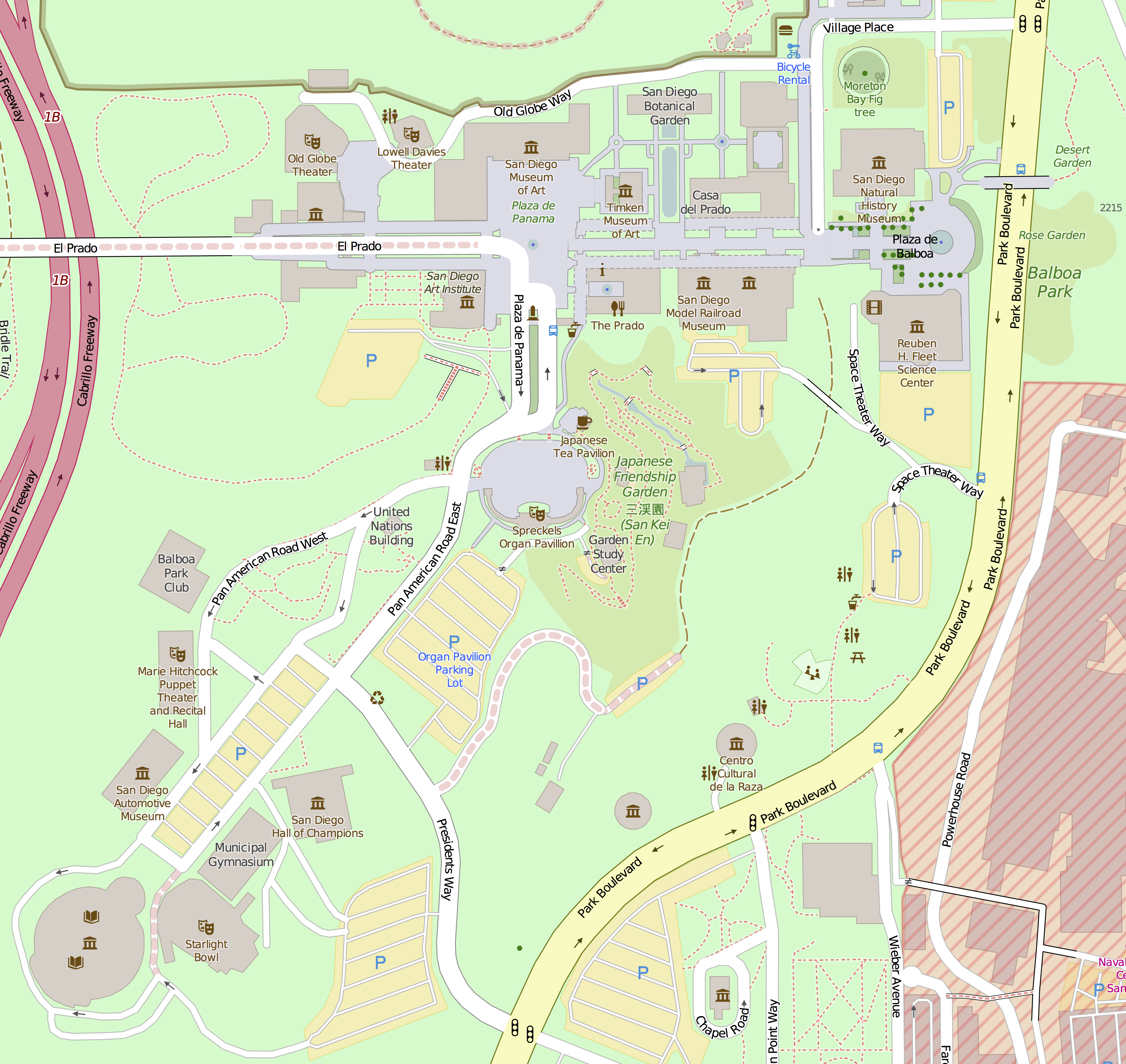
Map of Balboa Park museums and cultural institutions

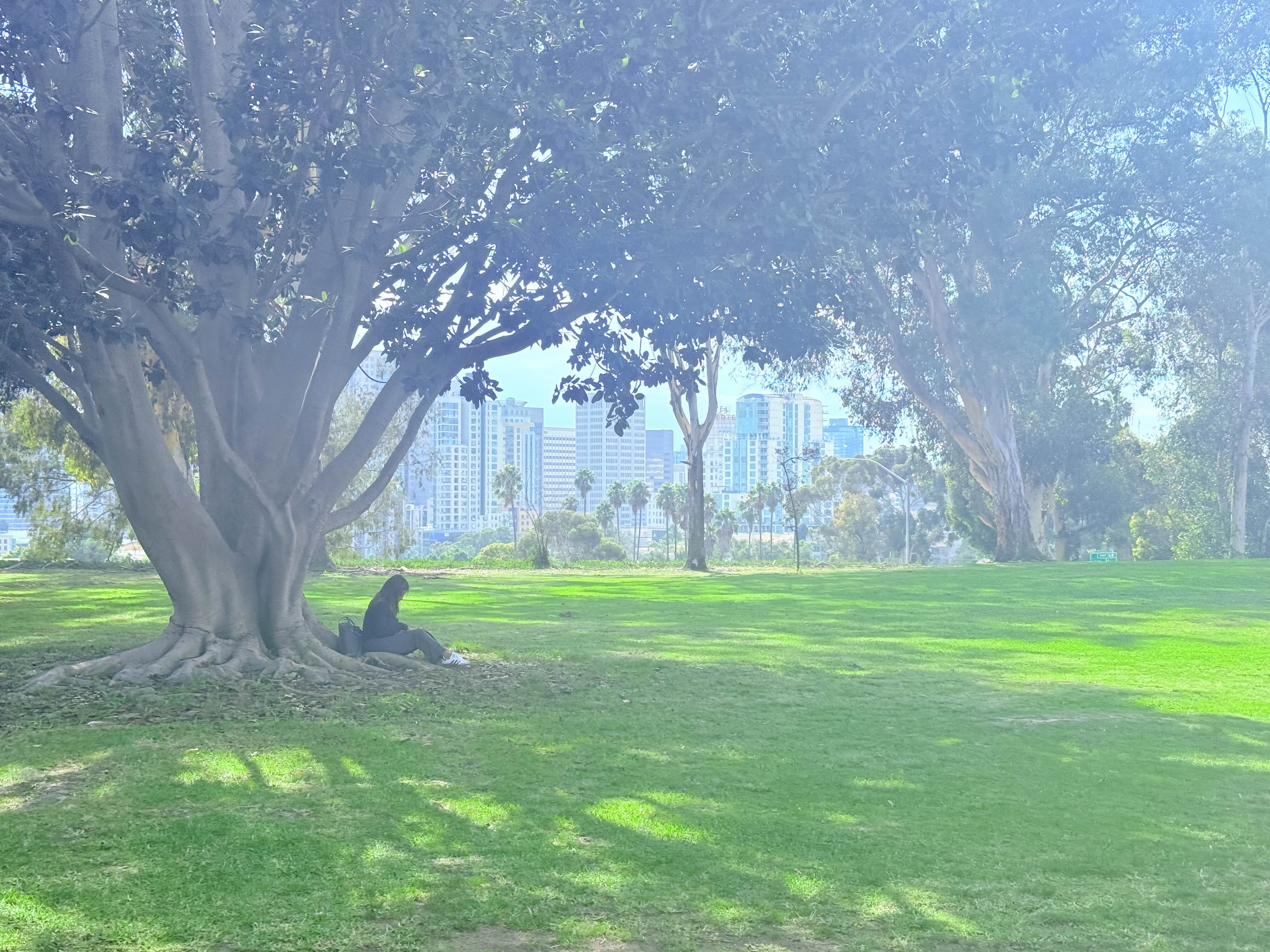
Balboa Park’s view of Downtown San Diego for Photography, 2024

Balboa Park is a primary attraction in San Diego and the region. Its many mature, and sometimes rare, trees and groves comprise an urban forest. Many of the original trees were planted by the American landscape architect, botanist, plantswoman, and gardener Kate Sessions. An early proponent of drought tolerant and California native plants in garden design, Sessions established a nursery to propagate and grow for the park and the public.

The park's gardens include Alcazar Garden, Botanical Building, Desert Cactus Garden, Casa del Rey Moro Garden, Inez Grant Parker Memorial Rose Garden, Japanese Friendship Garden, Bird Park, George W. Marston House and Gardens, Palm Canyon, and Zoro Garden.

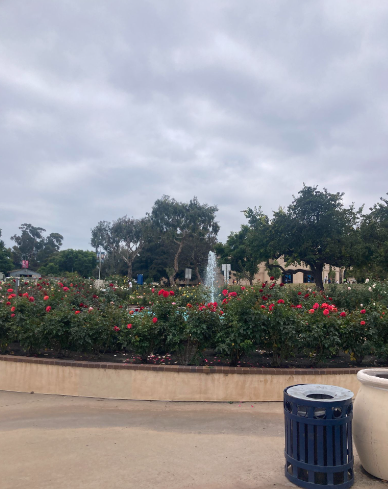
Inez Grant Parker Memorial Rose Garden overview

The main entrance to the park is via the Cabrillo Bridge and through the California Quadrangle. That entry is currently a two-lane road providing vehicle access to the park. A plan to divert vehicle traffic around to the south of the California Quadrangle to restore it as a pedestrian-only promenade was dropped after legal challenges, but was reapproved after the legal challenges failed and was scheduled for completion in 2019.

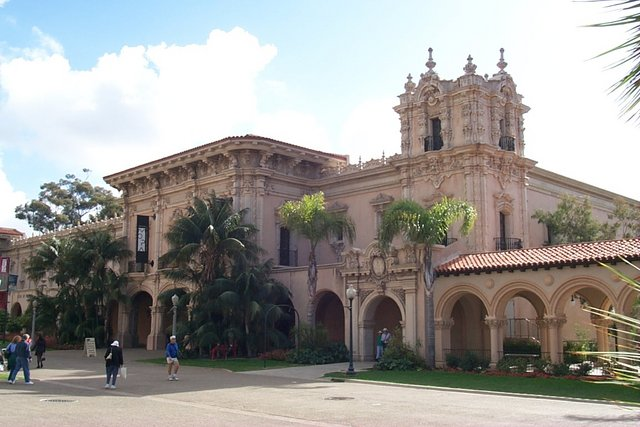
The 'Casa de Balboa' on El Prado

El Prado, a long, wide promenade and boulevard, runs through the park's center. Most of the buildings lining this street are in the Spanish Colonial Revival architecture style, a richly ornamented mixture of European Spanish architecture and the Spanish Colonial architecture of New Spain-Mexico. Along this boulevard are many of the park's museums and cultural attractions, including the Museum of Us, the San Diego Museum of Art, the Museum of Photographic Arts, the San Diego Art Institute, the San Diego Model Railroad Museum, the San Diego Natural History Museum, the San Diego History Center, the Reuben H. Fleet Science Center, and the Timken Museum of Art. Other features along El Prado include the Reflection Pond, the latticed Botanical Building, and the Bea Evenson Fountain. Next to the promenade are the San Diego Air & Space Museum and the San Diego Automotive Museum.

The California Bell Tower and Museum of Us

Theatrical and musical venues include the Spreckels Organ Pavilion, featuring one of the world's largest outdoor pipe organs; the Old Globe Theatre complex, which includes a replica of Shakespeare's Globe Theatre as well as an outdoor stage and a theatre in the round; and the Starlight Bowl – an outdoor amphitheatre. The Casa Del Prado Theater is the home of San Diego Junior Theatre, the country's oldest children's theatre program. The House of Pacific Relations International Cottages collected on El Prado offer free entertainment shows.

The Botanical Building, designed by Carleton Winslow, was the largest wood lath structure in the world when it was built in 1915 for the Panama-California Exposition. It contains large specimen palms and other plants and sits next to a long reflecting pool on the El Prado side.

Located in the eastern third of the park is Morley Field Sports Complex, which includes the Balboa Park Golf Complex, which contains a public 18-hole golf course and 9-hole executive course; the San Diego Velodrome; baseball and softball fields; cross country running course; the USTA-honored Balboa Tennis Club and tennis courts; archery ranges; the Bud Kearn public swimming pool; and a disc golf course.

Among the institutions and facilities within the park's borders but not administered by the city's Parks Department are the San Diego Zoo, the Naval Medical Center San Diego (NMCSD), and San Diego High School. Other attractions in various areas of the park include chess and bridge outdoor tables, horseshoe pits, playgrounds, walking and jogging trails, sports fields and courts, and picnic areas. Clubs and facilities for pétanque and lawn bowling are based in the park. There is also the Spanish Art Village which consists of art shops.

== History ==
=== Kumeyaay village and native Californian/Bajeño neighborhood ===
Before the establishment of the park, the area was home to a Kumeyaay village informally known as Hatam's Village (or Hata'am) in Florida Canyon just south of what is now Naval Medical Center San Diego. Its existence survived the 1852 effort to remove Kumeyaay villages within half a mile of the city. The village was kept active under Jośe Manuel Polton, also known as Hatam, who transformed the village into an urban Native American neighborhood for urbanized Native Californians and Baja Californians in San Diego seeking jobs. The neighborhood lasted into the 1890s through the advocacy of Hatam and his successor, Juan Gonzales before it was dismantled and became Balboa Park.

=== Land reserved ===
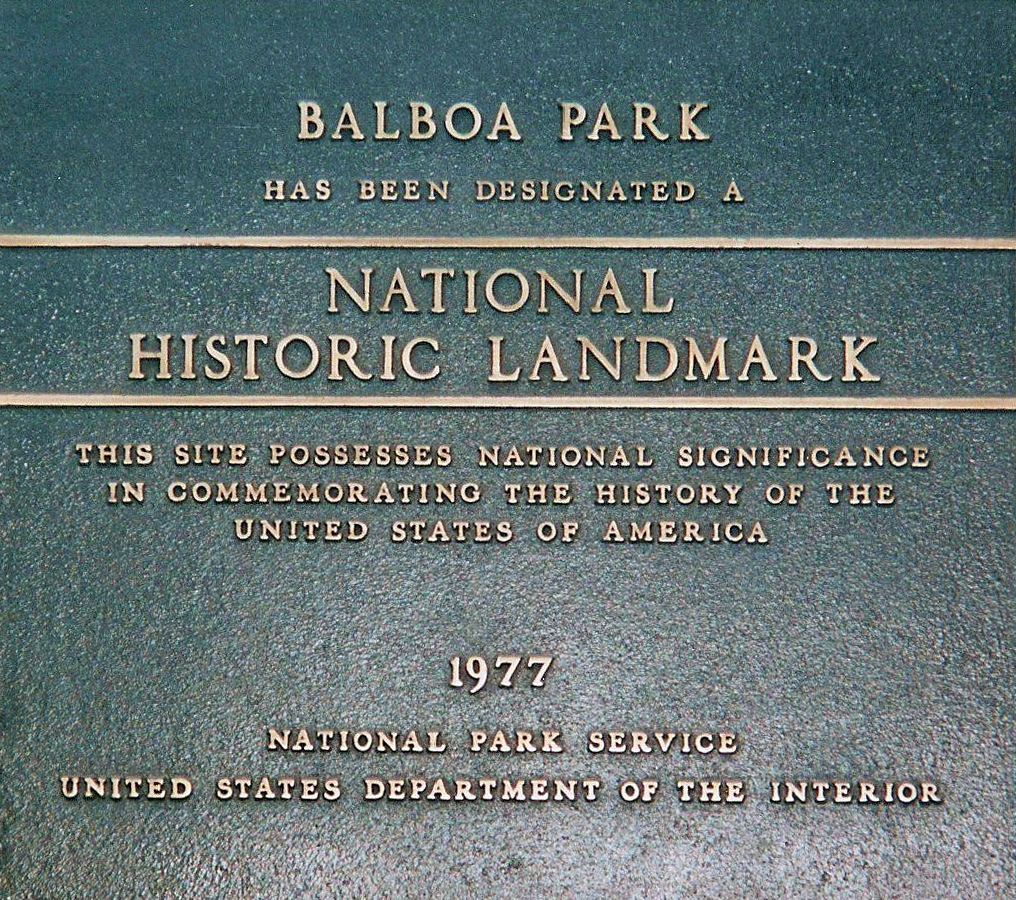
National Historic Landmark plaque for Balboa Park

Spain and later Mexico made a practice of setting aside large tracts of land for the common use of citizens. In 1835, the Alta California authorities set aside a 1,400-acre (570 ha) tract of pueblo land in San Diego to be used for the public's recreational purposes. This land included the site of present-day Balboa Park, making it one of the oldest places in the United States dedicated to public recreational usage.

No further activity took place until 1845 when a survey was done by Henry D. Fitch to map the 47,000 acres. Three years later, the Mexican government was forced by the Mexican–American War to cede Alta California, including San Diego, to the United States.

On February 15, 1868, the city's Board of Trustees was asked to create a public park out of two 160-acre (65 ha) plots of land just northeast of the growing urban center of "New Town"—present-day Downtown San Diego. The request was made by one of the Trustees, E. W. Morse, who had picked the site in coordination with real estate developer Alonzo Horton. There is a sculptural group of Horton, Marston, and Morse by Ruth Hayward in the park.

=== Park establishment ===
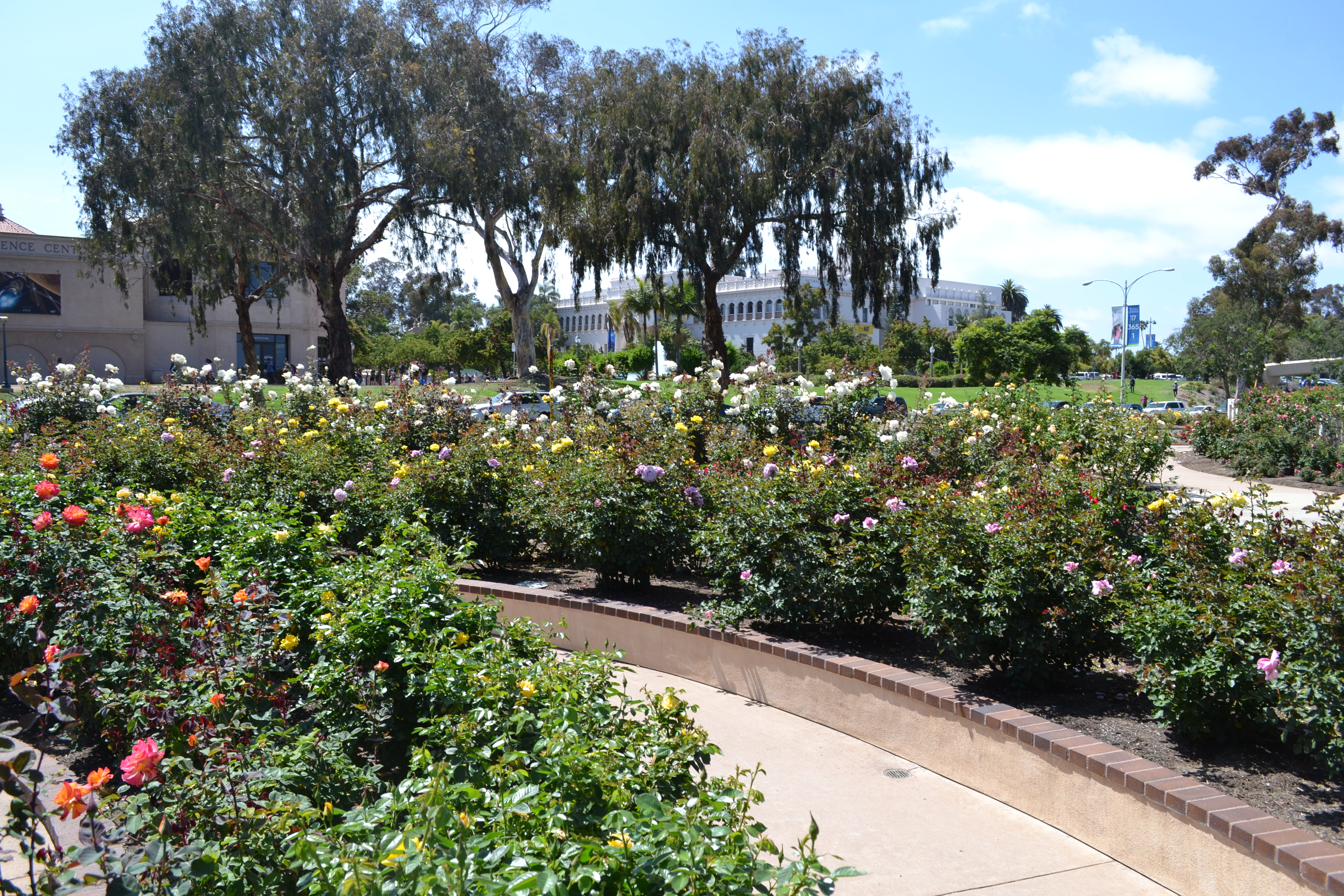
Inez Grant Parker Memorial Rose Garden, with the San Diego Natural History Museum in the background.

Subsequently, a resolution to set aside for a large city park not just two plots of land, but nine plots totaling 1,400 acres (570 ha), was approved by the city's Board of Trustees on May 26, 1868. Then in 1870, a new law called the "Act to Insure the Permanency of the Park Reservation", was passed by the state legislature, which said, "These lands (lots by number) are to be held in trust forever by the municipal authorities of said city for the purpose of a park".

It was around this time that San Diego residents were developing a fondness for the park, as illustrated by their insistence on keeping the park intact when in 1871 there was an attempt to overturn the state law to allow for the private purchase of some of the park land. At the urging of would-be land speculators and the city attorney, State Senator James McCoy quietly introduced a bill in the California state legislature to repeal the 1870 law. A San Diego resident learned of the plan and informed higher powers at the state level in Sacramento, California. The conspiracy was leaked to the press, exposing the city officials involved. A public safety committee was formed and collected signatures supporting the current existence of the park. Their plea was successful and the bill was killed in the legislature. San Diego was the second city in the U.S. to dedicate a large park after New York City's 1858 establishment of Central Park.

=== A City Park: 1872–1909 ===
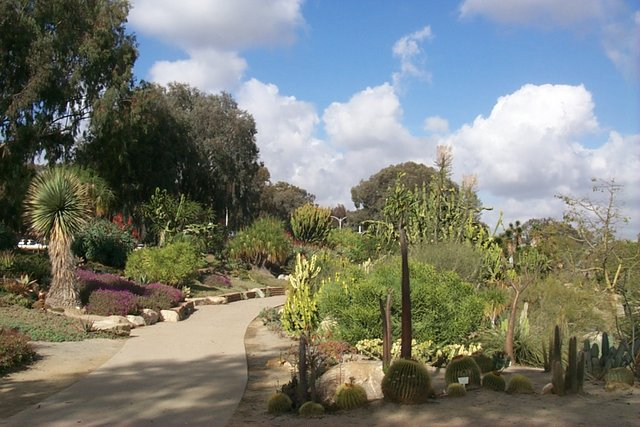
Desert Cactus Garden, Balboa Park

For the first few decades of its existence, "City Park" remained mostly open space. The land, lacking trees and covered in native wildflowers, was home to bobcats, rattlesnakes, coyotes, and other wildlife. Numerous proposals, some altruistic, some profit-driven, were brought forward for the development and use of the land during this time, but no comprehensive plan for development was adopted until 1902.

Nevertheless, some buildings were constructed, including an orphanage and women's shelter (later burned down), a high school (Russ High School – later San Diego High School), and several gardens maintained by various private groups. One of the most celebrated of these early usages was a 36-acre nursery owned and maintained by local horticulturist and botanist Kate Sessions, who is often referred to as "the mother of Balboa Park." Although owned by Sessions, by agreement with the city the nursery was open to the public, and Sessions donated trees and plants to the city every year for its beautification. Sessions is responsible for bringing in many of the different varieties of native and exotic plants in the park. Her work was so progressive that she was in fact the first woman awarded the Meyer Medal for "foreign plant importation" by the American Genetic Association.

Other developments from this time include two reservoirs, an animal pound in Pound Canyon (later renamed Cabrillo Canyon), and a gunpowder magazine in the area now known as Florida Canyon. The earliest recreational developments in the park were in the "Golden Hill Park" area off 25th Street. The National Register-listed the rustic stone fountain designed by architect Henry Lord Gay as the oldest surviving designed feature in the park. Other attractions in the area included a children's park, walking trails, and a redwood bird aviary.

Indigenous Californians and Bajenos began to flock to the Kumeyaay village in Florida Canyon looking for work in San Diego during this period. A Native Californian urban exclave was built up in the canyon, which lasted up until the 1900s when the neighborhood was torn down in preparation for the Panama–California Exposition.

=== Preparation for the 1915 Expo: 1910–1914 ===
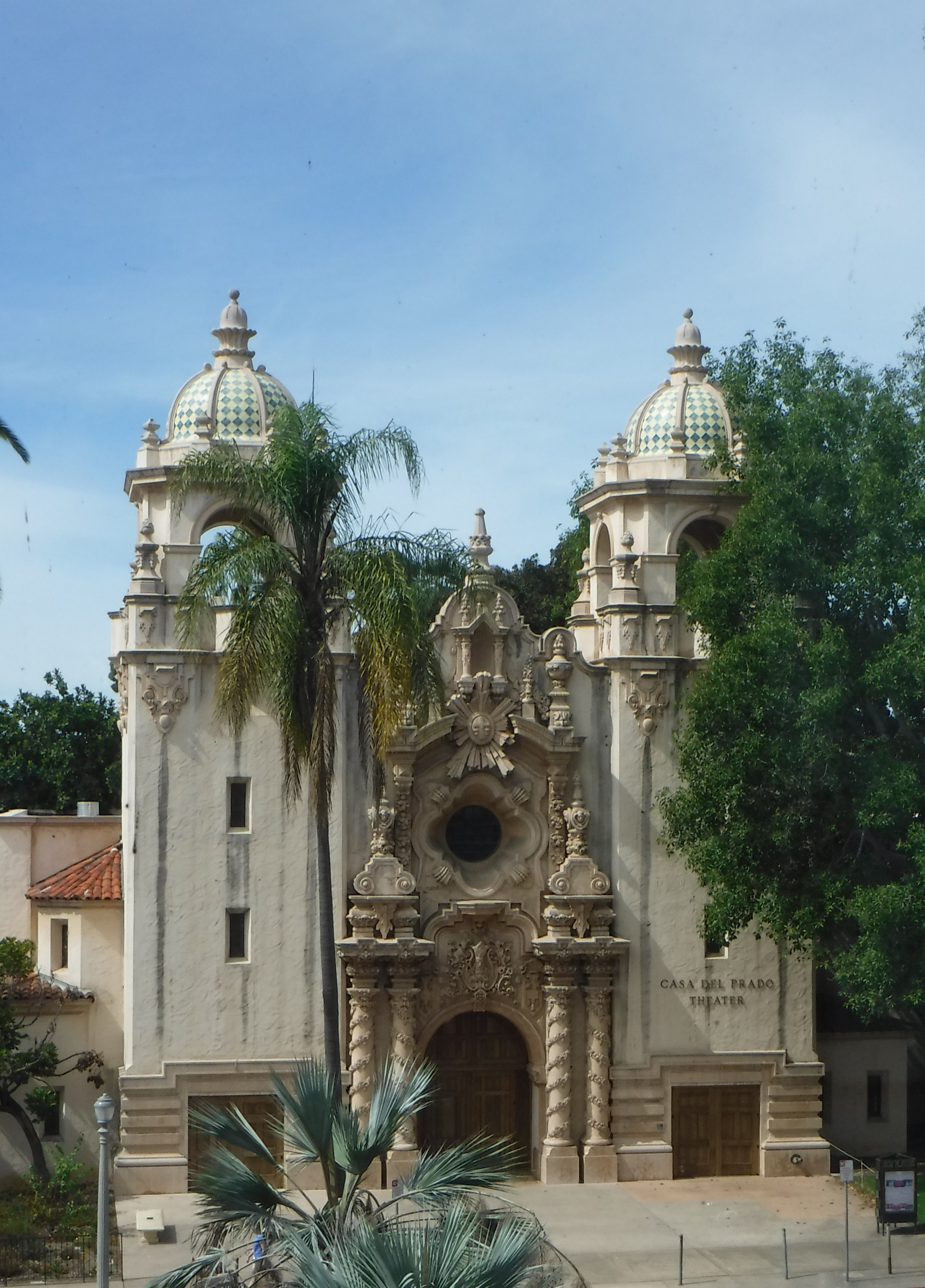
The Casa del Prado Theater, with Churrigueresque ornamentation framing the entrance

Preparations for the 1915 Panama–California Exposition created much of the park's present-day look-and-feel and designed amenities.

Beginning in 1909, San Diego Chamber of Commerce president G. Aubrey Davidson suggested that the park hold an expo to coincide with the 1915 opening of the Panama Canal. Davidson believed an expo would help improve commerce (it would advertise that San Diego was the first U.S. port of call vessels encountered after passing through the canal and sailing north), build the city's population, and expand the infrastructure of the park. He later explained the significance of holding the expo in San Diego:

"I felt something must be done to get our city on the map and advertise it to the rest of the world. I knew we had something here that no other city had, and that all that was necessary was for the people to know about it."

It has been long debated as to how Balboa Park’s name changed from City Park to Balboa Park. The most popular theory states that in order to prepare for the 1915 Panama-California Exposition, city officials held a contest for a name change in 1910 with the name “Balboa” becoming the reigning champion. The second theory made by Nancy Carol Carter, historian and former director of the Legal Research Center at USD states that this theory is false. Through her research, she discovered that the naming of the park was a four month long effort from the parks commissioners. In October 1910 during a meeting, the commissioners decided on the name Balboa.

San Diego would be the smallest city to ever hold a World's Fair; its population at the time was less than 40,000. The expo was organized by a group of San Diego business leaders, including Ulysses S. Grant Jr., and was funded at an initial cost of $5 million (including $1 million from voter-approved bonds for landscaping). Developer and civic leader D. C. Collier was chosen as General Director of the expo; he made major decisions such as locating the expo on the park's central mesa, using California Mission Revival Style architecture for the buildings, and featuring "human progress" as the theme. A similar fair, the 1915 Panama–Pacific International Exposition, was also planned in "far to the north" San Francisco to celebrate the canal opening. Although $5 million had been set aside by Congress for celebrations of the Panama Canal opening, the majority of the funds went to the San Francisco expo.

In anticipation of the exposition, many of San Diego's business and city leaders began to develop separate plans for the park. John D. Spreckels, owner of the San Diego Electric Railway, wanted to shift the location of the main public plaza to add room for exhibitors — and to allow his streetcar system to traverse the park and extend to the North Park and University Heights neighborhoods.

The Exposition's lead designer and site planner was architect Bertram Goodhue, well known for his Gothic Revival style churches in New York and Boston, who sought a regionally appropriate aesthetic to use in Southern California. Goodhue and associate architect Carleton Winslow chose to use the styles of highly ornamented Spanish Baroque architecture with the Spanish Colonial architecture created during the Spanish colonization era in New Spain-Mexico and the lower Americas, with Churrigueresque and Plateresque detailing "updating" the already popular Mission Revival style—to create the Spanish Colonial Revival style.

The buildings and the style were extremely well received by the public and design professionals in California and nationally, becoming a reigning style for decades, and still the primary vernacular style in much of California. Goodhue's associate architect was Carleton M. Winslow, who is solely credited with the lattice work Botanical Building and other structures. Goodhue's team, which included Kate Sessions and Lloyd Wright for landscape design, had won out over the local and more modernist Irving Gill to get the commission. One of the most significant improvements to the park from that time was the construction of the Cabrillo Bridge across a major canyon in the city. The bridge connects the main portion of the park with the western portion and with Laurel Street.

A lavish groundbreaking ceremony for the fair's construction was held in July 1911.

=== The Panama–California Exposition: 1915–1916 ===
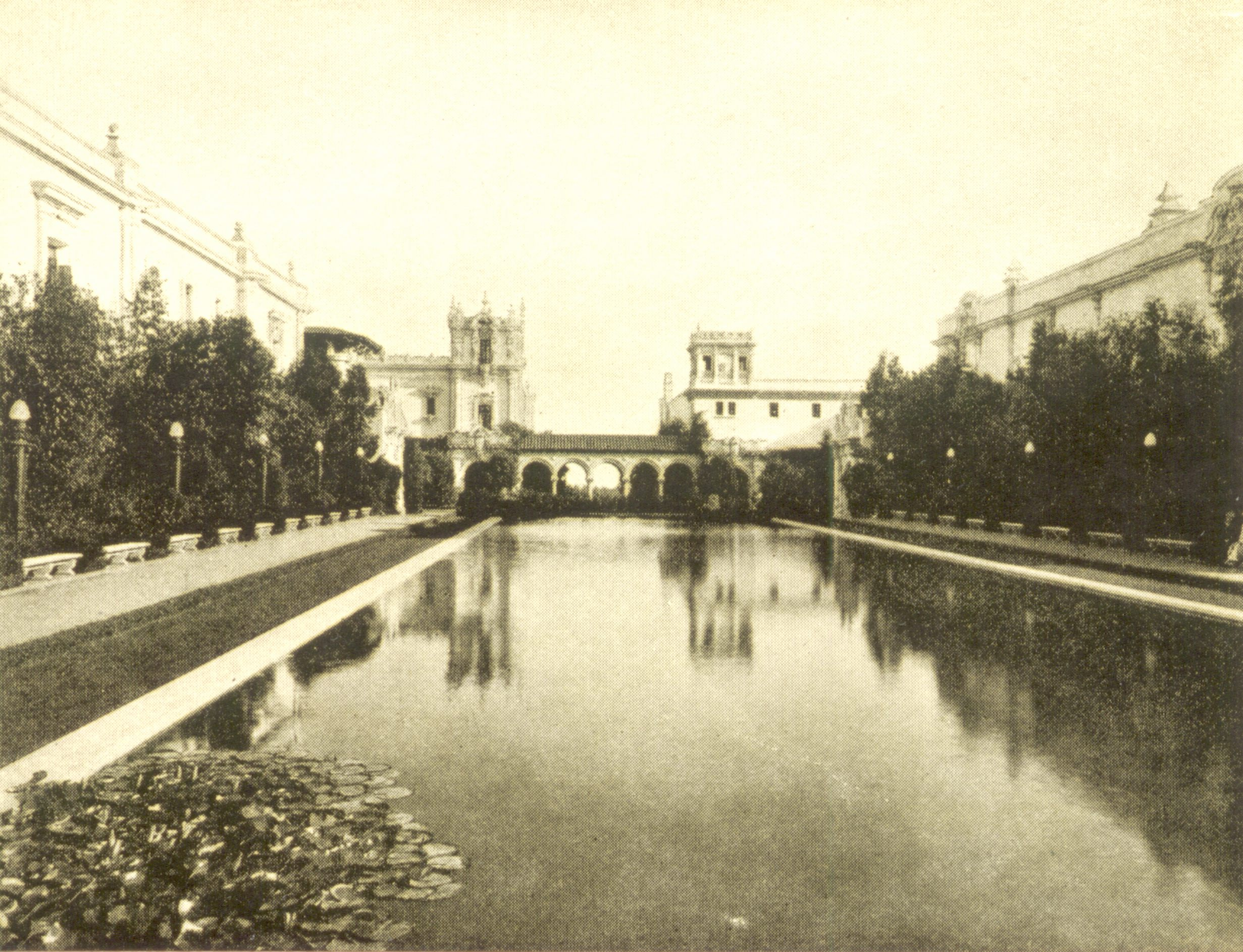
La Laguna de las Flores (present day reflection pool) at the 1915 Panama–California Exposition

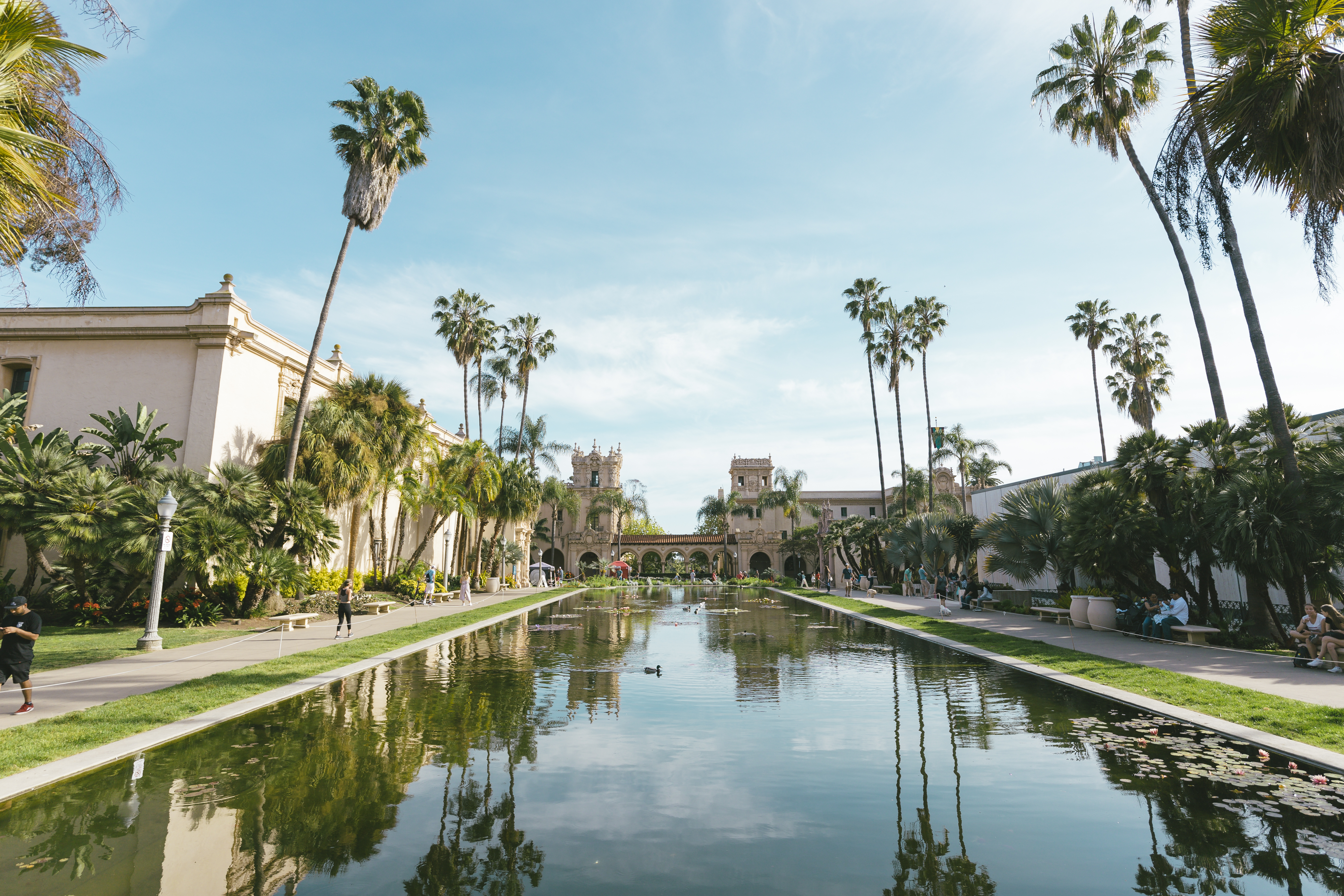
Lily Pond (reflection pool), Balboa Park in 2019

On December 31, 1914, the Panama–California Exposition opened, with Balboa Park "crammed full" of spectators. President Woodrow Wilson pushed a telegraph button in Washington, D.C., to symbolically open the ceremonies by turning on the power at the park. Yellow and red were the themed colors of the event and were displayed throughout. All of the employees, workers, security people, and management staff were dressed in period Spanish and Mexican military uniforms and much of the park was filled with plantings of exotic plants. Over 40,000 red Poinsettia plants, all in full bloom, were used. The event attracted the national attention organizers had sought. Even Pennsylvania's Liberty Bell made a brief three-day appearance in November 1915. The event was such a success the fair was extended through 1916. Over the two years, it drew more than 3.7 million visitors, including Henry Ford, William Jennings Bryan, Thomas Edison, Theodore Roosevelt, and William Howard Taft. The expo actually turned a slight profit, which was donated to the San Diego Museum in the park.

Roosevelt, approving of the buildings' architecture, recommended that the "buildings of rare phenomenal taste and beauty" be left as permanent additions. The majority of the buildings were only supposed to remain standing through 1916 and were not constructed with long-lasting materials. When the expo ended, several city discussions were held to determine what to do with the buildings. Goodhue recommended demolishing the buildings, saying "They are now crumbling, disintegrating and altogether unlovely structures, structures that lack any of the venerability of age and present only its pathos, and the space they occupy could readily be made into one of the most beautiful public gardens in the New World." Joseph W. Sefton Jr., president of the Society of Natural History, also called for their demolition, citing fire hazards: "All those old exposition buildings are nothing but fire traps. ... They are pretty to look at, but we may wake up any morning and find them gone, and our million dollars['] worth of exhibits with them." However, a city-appointed committee hired an architect to review the buildings, and he determined that they could be restored by a slight margin over any costs to demolish the buildings. The necessary funds and materials for restoration were donated by San Diegans and the labor was financed by the federal government. Some of the buildings and infrastructure constructed for the Panama–California Exposition that still exist include:

- Cabrillo Bridge (completed April 12, 1914)
- California State Building and Quadrangle (completed October 2, 1914 – now the Museum of Us)
- Administration Building (completed March 1912 – now: offices of the Museum of Us)
- Botanical Building
- California Bell Tower (completed 1914)
- New Mexico Building (now: Balboa Park Club)
- Spreckels Organ Pavilion (dedicated December 31, 1914)

=== California Pacific International Exposition: 1935–1936 ===
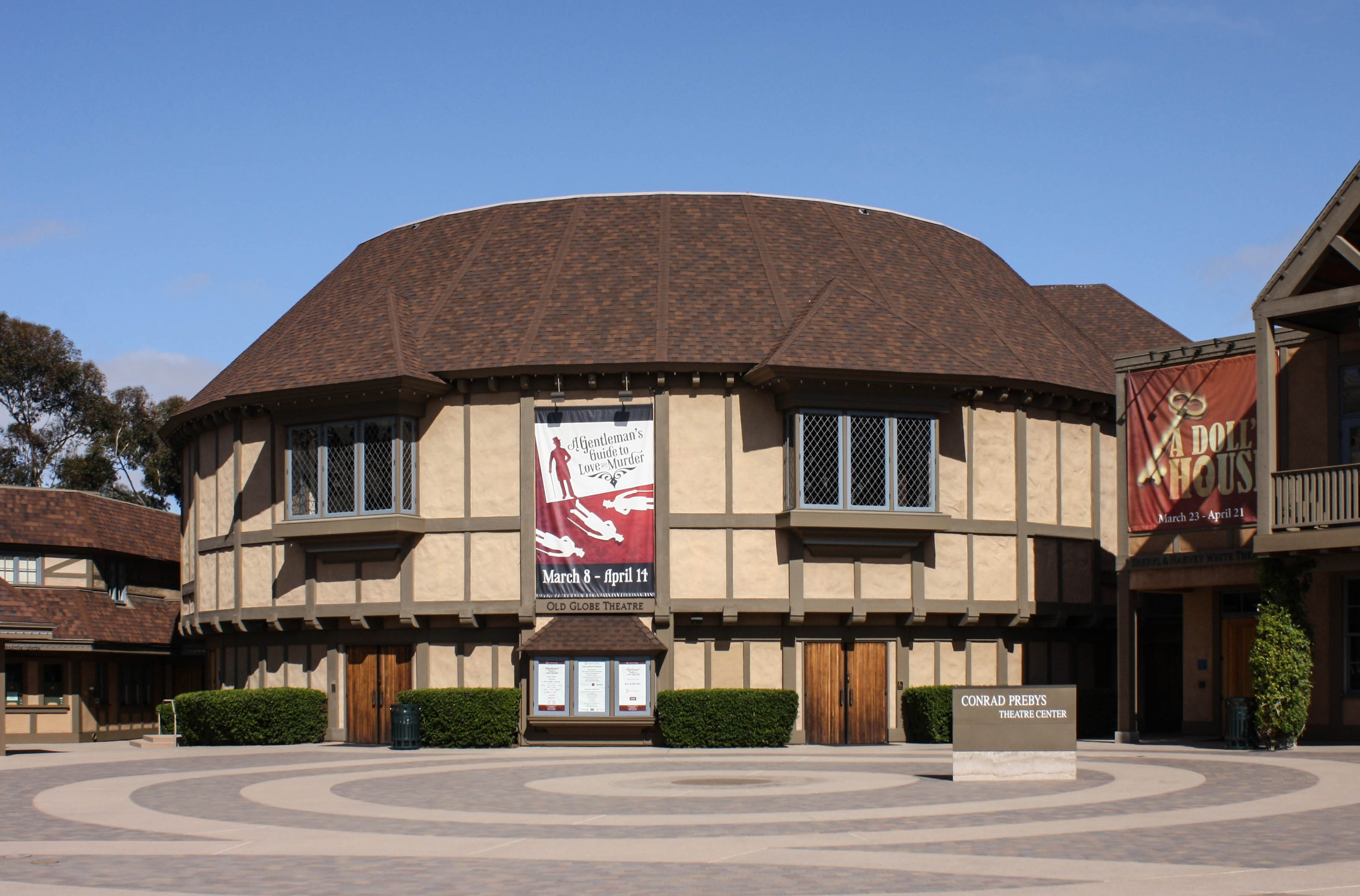
Old Globe Theatre

Balboa Park's second big event, the California Pacific International Exposition, came in 1935. This Exposition was intended to promote the city and remedy San Diego's Great Depression ills. Balboa Park was reconfigured by San Diego architect Richard S. Requa, who also oversaw the design and construction of many new buildings, some to be permanent. Facilities added at that time and still in use include the Old Globe Theatre, the International Cottages, and the Spanish Village.

The 1935 Exposition left behind colorful stories of its exhibits and entertainments. The Gold Gulch was a forerunner of the many "frontier town" themed areas of later amusement parks. The controversial Zoro Garden Nudist Colony, "Midget Village", and sideshow entertainments including fan dancer Sally Rand added to the lore. The Exposition also provided visitors with early glimpses of 'Alpha', a walking silver robot; and a strange new electrical device called a "television".

Like the first exposition, the 1935 Fair was so successful it was extended for a second year. Opening ceremonies for the second season began when President Franklin D. Roosevelt pressed a gold telegraph key in the White House to turn on the exposition's lights. He later visited the exposition; other notable guests included Herbert Hoover, Mae West, and Jack Dempsey. Funded at $20 million, the 1935–1936 event counted 6.7 million visitors—almost double the total of the 1915–16 exposition.

At the conclusion of the expo, San Diegans voted again on what to do with the park and its buildings. Banker Joseph Sefton Jr. called for the buildings' removal, "They are hideous and badly placed. Had we torn out the 1915 exposition buildings and landscaped the park we would have a beautiful place there now and not a long row of ramshackle firetraps." Several proposals were developed for converting buildings to museums and several groups attempted to have some of the park land sold to finance other projects.

=== World wars ===
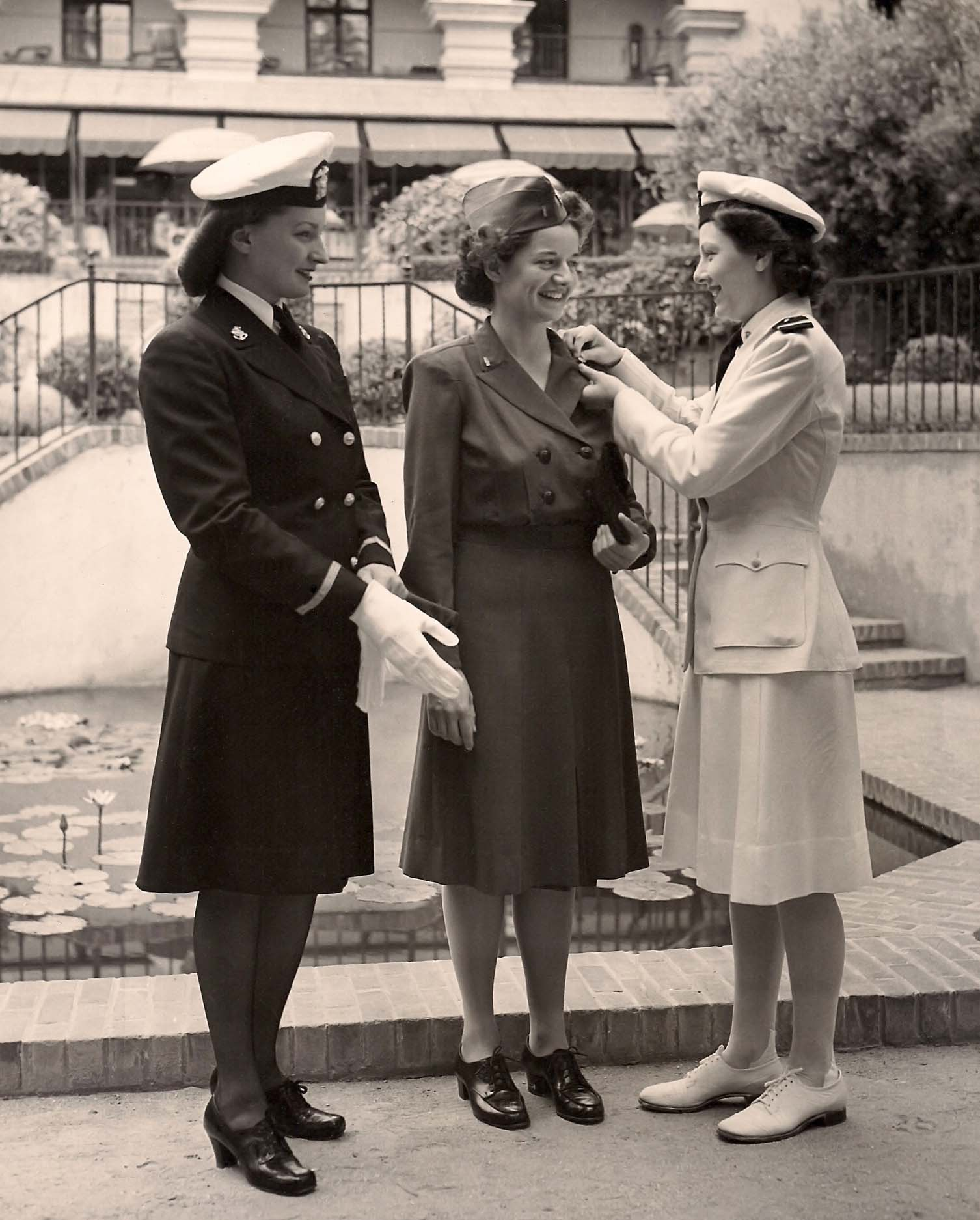
Navy Nurse quarters, House of Hospitality, Balboa Park 1944

During both the Great War and World War II, the park was handed over to the Department of the Navy to be used as a barracks and training ground and was an extension of Naval Medical Center San Diego. By 1917, after $30,000 in repairs and modifications were made to the original buildings, over 5,000 U.S. troops were using the park for training.

Coinciding with the Panama–California Exposition, the Commandant of the Marine Corps instructed 2nd Battalion of the newly established 4th Marines to represent the Marine Corps at the event. On December 19, 1914, Marine Barracks, Balboa Park, was established as the second, and during its period, and only Marine base in San Diego. It was established by Marines under the command of Colonel Pendleton. It remained in place until 1921, when a more permanent base was established in Dutch Flats, itself a predecessor of Marine Corps Recruit Depot San Diego. Under the conditions of usage, upon closing, the Marine Corps returned the buildings they had used in the exact condition that they had received them. Although some buildings were scheduled to be demolished due to disrepair, several San Diego groups organized to ensure the buildings were kept. Donated funds allowed for improvements to the buildings' integrity and interiors.

During World War II, the park was renamed Camp Kidd, after Rear Admiral Isaac Kidd. Buildings within the park were used for multiple purposes, including hospital wards, training facilities, and barracks. After the attack on Pearl Harbor, many of the wounded were transported to Camp Kidd's hospital wards. Camp Kidd also served as a Reception Center for sailors until 1944, when those activities were transferred to Camp Elliott; this allowed for additional hospital expansion. It was returned to civilian authority in 1946, and repair costs to return the buildings and infrastructure to their pre-war status totaled $840,000, with the majority reimbursed by the Navy. In 1948, the funds were used to restore seven buildings that were deemed unsafe.

=== Post-war 20th century ===
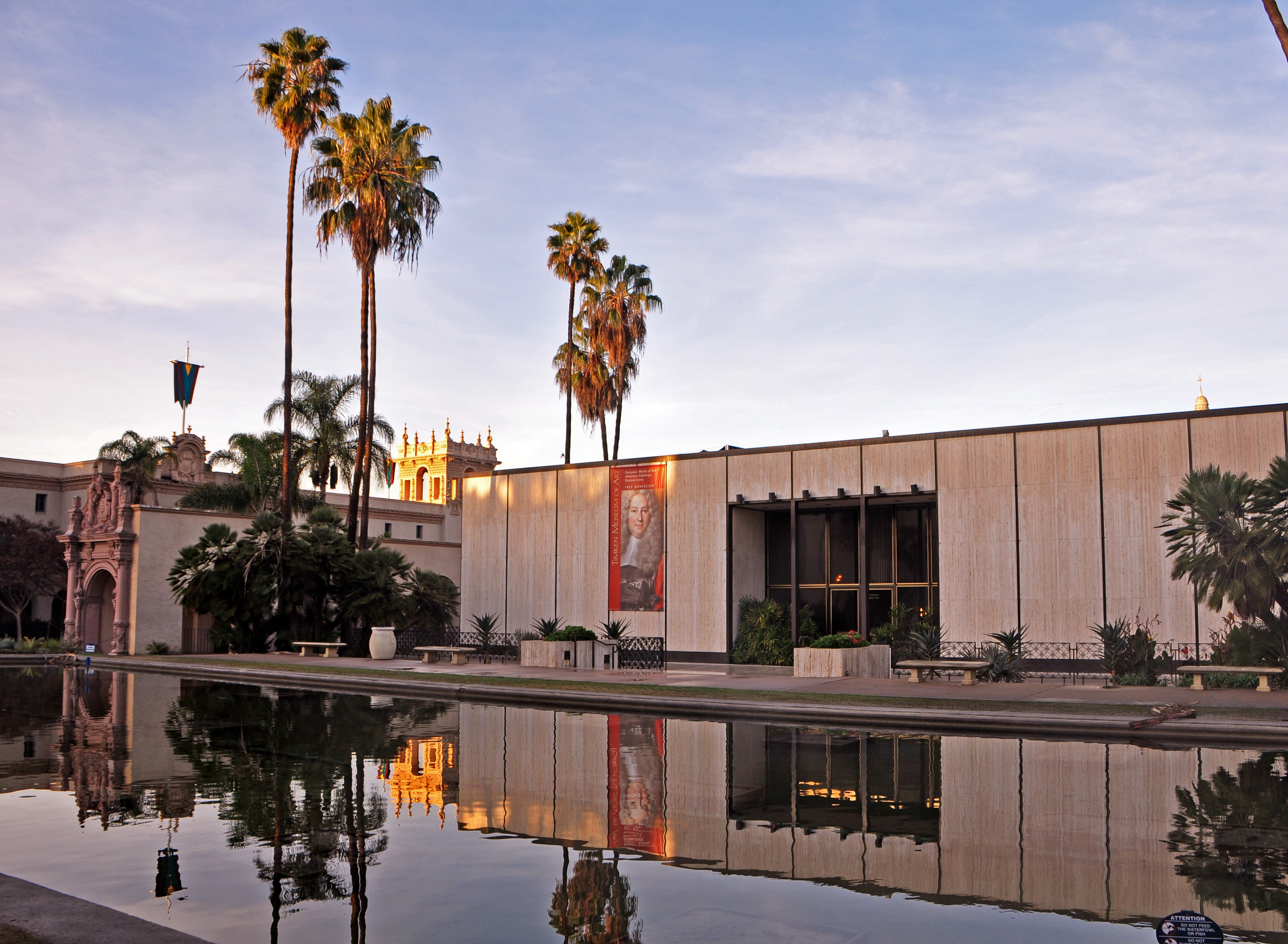
Timken Museum of Art opened in 1965.

A new addition to the park during the post-war 1940s was the carillon in the California Tower (1946), which chimes the time every quarter-hour. The San Diego Junior Theater, a program of the Old Globe Theatre, was established in 1948, performing in the Prado Theatre. The amphitheater formerly known as the Ford Bowl became the Starlight Bowl, home of the Starlight Musical Theater (also known as the San Diego Civic Light Opera and as Starlight Opera), which performed Broadway musicals outdoors in the summer.

In 1959, the city hired an architectural firm to map out a plan for the park based on the suggestions of San Diegans along with the firm's recommendations. The initial review called for 13 of the original 1915 buildings to remain while replacing 11 others with new buildings in their place. The plan also called for adjusted roadways, additional landscaping, and improvements in parking. By 1967, the city and private charities such as the Committee of 100 undertook a major effort to restore the park's historic buildings. Most of the original Exposition buildings were continuing to deteriorate with some lacking foundations and minimal structural support. By the 1990s some of the Prado buildings were deteriorating so badly that "pieces of plaster regularly fell off the walls." Several crumbling buildings were torn down and replaced with permanent structures which were carefully detailed to maintain the original appearance. The Science and Education Building and the Home Economy Building were demolished to make room for the expansion of two new wings for the Timken Museum of Art. The loss of these two buildings along with the Casa de Balboa, the House of Charm, and the House of Hospitality, resulted in the formation of the independent organization, Committee of One Hundred, to attempt to preserve the exhibition buildings.

Several new museums opened during the 1960s and 1970s: the Timken Museum of Art in 1965, the Centro Cultural de la Raza in 1970, and the Reuben H. Fleet Science Center in 1973. The 1915–1916 exposition's Food and Beverage Building was rebuilt and reopened in 1971 as Casa del Prado.

Balboa Park, and the historic Exposition buildings, were declared a National Historic Landmark and National Historic Landmark District in 1977, and placed on the National Register of Historic Places. The following year two historic park structures burned down in two separate arson fires: the Aerospace Museum in the former Electric Building, and the 1935 Old Globe Theatre. The Aerospace Museum (now the San Diego Air & Space Museum) lost over $4 million in exhibits, and was reopened after moving into the old Ford Building. The Old Globe Theatre produced its 1978 season on a temporary outdoor stage, which was later upgraded to become one of the Globe's three theaters. The Old Globe Theatre itself was rebuilt and reopened in 1981. Queen Elizabeth II presented at the dedication ceremony for the theatre in 1983.

Throughout the 1980s, there were multiple reports throughout Balboa Park of vandalism, murder, rape, arson, and minor petty crimes. The resulting negative publicity during this period inspired Bruce Springsteen to write a song entitled "Balboa Park" focusing on the unpleasant aspects of the park. One of the Old Globe Theatre's starring actors was stabbed to death in the middle of the day in February 1985. A 36-year-old woman was gang-raped and murdered in the park in June 1986. To counter the increase in crime, city officials expanded police patrols in the park, and many of the individual museums hired security guards. After two murders in 1993 and the shooting of a young drama student walking across the Cabrillo Bridge in 1994, nighttime lighting in the park was increased, and video cameras were installed in several locations to allow park rangers and police to better monitor the area.

In 1998, the Reuben H. Fleet Science Center opened a larger building at its present location. The following year, the Hall of Champions Sports Museum moved to the old Federal Building.

=== 21st century ===
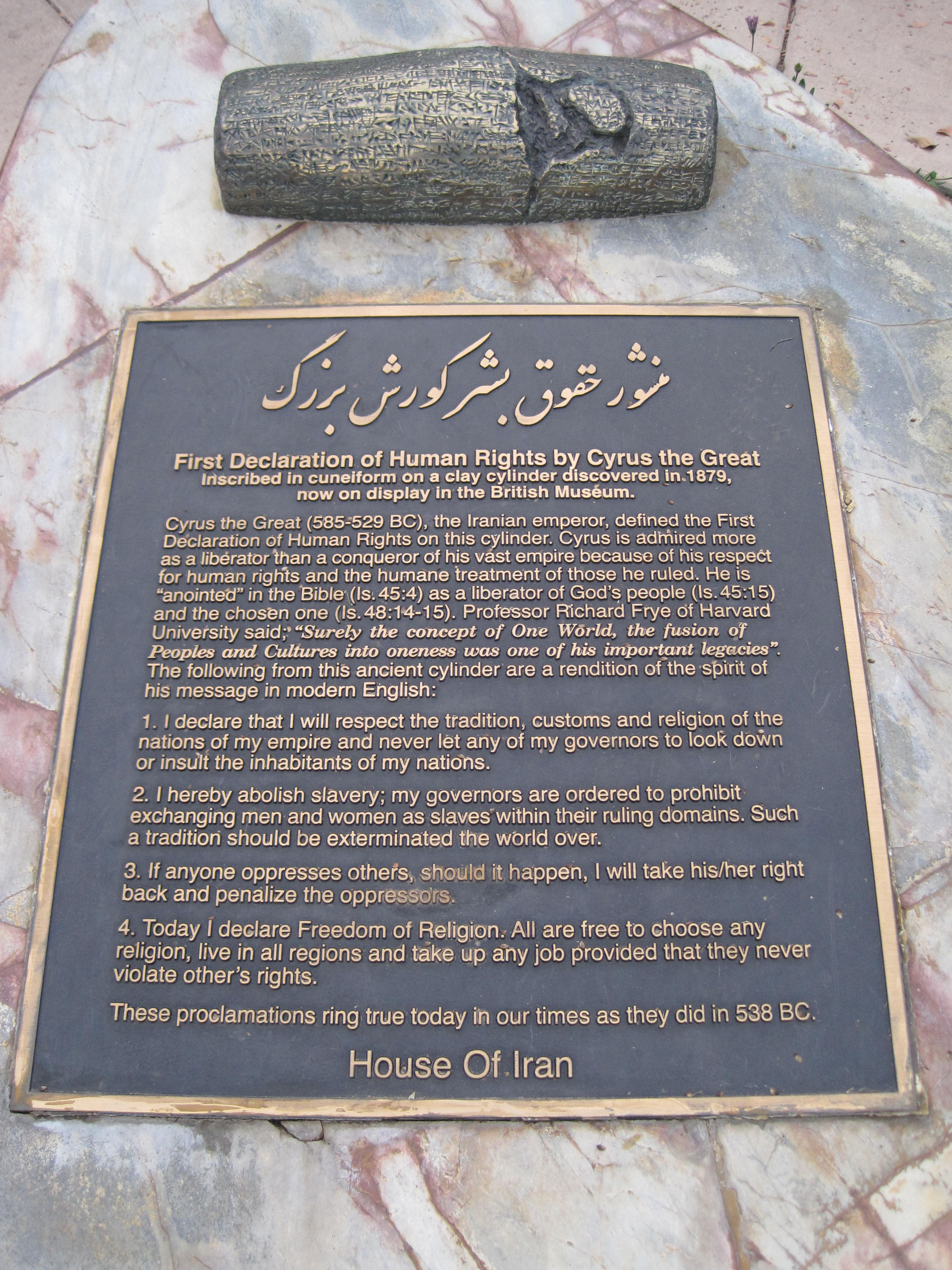
A plaque at the House of Pacific Relations states to be a transcript of a human rights declaration by Cyrus the Great. However, the text is not accurate, and contains elements not in the original Cyrus Cylinder, such as a general abolition of slavery.

By 2001, over 12 million people visited the park each year.

The Balboa Park Conservancy, a non-profit group to preserve and promote the park, was proposed in 2009 and was officially launched on September 14, 2010.

On the night between August 11 and 12, 2012, the 100-year-old Lily Pond at Balboa Park was vandalized overnight. Officials said the water level in the pond was reduced to 2 inches and a pipe was broken. No fish or turtles were killed, but damage to the pond and surrounding landscaping was estimated at several thousand dollars. There had been reports of a "midnight water gun fight" planned for that night, and a video of such an event was later uploaded to YouTube. In early 2013, work began on repairing the Lily Pond, including removing the fish and plants to temporary homes, draining the pond, and repairing the concrete lining. In addition, plumbing repairs were completed, and 27 new plant platforms were constructed to hold the lilies in place. After the reservoir was filled with water and the fish were re-introduced, the Lily Pond opened once again to the public in late February, 2013.

In 2017, the State of California designated Balboa Park as a California Cultural District, given its central role in the culture of San Diego.

==== Centennial ====
As the centennial of the 1915 exposition approached, there was talk of a grand year-long celebration "on the scale of the 1915 and 1935 fairs". A nonprofit organization, Balboa Park Celebration Inc., was formed in 2011 to organize the festivities and "reintroduce Balboa Park to the world." However, fundraising faltered and plans failed to materialize. In March 2014 the nonprofit organization disbanded, turning over its records and responsibilities to the city less than a year before the celebrations were supposed to start. Mayor Kevin Faulconer and City Council President Todd Gloria, who had been major proponents of a large-scale celebration, expressed disappointment with the group's "lack of significant progress achieving its goals" and said they would work together to "move forward with a more practical and realistic celebration." A City Council committee ordered an audit of the organization's finances to find out what became of the $2.8 million in public funds allocated to it by the council.

The 2015 "Celebration" of the Centennial became a grassroots movement with all the Parks's institutions celebrating with special exhibits and events. On Dec. 31 Carol Williams, with special guests, ushered in the year with an evening of music at the Spreckels Organ Pavilion. On Saturday, May 9, The Garden Party of the Century invited Garden enthusiasts from throughout the county to come enjoy the park. A floral wagon parade highlighted the event.

For the Centennial the Park's Department working together with Friends of Balboa Park created an Adopt-a-Plot program. Throughout the park various volunteer organizations have adopted garden areas and have started a transformation to enhance the park's beauty for the next 100 years.

In 2016, the Electriquettes returned to Balboa Park. They had been planned for the Centenniel celebration and several were on display in 1915, but it took until the Spring of 2016 for them to return to be driven on the Prado. They are electric-powered wicker carts which can be rented and driven in the main Prado area of the park.

In 2017, it was announced that San Diego Comic-Con would be opening a museum in the park, displacing the San Diego Hall of Champions, which will move to Petco Park.

==== Traffic rerouting and parking changes ====
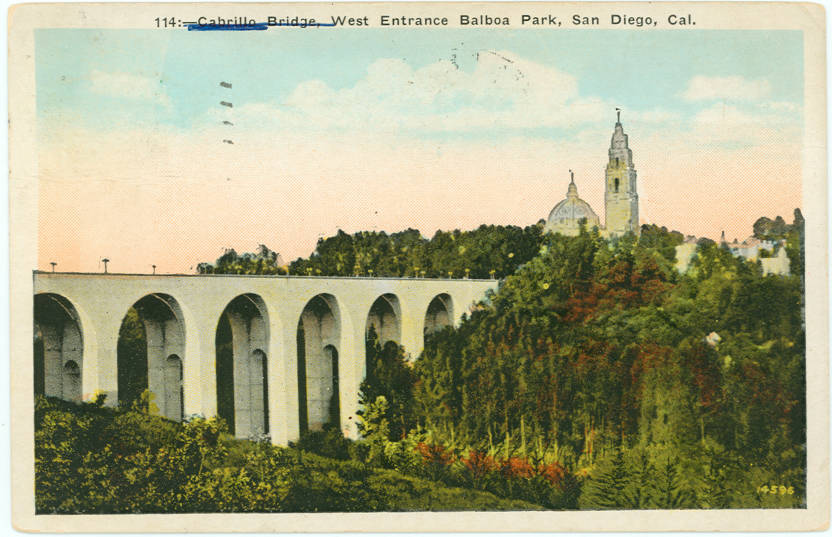
Cabrillo Bridge West Entrance, Balboa Park, 1924

In August 2010 a proposal was unveiled by then-Mayor Jerry Sanders and philanthropist Irwin M. Jacobs to divert traffic away from the central Prado areas of the park, such as the Plaza de Panama in front of the Art Museum and the California Quadrangle in front of the Museum of Us, and restore the areas to pedestrian use. The plan would provide replacement parking via a two-level parking garage at the site of the current Spreckles Organ Pavilion parking lot. The plan also called for changes in access to the park via the Cabrillo Bridge. The bridge would become eastbound only so that people could enter the park via the Cabrillo Bridge but could exit only via Park Boulevard. Inbound traffic would be deflected via a new bridge offramp through the current Alcazar Gardens parking lot toward the new parking garage. The Alcazar Gardens parking lot would be for disabled parking only and for loading and unloading of passengers. The new parking garage would house 750–900 cars and would be landscaped on top. The plan became controversial because of its alteration to the appearance of the bridge and the possibility of charging for parking in the parking garage. In July 2012 the City Council voted to proceed with the Jacobs plan. Construction was due to begin in October 2012 and be completed in time for the park's centennial in 2015. However, the scheduled start of construction was pushed back to February 2013 due to a legal challenge from the Save Our Heritage Organisation (SOHO). In February 2013 a judge voided the project, after which Jacobs withdrew his offer to finance it. Since the Park's master plan already called for removing the 67-space parking lot from the Plaza de Panama, the city went ahead with that portion of the proposal removing all parking from the plaza and converting it into a pedestrian area with tree planters, seats, and tables.

Eventually the courts ruled against the challengers and in 2016 the City Council re-approved the project with its original cost estimate of $45 million now expanded to $79 million. The project will remove all traffic from the Plaza de Panama and the California Quadrangle, diverting it toward a 3-level underground parking garage with a rooftop garden and 797 paid parking spaces. All other parking in Balboa Park will remain free. The cost of the project will be divided between the city, which plans to use the parking lot as a revenue source, and private philanthropy. The proposed completion date is July 2019.

In December 2016, opponents of the traffic redirect and its associated 'bypass bridge' sued to stop it from moving forward on the grounds that it would fundamentally change the historic monument. City Attorney Mara Elliot called this an "unjustified attempt" to delay the project, but SOHO claimed it would have adverse effects on the park and its historic integrity.

Vehicles at Balboa Park

In April 2024, the northbound 163 highway had many of their lanes closed for maintenance. The closure was in effect from 3 a.m. to noon. People who were using this highway to Balboa park were impacted by the closure and had to find another route.

In January of 2026, Mayor Todd Gloria and the San Diego City council enforces a new rule, requiring paid parking. Since enforcing this rule, the city has seen attendance rates have gone down significantly by 34%. Some institutions predict that 10 million dollars will be lost in revenue from lack of attendance.

== Special events ==
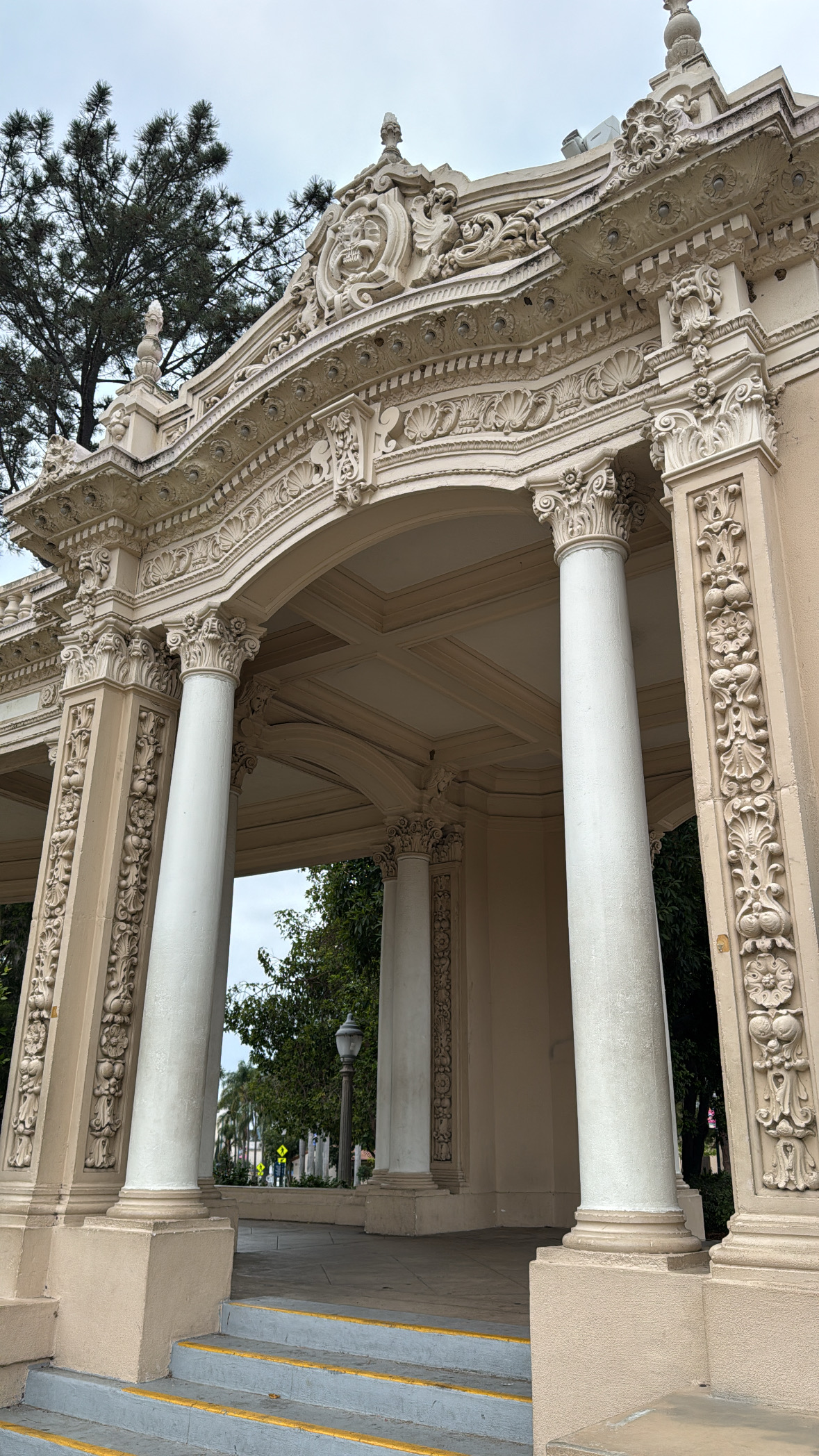
A segment of the Spreckels Organ Pavilion at Balboa Park, 2024.

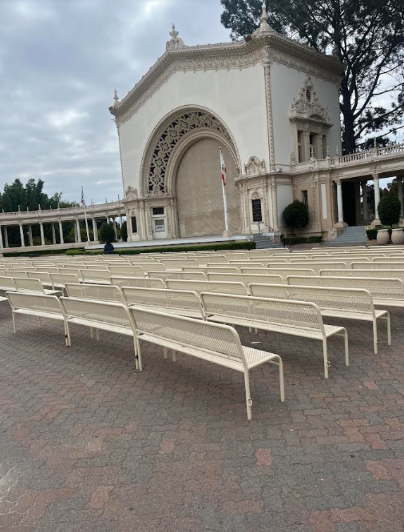
Photo of Spreckels Organ Pavilion, Balboa Park.

Balboa Park frequently holds events throughout its museums, venues, and plazas. These events include free weekly concerts at the Spreckles Organ Pavilion each Sunday at 2:00 p.m., guest speakers, and annual parades, cultural festivals, and fairs. The festival "December Nights" (originally called "Christmas on the Prado") takes place in Balboa Park on the first full weekend in December each year. EarthFair, described as one of the largest free annual environmental fairs in the U.S., is held in the park every April. The event celebrates Earth Day, and includes a parade, musical performances, children's area, international food, exhibit booths and information on various topics related to the environment. In 2010, over 70,000 people attended the fair. The two-day San Diego Pride Festival is held in the Marston Point area of Balboa Park each July; the 2011 event was attended by more than 150,000 people. In 2016, WikiConference North America was held at the park. A cherry blossom festival is also celebrated annually in March in the Japanese Friendship Garden.

Each summer, free outdoor concerts are performed Monday through Thursday at the Spreckels Organ Pavilion. Free organ concerts are held each Sunday at 2:00 p.m., year round.

Several races and marathons include the park in the courses. The Foot Locker Cross Country Championships were held in Balboa Park annually from 1979 to 2024, taking place in Morley Field. Marathons such as the San Diego Rock 'n' Roll Marathon and the America's Finest City Half Marathon, as well as the American Cancer Society "Making Strides Against Breast Cancer" walk, and the Susan G. Komen "Race for the Cure" and other annual events begin or end in Balboa Park.

FlixBus services the park with a stop on Presidents Way near Pan American Plaza.

== The Haunted Trail of Balboa Park ==
The Haunted Trail of Balboa Park is a mile long scare-trail that is annually hosted at Balboa Park, San Diego. In 2025 it was ranked as one of the top 5 horror attractions in America by CNN. Visitors begin their journey in the eXperiment Maze, as you fight your way as cyberpunks hunt anything human. Visitors journey then continues into the Haunted Trail, where a variety of terrors will await its visitors. Visitors can then visit the DARK CARNIVAL, a scare zone with terrifying carnival games, and a place to get some food.

== Cultural references ==
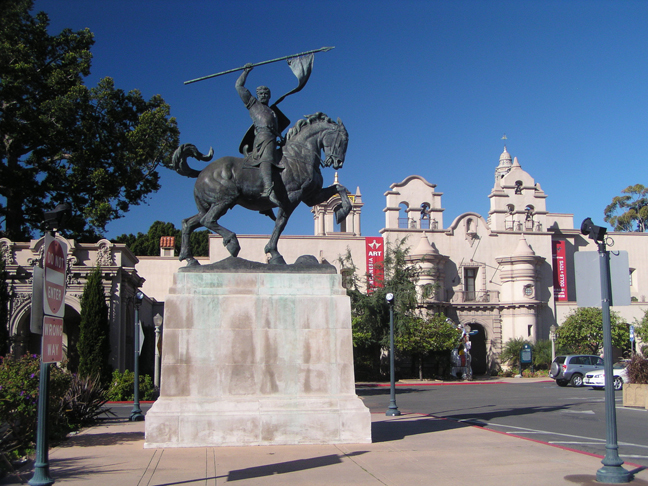
The "El Cid" sculpture, by artist Anna Hyatt Huntington. Dedicated in July 1930, the 23-foot bronze statue, along with an art library, was donated by Huntington and her husband.

- The video games Tony Hawk's Underground and Midnight Club 3: DUB Edition use Balboa Park for their San Diego levels.
- The public-access series Mega64 often films their sketches at Balboa Park.
- Bruce Springsteen's album The Ghost of Tom Joad includes a song about Balboa Park.
- The cover photo of the Beach Boys' album Pet Sounds was taken at the San Diego Zoo's children's petting zoo.
- MyNetworkTV's Desire filmed a 2006 episode scene in the Spreckels Organ Pavilion.
- Balboa Park is prominently featured as a setting for the 2007 naval thriller, Defiance, by Don Brown.

=== Film ===
- The 1915 silent film Fatty and Mabel at the San Diego Exposition takes place at the 1915 Exposition and stars Roscoe "Fatty" Arbuckle and Mabel Normand.
- Citizen Kane has scenes from Charles Kane's mansion "Xanadu" filmed at buildings in Balboa Park, with the San Diego Zoo standing in for Kane's private bestiary.
- The 1978 film Attack of the Killer Tomatoes was filmed in Balboa Park.
- Portions of the 1979 movie Scavenger Hunt were filmed in and around Balboa Park and the San Diego Zoo.
- The 1987 B-Movie Cry Wilderness features Balboa Park as a primary location
- The 1995 film Top Dog is set in Balboa Park.
- Traffic (2000) was filmed in Balboa Park.
- The California Tower appears in the film Almost Famous (2000).
- The 2003 movie National Lampoon Presents Dorm Daze's exterior shots of the "college campus" are from Balboa Park.
- Scenes from The Samuel Project (2018) were filmed in Balboa Park.

== Balboa Park Master Plan ==
The Balboa Park Master Plan is a long term plan made by the City of San Diego to ensure the longevity of the park in the coming years with the help of community members and their valuable input. As of 2026, an update to the original Balboa Park Master Plan adopted in 1989 was launched, asking visitors how they use the park and what needs improvement in order to create a condition report. According to the park’s official website, the full Community and Stakeholder Engagement Plan will be released in November 2026. As the condition report is completed, city officials can address the parks varied needs to make Balboa Park an engaging place for visitors and local residents.

== See also ==
- California native plants
- Central San Diego
- History of San Diego
- List of parks in San Diego
- Park Conservancy
