= Municipal Gymnasium =

Public gymnasium in San Diego, California, U.S.

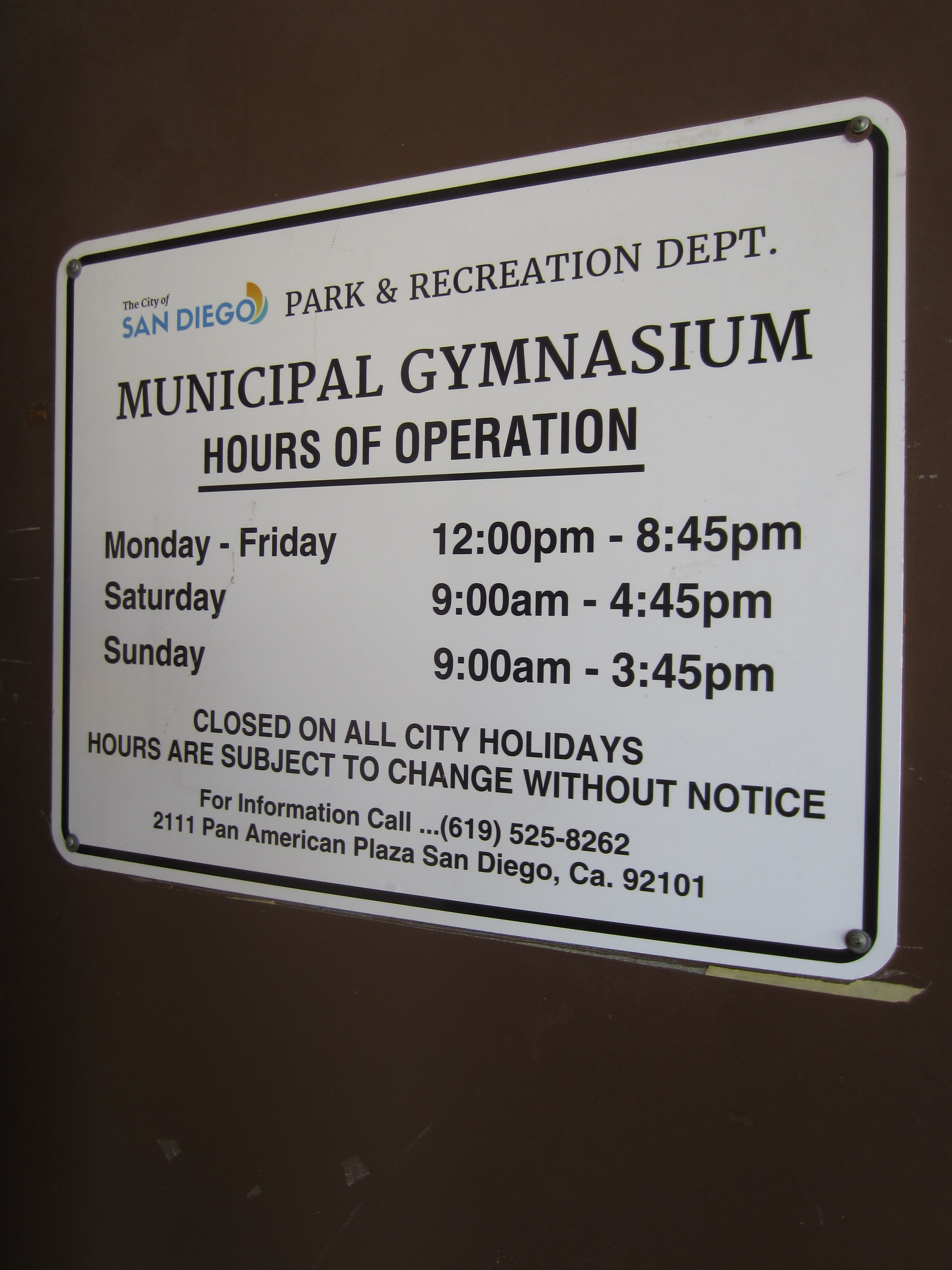

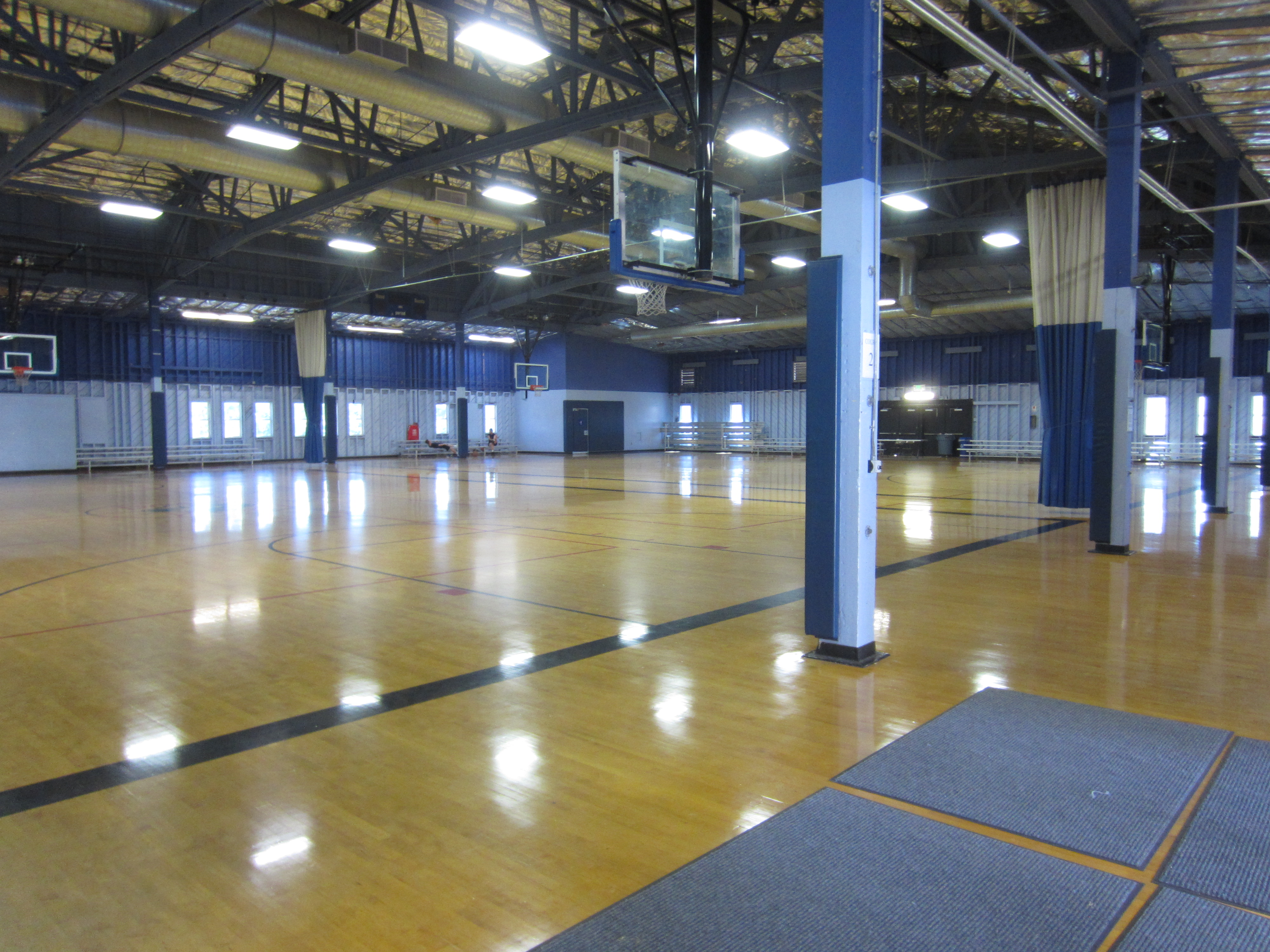
- The gym's interior, 2016

General information
- Type: Public gymnasium
- Location: 2111 Pan American Plaza, San Diego, California, US
- Coordinates: 32°43′37″N 117°9′11″W

The Municipal Gymnasium is a public gym located at 2111 Pan American Plaza in Balboa Park in San Diego, California.

== Gallery ==
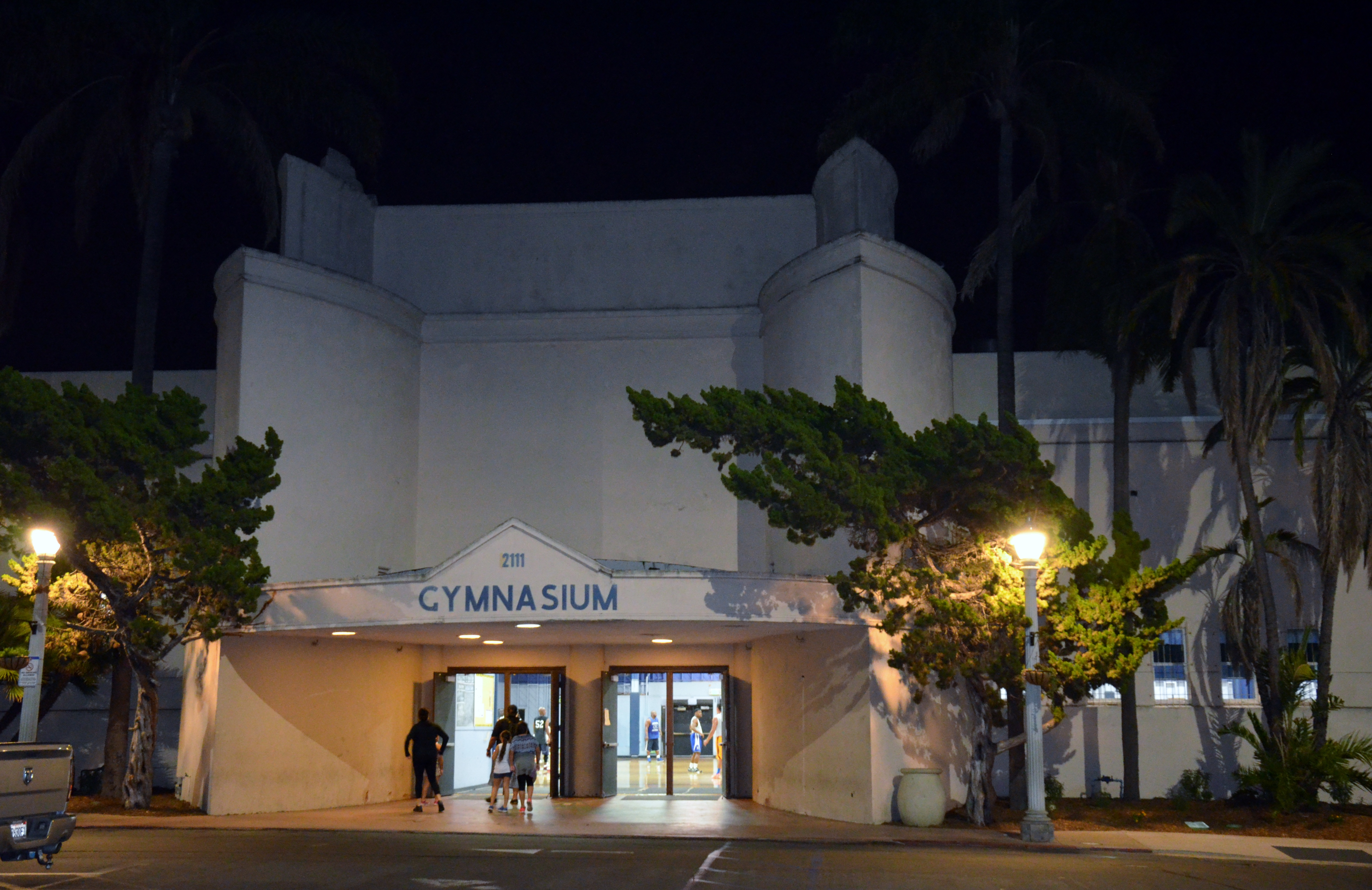

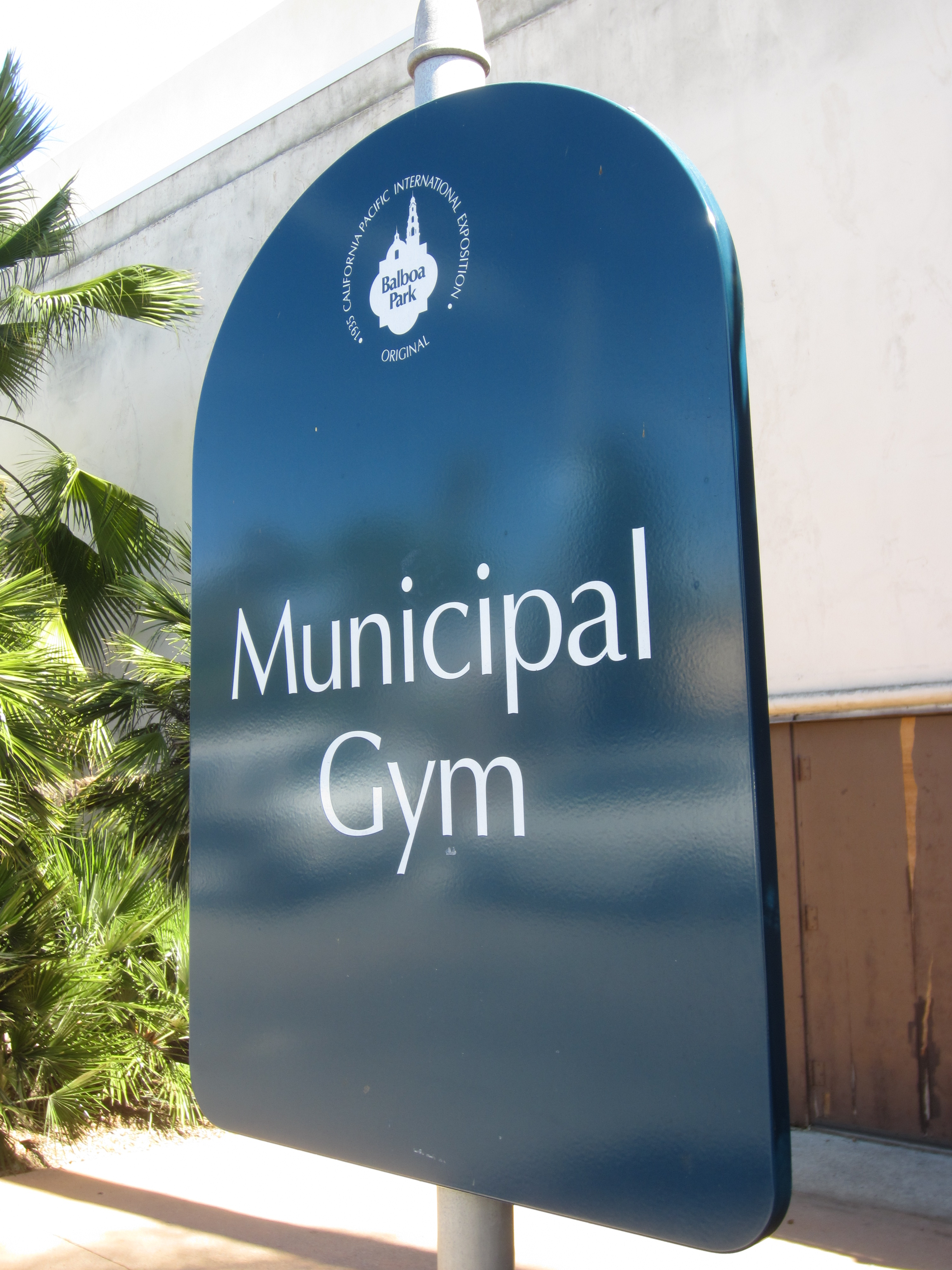
