= Veterans Museum and Memorial Center =

Museum in San Diego, California

Coordinates: 32.726°N 117.149°W

San Diego Veterans Museum
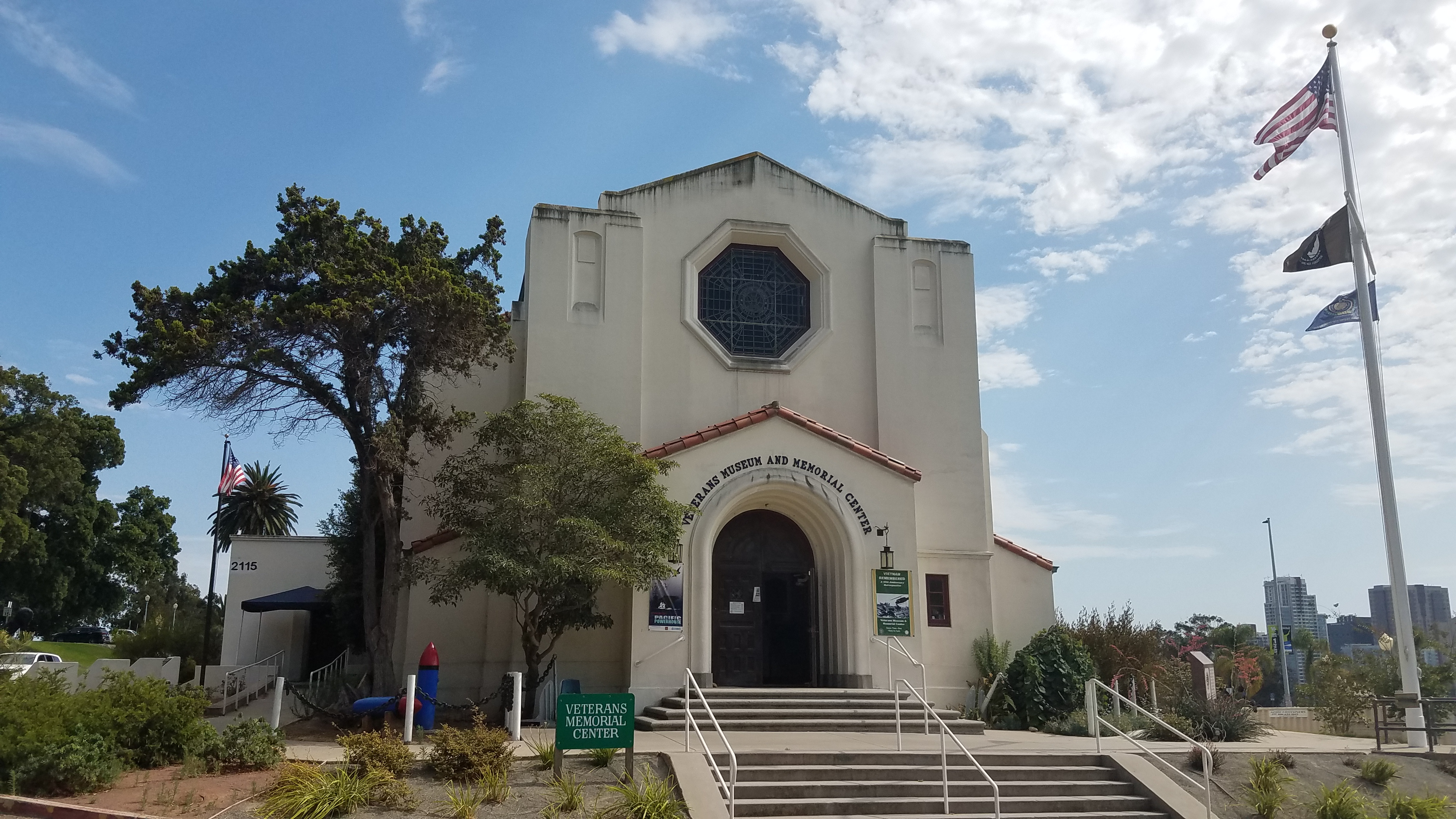
- Veterans Museum and Memorial Center
- Established: 1 January 1989
- Location: Balboa Park, San Diego, California
- Type: Military and war museum
- Collections: Historic items, artworks, and warfare murals
- Website: www.veteranmuseum.org

The San Diego Veterans Museum is a museum in Balboa Park in San Diego, California. Founded in 1989, it is dedicated to create, maintain, and operate an institution to honor and perpetuate the memories of all men and women who have served in the United States Armed Forces. The Veterans Museum is in the former Navy Chapel that was part of San Diego Naval Hospital. Hundreds of historic items and art works displayed in five galleries and the 2,000 square feet main hall with historic stained glass windows and dramatic warfare murals portray the experiences of U.S. Veterans who served worldwide in eras of both war and peace.
