= House of Pacific Relations International Cottages =

Building complex in the United States

Coordinates: 32.729°N 117.152°W

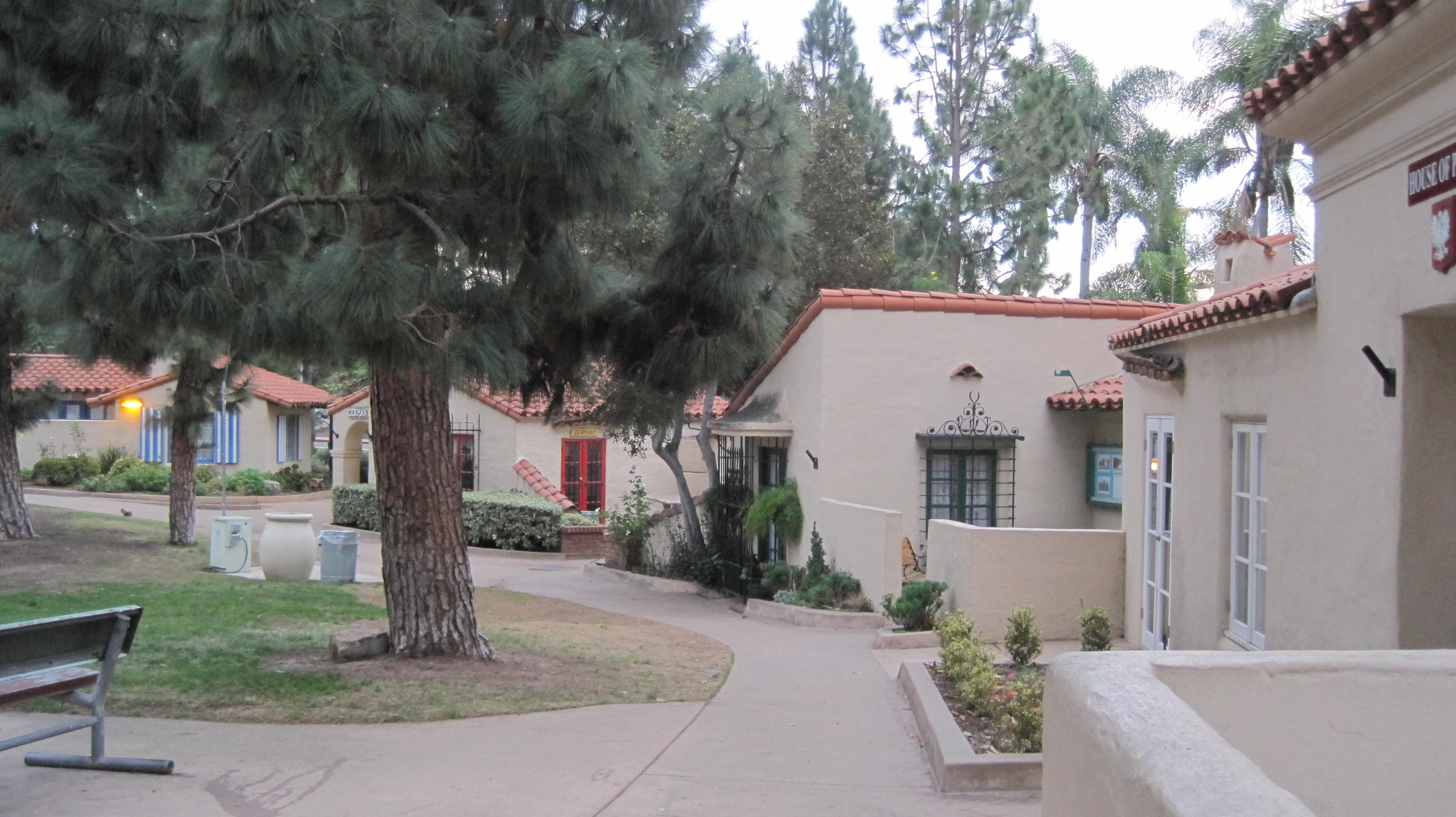
Several of the cottages in 2009

The House of Pacific Relations International Cottages is a complex of cottages in Balboa Park in San Diego, California. Built for the 1935 California Pacific International Exposition, they currently house 39 member nations that "promote multicultural goodwill and understanding through educational and cultural programs". Groups that do not have their own cottage meet in the nearby Hall of Nations. The United Nations Association of San Diego operates separately out of the neighboring United Nations Building.

Lawn program at the house of Pacific relations cottages.

An NBC 7 San Diego report examines how the House of Pacific Relations International Cottages in Balboa Park foster peace and collaboration during periods of ongoing global conflict. Dedicated volunteers from dozens of national houses showcase their heritage through traditions, traditional foods, and community programs in a shared public space. Even when nations face geopolitical tension abroad, local representatives work side by side to build mutual understanding and friendship among diverse cultural groups. Ultimately, the cottages serve as a working model of grassroots diplomacy, proving that cultural exchange builds unity across international divides.

In 2021, the House of Pacific Relations International Cottages expanded, adding nine new cottages for Mexico, Panama, the Philippines, Peru, India, Korea, Palestine, Turkey, and the Chamorro people (indigenous people of the Mariana Islands).

In 2025, the House of Somalia was added as the first cottage representing an African nation.

== Cottages ==
=== Current cottages ===
There are 31 cultures represented in the park represented by 30 cottages. Prior to 1992, Czechoslovakia was represented as a single cottage, and since its partition, both cultures still share the same cottage. The current 30 cottages are:

- (Guam) (Northern Mariana Islands) House of Chamorros
- House of China
- House of Colombia
- (Czech Republic) House of Czechia and Slovakia
- House of Denmark
- House of England
- House of Finland
- House of France (French Cottage)
- House of Germany
- House of Hungary
- House of India
- (Pahlavi dynasty) House of Iran
- (Republic of Ireland) House of Ireland
- House of Israel
- House of Italy
- (South Korea) House of Korea
- House of Mexico
- House of Norway
- House of Palestine
- House of Panama
- House of Peru
- House of the Philippines
- House of Poland
- House of Puerto Rico
- House of Scotland
- House of Spain
- House of Sweden
- (Turkey) House of Türkiye
- House of Ukraine
- (United States) House of USA

=== Houses without cottages ===
The Hall of Nations Building has been used on a rotating basis by member nations who don’t presently have a cottage; several times a year, these houses host the Hall of Nations. In 2011, houses representing Chile and Iraq were proposed by local groups, but neither submitted the corresponding applications. Currently, the 9 houses that are pending cottage status are:

- House of Afghanistan
- House of Lebanon
- House of Pakistan
- House of Romania
- House of Serbia
- House of Somalia
- House of Syria
- House of Taiwan
- (South Vietnam) House of Vietnam

=== Former houses ===
Some member nations suffer from dwindling membership and lack of interest. Due to this, some houses have been dissolved by their members. These are:

- House of Argentina
- House of Austria
- House of Ghana
- House of Lithuania
