= Morley Field Sports Complex =

Sports complex in California, United States

Coordinates: 32°43′53″N 117°08′43″W

- Interactive map of Morley Field Sports Complex
- Address: 2221 Morley Field Dr
- Location: Balboa Park, San Diego, California
- Owner: City of San Diego
- Operator: San Diego Parks & Recreation Department
- Capacity: Varies by facility
- Type: Sports complex

Construction
- Opened: 1910s

Website
- balboapark.org/recreation/morley-field-sports-complex

Morley Field Sports Complex is a sports complex in Balboa Park in San Diego, California. The complex was named after John Morley, who served as a park superintendent in Balboa Park from 1911 to 1939.

== Athletic facilities ==
=== Archery ===
An archery range is located in the sports complex. San Diego Archers runs events at the range.

=== Baseball, Softball, & Tee-ball ===
The sports complex offers multi-purpose ballfields, used for baseball, softball and tee-ball.

=== Cross country ===
The Morley Field cross country running course is a 1.5-mile/5000 meter cross country course in the complex. The Foot Locker Cross Country Championships are held on the cross country course. The San Diego State Aztecs women's cross country team and the San Diego High School Cavers cross country teams hosts meets at the course.

=== Cycling ===
The San Diego Velodrome is a banked 333.3-meter (0.2 mile) oval track cycling race track constructed in 1976. The track has 28-degree banked corners.

=== Disc golf ===
A disc golf course is located in the sports complex.

=== Golf ===
The Balboa Park Golf Complex contains a public 18-hole golf course and 9-hole executive course.

=== Lawn Bowling ===
There are two separate facilities dedicated to lawn bowling: one each for bocce (Italian lawn bowling) and pétanque (French lawn bowling). The bocce courts are located at the northeast portion of the sports complex. The Petanquedrome sits next to the east side of Bud Kearns Memorial Pool.

=== Swimming & water polo ===
The Bud Kearns Memorial Pool is located in the sports complex. The pool has 12 swimming lanes at a length of 44 yards and is "ideal for water polo."

=== Tennis ===
Maureen Connolly Brinker Stadium, a 1,500 seat tennis stadium dedicated on April 25, 1971, to beloved local tennis legend Maureen Connolly, anchors the Balboa Tennis Club, which includes 24 additional hard courts and other amenities.

== See also ==
- Balboa Park (San Diego) – Historic San Diego park
