= French Cottage =

The French Cottage or the House of France in Balboa Park in San Diego, California, is a founding member of the House of Pacific Relations (HPR). The House of France is the only French-American non-profit association in San Diego.

Lawn Program at the House of France, Balboa Park.

== Foundation ==
The House of Pacific Relations (HPR), a 501(c)(3) public benefit organization founded in 1936 and co-sponsored by the City of San Diego Department of Parks and Recreation, today encompasses 32 houses representing 32 countries which each offer visitors a window to their culture, history and traditions. Initially, 16 international houses were founded in 1935, namely the House of France, for the 1935 California Pacific International Exposition. Today the houses occupy the historic 1935 Exposition cottages plus 4 new cottages, provided by the City of San Diego in Balboa Park, which was constructed for the Panama–California Exposition in 1915 and enlarged for the California-Pacific International Exposition in 1935. The Balboa Park, a cultural urban park in San Diego, one of the oldest in the United States, includes some of the finest Spanish-Baroque Revival structures in America and it is on the National Register of Historic Places (NRHP).

Initially, the House of France was a place where French War brides gathered after World War II and speak French while adjusting to their new American life. Today, the House of France endeavors to maintain and enhance the spirit of understanding, tolerance and goodwill, among its members and with the national entities residing in the city and county of San Diego, by representing the history, traditions and culture of France to the attention of schools, cultural groups and private individuals.

== Activities ==
The House of Pacific Relations in general and the House of France in particular promote multicultural goodwill and understanding through numerous annual educational and cultural programs.

The House of France participates in city-wide events organized by the House of Pacific Relations in Balboa Park, such as the Ethnic Food Fair, Lawn Program, and December Nights. The Lawn Program features music, dance, traditional costumes, arts, crafts, and traditional French food, such as onion soup, puff pastries and mille-feuille (also known in the US as Napoléon). The Ethnic Food Fair and December Nights, initially called "Christmas on the Prado", feature live entertainment (organ music at the Spreckels Organ Pavilion) and ethnic food.

The House of France also hosts several events of its own throughout the year. Some are open to the public, namely the Open House every first and second Sunday of the month from noon to 4:00 pm. Other are reserved to members of the House of France: Crepe Day in the beginning of February, Easter Egg Hunt in April, Games Day in May, Annual Picnic in June and/or September, Santa Claus visit by the end of December and a monthly Children's Club.

== See also ==
- San Diego
- Balboa Park
