= San Diego Velodrome =

American bicycle racing track

- Interactive map of San Diego Velodrome
- Location: 2221 Morley Field Dr., San Diego
- Coordinates: 32.737007°N 117.140587°W
- Owner: San Diego Parks and Recreation
- Operator: San Diego Velodrome Association
- Surface: Pole lane is concrete. Above the pole is asphalt with Chem-Coat surfacing.
- Field size: 333m oval track

Construction
- Built: 1976

Website
- sdvelodrome.com

The San Diego Velodrome is a 333m velodrome in Morley Field Sports Complex in San Diego, California. Constructed in 1975 and resurfaced in 2010, it is owned by San Diego Parks and Recreation. Currently operated by the San Diego Velodrome Association, the track hosts regular races sanctioned by Cycling USA and training nights. In 2007, the track hosted the USA Cycling Collegiate Track National Championships.

== See also ==
- List of cycling tracks and velodromes
