= Alfred R. Mitchell =

American painter (1888–1972)

Alfred R. Mitchell (1888-1972) was an American landscape painter. He was an early California Impressionist painter. Educated at the Pennsylvania Academy of Fine Arts, he was the president of the San Diego Art Guild and the La Jolla Art Association. He became known as the "Dean of San Diego County artists".

== Early life ==
Alfred R. "Fred" Mitchell was born on June 18, 1888, in York, Pennsylvania. His father George Mitchell (ca. 1855-1927) worked as a waiter, an insurance man, and a farmer, while his mother Carrie Swazey Mitchell (1858-1928) was a college-educated schoolteacher. Mitchell had two siblings: George Rankin Mitchell (1895-1986) and Carrie Mitchell (1898-1968). The family migrated west in 1903 and set themselves up in the hotel business in the gold country of west central Nevada. In 1908, the Mitchells moved to San Diego, California and opened what would become a successful cafeteria, "Mitchell’s."

Mitchell left home as a teenager. At age 17, he was living on his own and making a living driving a stagecoach and working on the railroad in western Nevada. After a few years, however, he returned to work in the cafeteria and make up for the years of education that he had lost.

In 1913, Mitchell took up the serious study of art, having approached San Diego’s most distinguished artist, landscape painter Maurice Braun, for lessons. He decided to pursue a career as a professional artist after winning a silver medal for "Coldwater Canyon, Arrowhead Hot Springs" (ca. 1914) at the 1915 Panama–California Exposition. In 1916, he enrolled at the Pennsylvania Academy of Fine Arts and won the Cresson Traveling Scholarship and the Edward Bok Philadelphia Prize to visit museums in Europe in 1920; he graduated from the academy in 1921. He served in the United States Army between April 1918 and February 1919 during World War I.

== Life ==
Mitchell met his future wife Dorothea Webster (1894-1985) in 1920 and married her on July 1, 1922. Dorothea was the daughter of Dr. Isaac Daniel Webster, and his wife Anna Jenkins Webster, both members of the Religious Society of Friends, or Quakers. An intelligent and highly articulate woman, Dorothea matriculated at Pomona College in 1912 and graduated from the University of California, Berkeley.

Dorothea Webster Mitchell helped to manage her husband’s career. She hung his first one-man show at the La Jolla Art Association’s gallery in 1923. She traveled with him, hosted picture showings at their home studio, monitored sales, and encouraged potential buyers.

The Mitchells carved out studio space in apartments and rented houses before building their own house in the Golden Hill neighborhood of San Diego in 1937. Architect Lloyd Ruocco, working in the office of Richard S. Requa, designed an inexpensive but unique house that incorporated two studios.

== Career ==
Mitchell produced carefully rendered realist paintings in a style known as California Impressionism or California Plein-Air Painting. Early works include "Sunset Glow, California" (1924), "Morning on the Bay" (1923–25), and "Summer Hills" (1929) that captured the beginning of San Diegoʻs suburban sprawl.

In the 1920s, Mitchell and his wife took regular trips to Pennsylvania to visit family in Bucks County. His paintings of the Pennsylvania landscape include "The Delaware Valley" (1926–27) that was purchased for the San Diego Fine Arts Gallery.

Mitchell exhibited with local arts organizations such as the San Diego Art Guild, founded in 1915, and the La Jolla Art Association, founded in 1918. He served as president of the San Diego Art Guild in 1922-23 and helped in the establishment of the San Diego Museum of Art. He was a member of the museum’s first board of directors. He exhibited at the San Diego Fine Arts Gallery (later the San Diego Museum of Art); the La Jolla Library; the Pacific Southwest Exposition in Long Beach, 1928; the California State Fair, 1930; the California-Pacific International Exposition, 1935; the California Art Club; the Laguna Beach Museum of Art; the Buck Hills Falls Art Association; and the Golden Gate Exposition in San Francisco.

To promote the work of professional artists, Mitchell collaborated with colleagues to form the Contemporary Artists of San Diego in 1929. Founding members were Charles Reiffel, Maurice Braun, Charles A. Fries, Elliot Torrey, Otto Schneider, Leslie W. Lee, and James T. Porter, and Alfred R. Mitchell. Everett Gee Jackson, Leon Bonnet, and Donal Hord joined later. The group held six major exhibitions at the Fine Arts Gallery with a final show in 1937.

Starting in 1933, Mitchell and other members of the San Diego Art Guild organized an annual Art Mart, an outdoor market on the lawn of the San Diego Public Library. Outdoor sales continued into the 1960s.

Mitchell helped to establish the Chula Vista Art Guild in Chula Vista, California in 1945. He served as president of the La Jolla Art Association from 1951 to 1961.

Mitchell taught painting and drawing through the Adult Education Program of the San Diego City Schools between 1922 and 1953. He offered private classes from 1923 to 1966.

Mitchell’s championship of the San Diego’s art and cultural scene caused him to acknowledged as the "Dean of San Diego County artists" in 1950.

== Death ==
Mitchell died on November 9, 1972, at the age of 84. His wife Dorothea Webster Mitchell survived him, living until 1984.

== Awards ==
- Silver Medal, Panama-California Exposition, 1915
- The Cresson European Traveling Scholarship, 1920
- The Philadelphia Prize, Pennsylvania Academy of Fine Arts, 1920
- The Leisser-Farnham Prize, San Diego, 1937
- Purchase Prize, Buck Hill Falls Art Association, Pennsylvania, 1939
- Highest Award, Laguna Beach Art Association, 1940
- First Prize, San Diego County Fair, 1950 and 1951
- Award of Distinction, San Diego Art Institute Fiesta Del Pacifico, 1956
- Invited Honorary Invitational Exhibition, Laguna Beach, 1948
- Invited California Exhibition, Golden Gate International Exposition, 1939 and 1940
- First Award and Purchase Prize for Oil Painting, San Diego Art Institute Annual Exhibition, 1960

== Memberships ==
- California Art Club
- Laguna Beach Art Association
- San Diego Art Guild
- La Jolla Art Association
- Contemporary Artists of San Diego
- Chula Vista Art Guild

== Galleries and public collections ==
- Irvine Museum, Irvine, California
- San Diego Museum of Art (Silent Light: Alfred Mitchell 2018 exhibition)
- San Diego Museum of Man (San Diego Museum of Us)
- San Diego History Center
- San Diego Public Library
- Sharp Memorial Hospital, San Diego
- Blanden Memorial Art Museum, Fort Dodge, Iowa
- University of West Virginia
- The Reading Museum, Reading, Pennsylvania
- Ohio Wesleyan University
- Archives of American Art, Smithsonian Institution
