= Carl Thorp =

American painter

Carl M Thorp
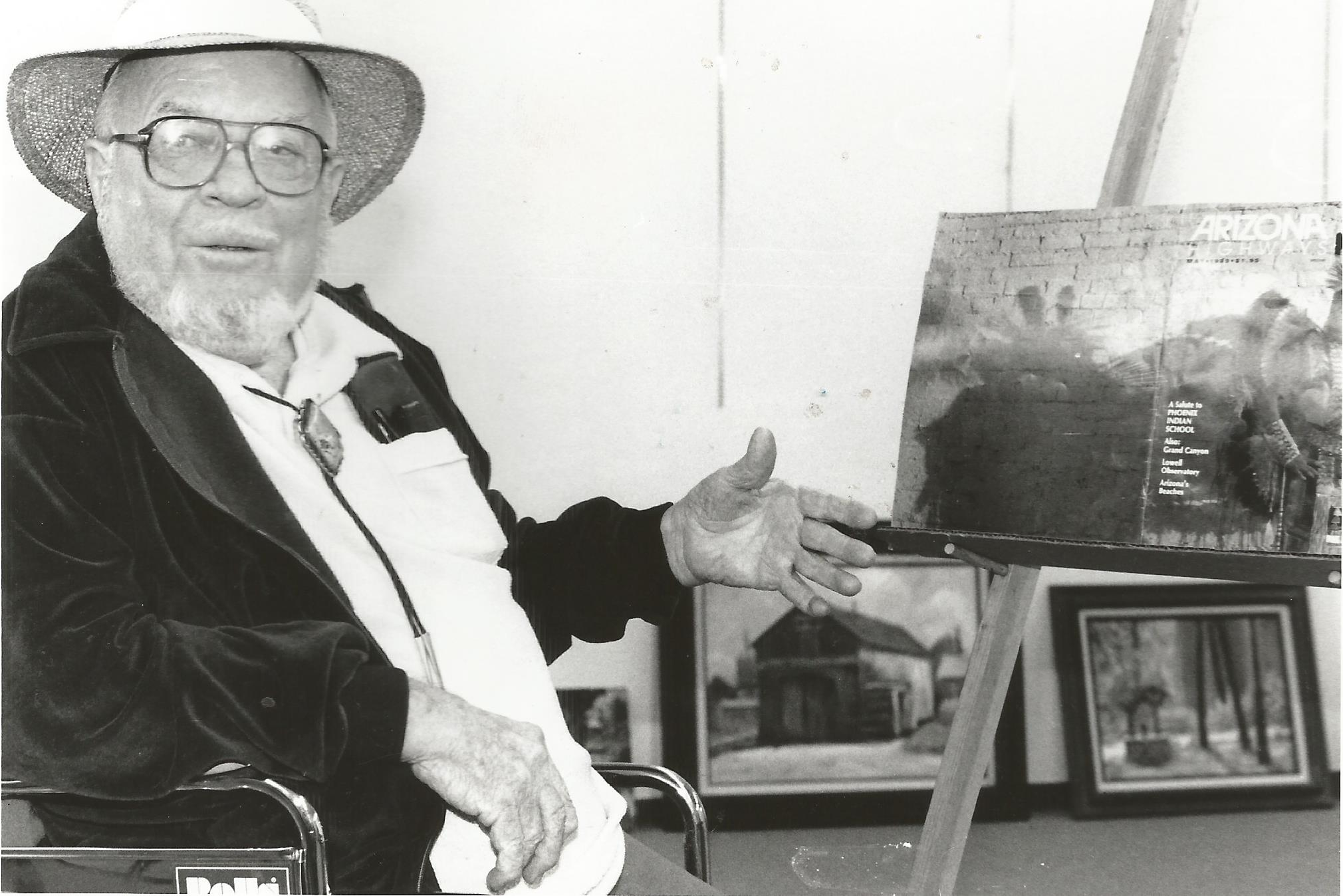
- Thorp in the 1970s
- Born: Carl Maurice Thorp; October 25, 1912; Lubbock, Texas, U.S.
- Died: December 18, 1989 (aged 77); Franklinton, Louisiana, U.S.
- Education: Alfred Mitchell; Maurice Braun; Academy of Fine Arts
- Known for: Painting, teaching

Carl Thorp (1912–1989) was an American artist who became known for Impressionist landscapes of California, sometimes referred to as California Scene Painting, as well as New York City, Boston and New Orleans Cityscapes. He was born in Lubbock, Texas on November 14, 1912.

According to a friend, Carl knew in his early teens he wanted art to be his path in life. But his father was not very amused by Carl’s interest and only bought him black and white oil paints. Perhaps this was his father’s attempt to discourage Carl. At the age of 16 Carl left home heading for San Diego, California. There he studied at the San Diego State College, and the Academy of Fine Arts (1932-1935) under Maurice Braun and Alfred R. Mitchell.

In the 1950s he organized art schools throughout California and was the Director at the Art center on Lombard street2 and oil painting instructor at Peninsula Arts & Crafts, School of Fine Arts in the mid-1950s.

In the late 1950s Thorp moved to Louisiana where he lived part-time for most of his career and eventually died. According to the Biloxi Daily Herald March 22, 1970, Carl had a studio at 809 Bourbon St. in New Orleans.

Carl frequently traveled up the coast to New York, and Massachusetts and many of his paintings contain subject matter from these locals.
