= San Diego History Center =

Museum in San Diego, California

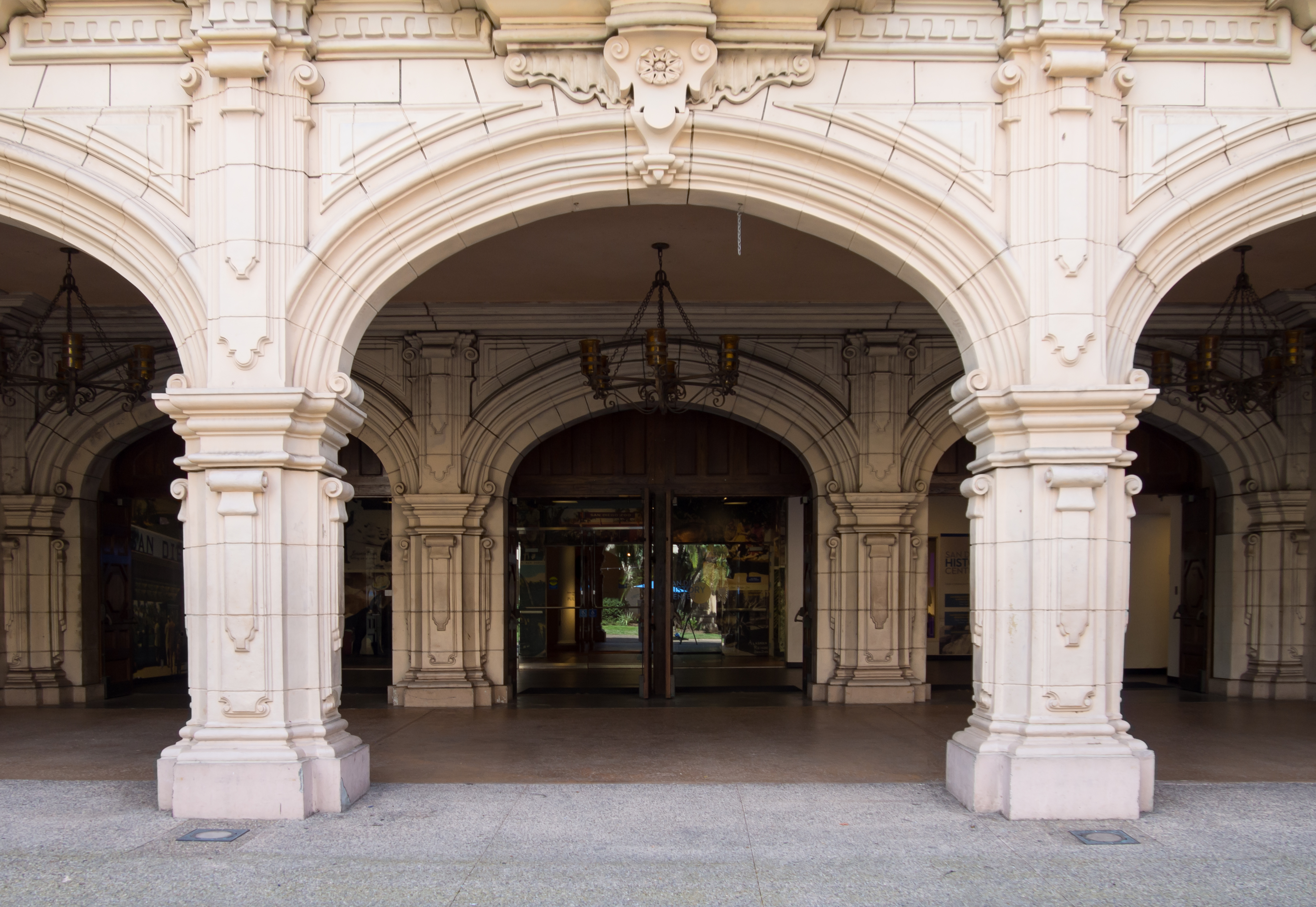
- Entrance of the San Diego History Center in Balboa Park

- Location within San Diego Location within California Location within the United States
- Former name: San Diego Historical Society
- Location: Casa de Balboa; San Diego, California, U.S.
- Coordinates: 32.7311°N 117.1483°W
- Founder: George Marston
- Website: sandiegohistory.org

The San Diego History Center is a museum in Balboa Park in San Diego, California, dedicated to the history of San Diego.

== Description and history ==
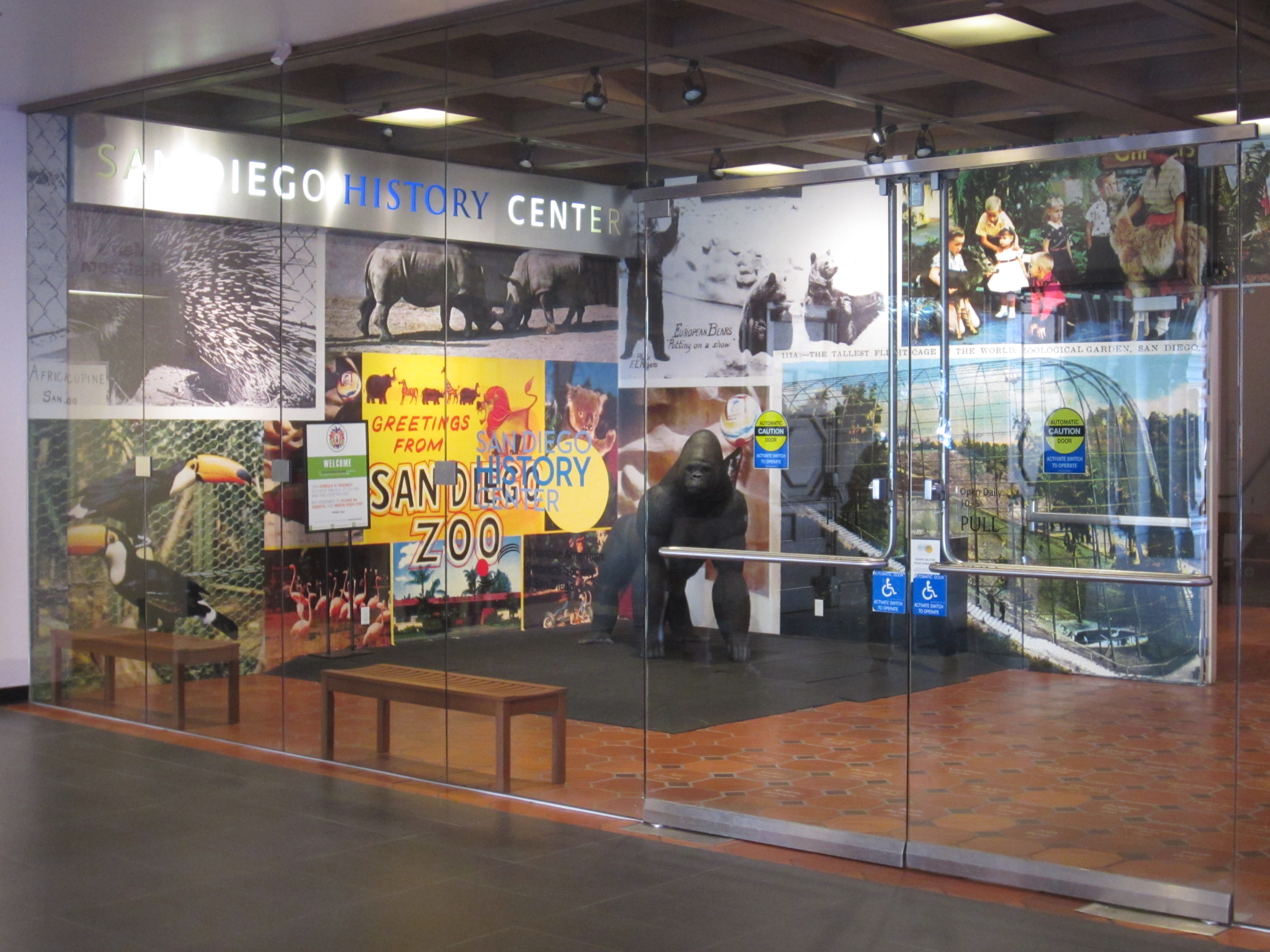
Inside the San Diego History Center

Founded in 1928 by businessman and civic leader George W. Marston, the San Diego Historical Society was housed in the Mission style Junípero Serra Museum on Presidio Hill, the site of the earliest settlement in San Diego and California. The original building was designed by architect William Templeton Johnson. In 1982, the San Diego Historical Society moved its collections and research library to the Casa de Balboa building in Balboa Park (maintaining the Serra Museum as an auxiliary museum and education center), and the Society changed its name to the San Diego History Center in 2010.

Of special note among the museum's collections are the Historic Clothing and Textile Collection, which includes over 7,000 items illustrating the history of dress from the late 18th century to the present, and the San Diego Fine Art Collection, notable for its early 20th century plein air paintings, with works by Maurice Braun, Alfred Mitchell, Charles Fries, Belle Baranceanu, Charles Reiffel, Alice Ellen Klauber, and Donal Hord.

In addition to its museum exhibits, the History Center maintains a research library and archives serving residents, scholars, students and researchers. The Document Archives, the region’s largest collection of historical materials, holds over 45 million documents including public and architectural records, books, maps, scrapbooks, manuscripts, newspapers, ephemera, diaries and oral histories.

The photograph collection, with 2.5 million photographs, is one of the largest regional photography collections in the United States. It includes a large number of 19th and early 20th century images of the San Diego region acquired in 1979 from the Union Title & Trust Insurance Company; important additions to the collection in the 1980s and 1990s include the entire collection of the San Diego Union-Tribune newspaper prior to 1981. Highlights of the photograph collection include the Edward H. Davis Collection of Indian Photographs and Drawings, 1900s-1940s, and the Norman Baynard Collection of the African-American Community of Logan Heights, 1939-1985.

Since 1955 the center has published the Journal of San Diego History in cooperation with the University of San Diego. In 2013, the History Center became a Smithsonian Affiliate.

== See also ==
- List of historical societies in California
- Bum (San Diego dog)
