= Robert Ortlieb =

American sculptor

Robert Eugene Ortlieb
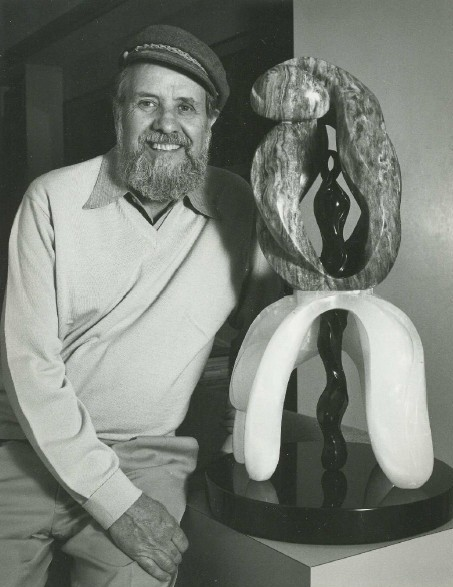
- Born: July 4, 1925; San Diego, California
- Died: August 14, 2011 (aged 86); Coachella Valley, CA
- Education: University of Southern California
- Known for: Sculpture, drawings
- Notable work: "For They Know Not What They Do", "Emergence", "Todtentanz", "Phoenix", "Mother and Child", "Reflections", "After Eden", "Eve", "The Three Traitors", "Etheric Visions"
- Spouse: Donna Forman Ortlieb

Robert Ortlieb (1925–2011) was an American sculptor born in San Diego, California. His career spanned six decades, from the 1940s into the 21st century. At age twenty-nine, Ortlieb had his work selected for exhibition in the Cincinnati Art Museum's Third International Biennial of Contemporary Color Lithography, alongside works by Pablo Picasso, Marc Chagall, and others.

He subsequently exhibited in major museums and galleries throughout the United States and abroad. His international exposure includes a series of museum exhibits sponsored by the American Federation of Arts, in collaboration with the United States Foreign Service. His work entered multiple permanent collections held by major institutions, and he received numerous juried museum exhibition awards.

His sculptural practice encompassed a wide range of materials, including rare woods, alabaster, marble, lapis lazuli, onyx, sandstone, bronze, hammered sheet copper, terracotta, and plexiglass. Ortlieb employed a method he referred to as "incarving," working from the inside out to open the inner structure of the material. His decision not to rely on preparatory drawings reflected his command of material and form. Drawing functioned as an independent mode of expression rather than as a planning tool for sculpture, and he produced an extensive body of drawings in India ink and pencil.

== Institutional exhibit highlights ==
Robert Ortlieb's work has been featured at major museums and galleries throughout the United States and abroad.

- California Art Club Annual Gold Medal Juried Exhibitions, 1965-1968, 1971
- Château-Musée de Dieppe, Dieppe, France, 1955
- Cincinnati Art Museum, 1954
- Crocker Art Museum, 1957
- Dallas Museum of Art, 1953
- Denver Art Museum, 1951
- Edward-Dean Museum & Gardens, 1975, 1984
- Illinois State Museum, 1964
- Laguna Art Museum, 1957-1959, 1977
- Long Beach Museum of Art, 1952, 1955, 1957, 1961
- Los Angeles County Museum of Art, 1954, 1955, 1961
- Museum of Contemporary Art, Zagreb, 1956
- Museum of Modern Art Dubrovnik, 1956
- Museum of Modern Art (Ljubljana, Slovenia), 1956
- Norton Simon Museum of Art (formerly named Pasadena Art Institute), 1950
- Oakland Art Museum, 1958
- Palm Springs Art Museum, 1981
- Riverside Art Museum, 1981
- Santa Barbara Museum of Art, 1948
- San Diego Museum of Art, 1947, 1950, 1953

== Known permanent collections ==
- Aeolus, Crocker Art Museum
- Moses, Laguna Museum of Art
- Standing Woman, Palm Springs Art Museum
- The City, Fine Arts Museums of San Francisco, Achenbach Foundation
- The Martyr, Riverside Art Museum

== Juried award win highlights ==
Ortlieb received repeated top juried sculpture awards from leading institutions, reflecting sustained curatorial and peer recognition over three decades.

- Laguna Art Museum, 1957, 1958, 1959, 1977
- California Art Club Annual Juried Exhibition, Sculpture Award, 1965, 1966, 1967, 1968, 1971
- All-California Art Exhibit, National Orange Show, 1957, 1965
- San Diego Museum of Art (formerly named Fine Arts Gallery of San Diego), 1950, 1953

== Select public installations ==
- Apothecaries bronze relief at the University of Southern California Alfred E. Mann School of Pharmacy and Pharmaceutical Sciences
- Mother and Child monumental abstract bronze at the Costa Mesa-Donald Dungan Library plaza
- Etheric Male at the University of California, Riverside Tomás Rivera Library
- Etheric Female at Riverside Community College
- Mother and Child, a 9-foot figurative terracotta piece at The Neighborhood Church of Palos Verdes, California
- The Burning Bush at Temple Isaiah Jewish Community Center of Palm Springs
- Palos Verdes Estates City Hall Roessler Memorial

== Early life and education ==
Robert Ortlieb was born in San Diego in 1925 to William Ortlieb and Ruth Powers Ortlieb, a California Modernist painter and teacher. Ruth Ortlieb received a Master of Fine Arts degree from Claremont College while studying under Millard Sheets and taught art at San Diego State College. She joined Dorr Bothwell, Donal Hord, and Everett Gee Jackson among others to form a group known as the "San Diego Moderns". She traveled extensively and exhibited widely during the 1930s, including at the San Diego Fine Art Gallery, the Cincinnati Art Museum, the Pasadena Art Institute, the California Pacific International Exposition, and the Golden Gate International Exhibition.

Robert Ortlieb attended Manual Arts High School in Los Angeles, where his art teacher urged him to pursue formal education in the arts. Ortlieb earned both a Bachelor of Fine Arts and a Master of Fine Arts at the University of Southern California, where he became a protégé of sculptor Robert Merrell Gage and also studied under Francis de Erdely, Edgar Ewing, and Glen Lukens. Following graduate study, Ortlieb traveled extensively in Mexico, South America, and Europe, where sustained engagement with megalithic traditions, Michelangelo's stone sculpture, and German Renaissance wood carving further informed his approach to form and material.

Throughout his youth and adulthood, Ortlieb also made frequent trips into the High Sierras and Canadian Rockies. Ortlieb once commented: "I could really feel the excitement of the elements in those remote places. It was like an explosion in the mind's eye." Painter and art historian Janice Lovoos stated, "His early confrontations with nature are reflected in his sculptures. They soar into enveloping space. We catch a glimpse of the rhythm of the universe."

== Academic and curatorial relevance ==
Robert Ortlieb's sculptural practice demonstrates an understanding of human form, with an abstract and modernist sensibility, expressed in a variety of materials—stone, bronze, rare wood, terracotta, and plexiglass. His approach—working directly into stone and wood without preparatory drawings—provides a documentable example of direct-carving methodology in postwar American sculpture.

Ortlieb's professional standing was recognized through formal lecture-demonstrations at major institutions, including an invited presentation at the Los Angeles County Museum of Art in 1954. He continued to present at universities, museums, and international art centers, where his demonstrations emphasized the relationship between material resistance, expressive form, and humanistic subject matter. These presentations established his work as a bridge between studio practice and institutional pedagogy.

Ortlieb also garnered a devoted following among students at diverse venues including University of Southern California (USC) Idyllwild Arts Foundation, Loma Linda University, Palos Verdes Arts Center, Riverside Art Museum, Palm Springs Village Center for the Arts, and the Institute Professionale de Stato per l'Industria de l'Artigianato del Marmo in Carrara, Italy.

In recognition of his professional standing, expertise, and reputation, Ortlieb was invited to participate as a judge in a number of juried art exhibitions, including the Beverly Hills Art Show, the Orange County Fair Fine Arts Competition, and the Pasadena Outdoor Arts Fair.

== Reception ==
Robert Ortlieb's work was featured in American Artist magazine and other publications.

Examples of how his work has been characterized are as follows:

- Arthur Millier, art critic for the Los Angeles Times: "I spotted one work of superb wood carving, Robert Ortlieb's 'Todtentanz' or Dance of Death. Two skeletons, the macabre dance rhythm carried through to the last gouge mark. You can bet your last buck it won't win a prize. It doesn't fit any modern category. It's JUST ART."
- Howard Burke, art critic for the Los Angeles Examiner: "In his direct approach, hewing directly into the marble with his chisel without preliminary sketches, Ortlieb captures and reveals reality in a search for universal artistic forms. It is astonishing to see him work... [Ortlieb] will attack the marble roughshod with the chisel, working directly. The result is an aliveness, a sensitive freshness. He has made monumental religious sculpture in expressionistic modern style for churches. His leonine head of Moses depicts a sternness associated with this remarkable prophet. There is a fine feeling for form, balance, rhythm, and experience in nature in his abstract designs."
- Carolyn Strickler, art critic for the Los Angeles Examiner and historian for the Los Angeles Times: "The Martyr, done in redwood burl, one of the most difficult woods in the world to work with, is Ortlieb's newest sculpture.. one of the most impressive examples of his depth of imagination, craftsmanship, and considerable talent..(it) successfully embodies concepts of major importance which have concerned Robert Ortlieb for almost ten years."
- Spencer Barefoot, art critic for the San Francisco Chronicle, wrote in 1948 when Ortlieb was just 22 years old: "The few pieces on exhibit would cause one to count [Robert Ortlieb] as a promising young talent."
- Janice Lovoos, author and art historian: "He carves beyond what he is able to express in words. In his more complex pieces, he makes ample use of incarving, an incredibly difficult technique in which he works from the inside out - opening up the inner structure of the material. In this remarkable manner he may carve miniscule heads out of other carved heads, faces within eyes, mouths within mouths, or an arabesque of figures. Vitality springs from every form. HIs work may boggle the mind, stretch the imagination to new limits. What is he trying to tell us? In essence, he is attempting to portray the eternal struggle of man to better the human condition. To exchange an unsatisfying material state of consciousness for a real and lasting spiritual awareness."
- Author Norman Corwin: "Ortlieb makes a solid virtue of passion regardless of modes, media, substance, and treatment; that he charges his materials with so much energy and emotion that they breathe, swirl, rise, fall, and replicate; that with uncommon vigor he compounds pain, ecstasy, tension, and mystery. Not the least astonishing aspect of Ortlieb is his versatility. I am aware of no other painter or sculptor, including some of the most notable of the past or present, who exceeds his range or expresses as many moods or emotions."

== Personal life ==
Ortlieb married Donna Forman Ortlieb in 1976. Donna Ortlieb danced professionally for Pacific Ballet Theatre and toured briefly with Holiday on Ice. She later became an attorney and practiced criminal law in Southern California. They raised Donna's two children from a previous marriage, Adam Ortlieb and Sarah Fraser.

== Controversies ==
In 1957 a nine-foot walnut statue by Ortlieb of the Crucifixion of Jesus entitled "For They Know Not What They Do" was placed in Westwood Community Methodist Church. Ortlieb described it as including "every conflict imaginable: life and death, good and evil, intense suffering and a powerful spiritual message". In March of that year associate pastor Dr. Alfred W. Painter said there had been objections to the sculpture but that its overall impact had been positive. The next month, however, Ortlieb was told to remove the work "in the interest of the congregation". Painter said he wished the sculpture could remain, but that "its effectiveness made the congregation uncomfortable". Ortlieb said "If one person got the message I have instilled in the statue I feel I have accomplished what I wanted to do."

In 1998, Ortlieb's bronze sculpture "Emergence", which was then on loan to the city of Oceanside, California, and displayed in the foyer of the city's Planning Department, was mysteriously covered with a curtain or drapery material. In 2000 the same work, which weighs 480 pounds and was completed in 1979, was included in an exhibition at the Palos Verdes Art Center entitled "Big Sculpture".
