= Otto Schneider =

Otto Schneider may refer to:

- Otto Schneider (artist)
- Otto Schneider (SS officer)
