= San Diego Model Railroad Museum =

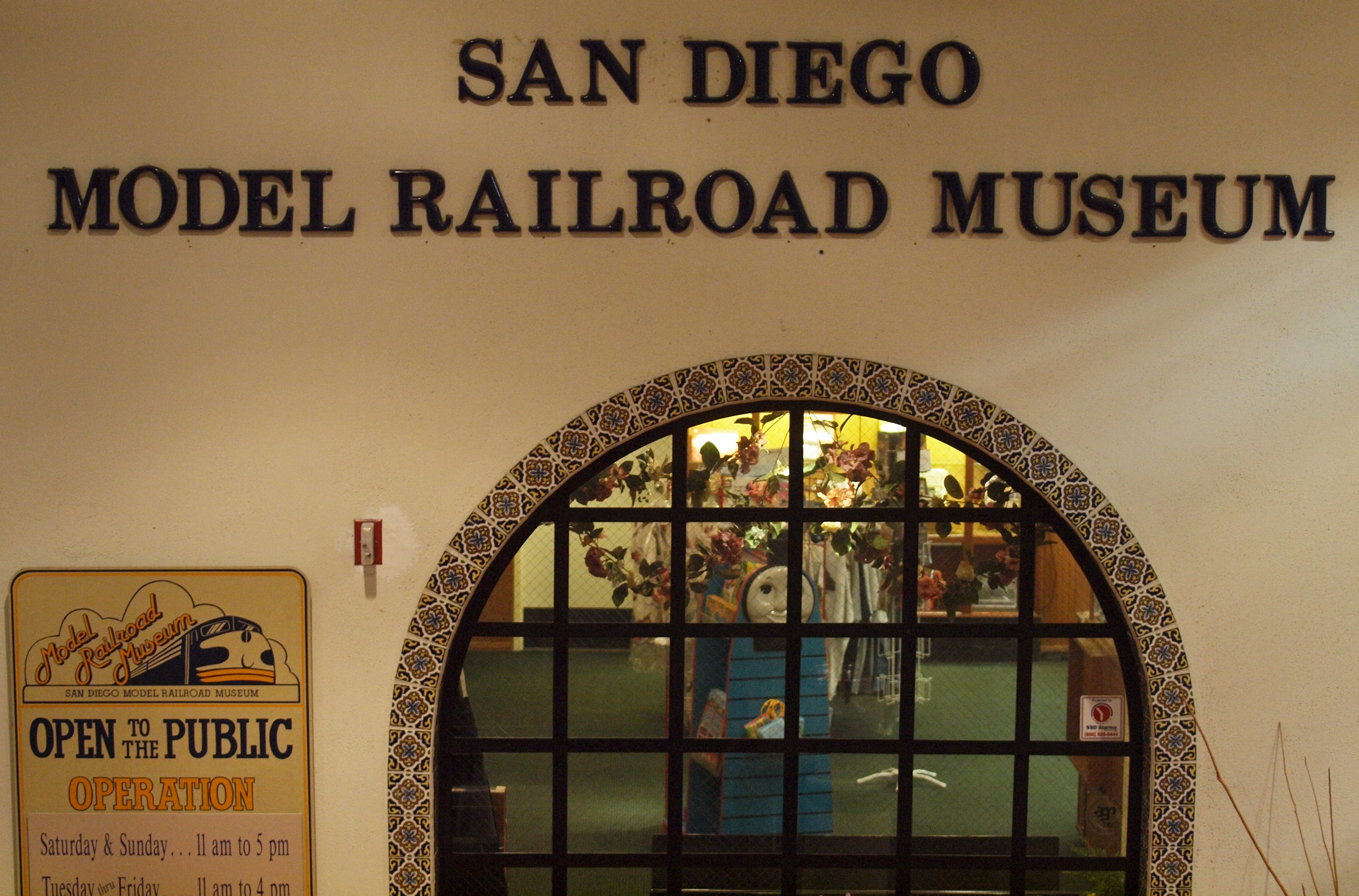

- Location within San Diego Location within California Location within the United States
- Established: 1980
- Location: Casa de Balboa; Balboa Park, San Diego, California
- Coordinates: 32°43′52″N 117°8′52″W
- Type: Museum and Exhibition Hall
- Director: Michael Warburton
- Website: http://www.sdmrm.org/

The San Diego Model Railroad Museum is a museum in San Diego, California, that focuses on the heritage of railroading through model railroads. It was founded in 1982. The museum is located on the lower level of Casa de Balboa in Balboa Park.

At 27,000 sq. ft., it is the largest model railroad museum in North America. It was visited by nearly three million people in its first three decades. The museum is a 501(c)(3) organization non-profit charity.

== History ==
Model railroading in Balboa Park began at the 1935 California Pacific International Exposition. In the 1930s, pioneer model railroader Minton Cronkhite designed and directed the construction of a number of scale model railroads in the 1930s, including a large exposition O scale model railroad in Balboa Park. The Atchison, Topeka and Santa Fe Railway, as well as Pennsylvania Railroad, hired him to create giant model railroads for world fairs to stimulate interest in train travel and help revive the national economy during the years of the Great Depression. His 40-by-70-foot model railroad exhibit was the "chief transportation feature" of the 1935 exposition.

The San Diego Model Railroad Museum opened in 1982 with a mission to "preserve the heritage of railroading through a series of miniature representations of California railroads, research and preserve the history of model railroading, and educate the public in the many different aspects of railroading."

== Exhibits ==
As of November 2026, the museum is open Wednesday through Sunday from 11 a.m. to 4 p.m. Admission is $20 for adults, and discounts are available for seniors, veterans, students, children, and EBT/Snap card holders.

With 27,000 square feet (2508 m^{2}) of exhibit space, the museum is home of some of the largest HO and N scale layouts of their types. There are two massive HO scale layouts, a 1,200 sq ft (110 m^{2}) N scale layout, a 2,700 sq ft (250 m^{2}) O scale layout, and a Lionel type 3-Rail O gauge Toy Train gallery.

- Cabrillo & Southwestern (O scale). This 2,700 sq ft (250 m^{2}) layout is a freelance representation of a route from San Diego to Sacramento.
- Pacific Desert Lines (N scale). Based on a rail line that was surveyed but never built, this 1,200 sq ft (110 m^{2}) layout features handlaid Code 40 track (0.040 inches - 1 mm high) and 33 scale miles (1,089 actual feet - 331 m) of mainline track.
- San Diego & Arizona Eastern RR (HO scale). This 4,500 sq ft (420 m^{2}) layout is based on the prototype San Diego and Arizona Eastern Railway line from San Diego Union Station eastward through Carriso Gorge to the desert floor at El Centro.
- Tehachapi Pass (HO scale). This two-level layout represents the joint Southern Pacific / Santa Fe railroad from Bakersfield to Mojave, California, of the 1950s, including the Tehachapi Loop. The model is unique for its size and geographic fidelity. Thousands of photographs of the prototype were used to closely model the details of the actual area with nearly curve-for-curve and switch-for-switch accuracy.
- Toy Train Gallery (3-Rail O gauge). A 42 by 44 foot permanent layout that has four separate main lines, realistic scenery, and many operating accessories. Club members control the trains with modern remote control systems such as LEGACY by Lionel and DCS by MTH. This gallery features operating toy trains of "Lionel type" 3-Rail O gauge, a collection of rare Lionel and American Flyer cars from the 1920s though the 1950s, and modern toy trains from Lionel, MTH, K-Line, and Atlas-O. There is also an interactive kids layout where children of all ages can push a button to run a train.
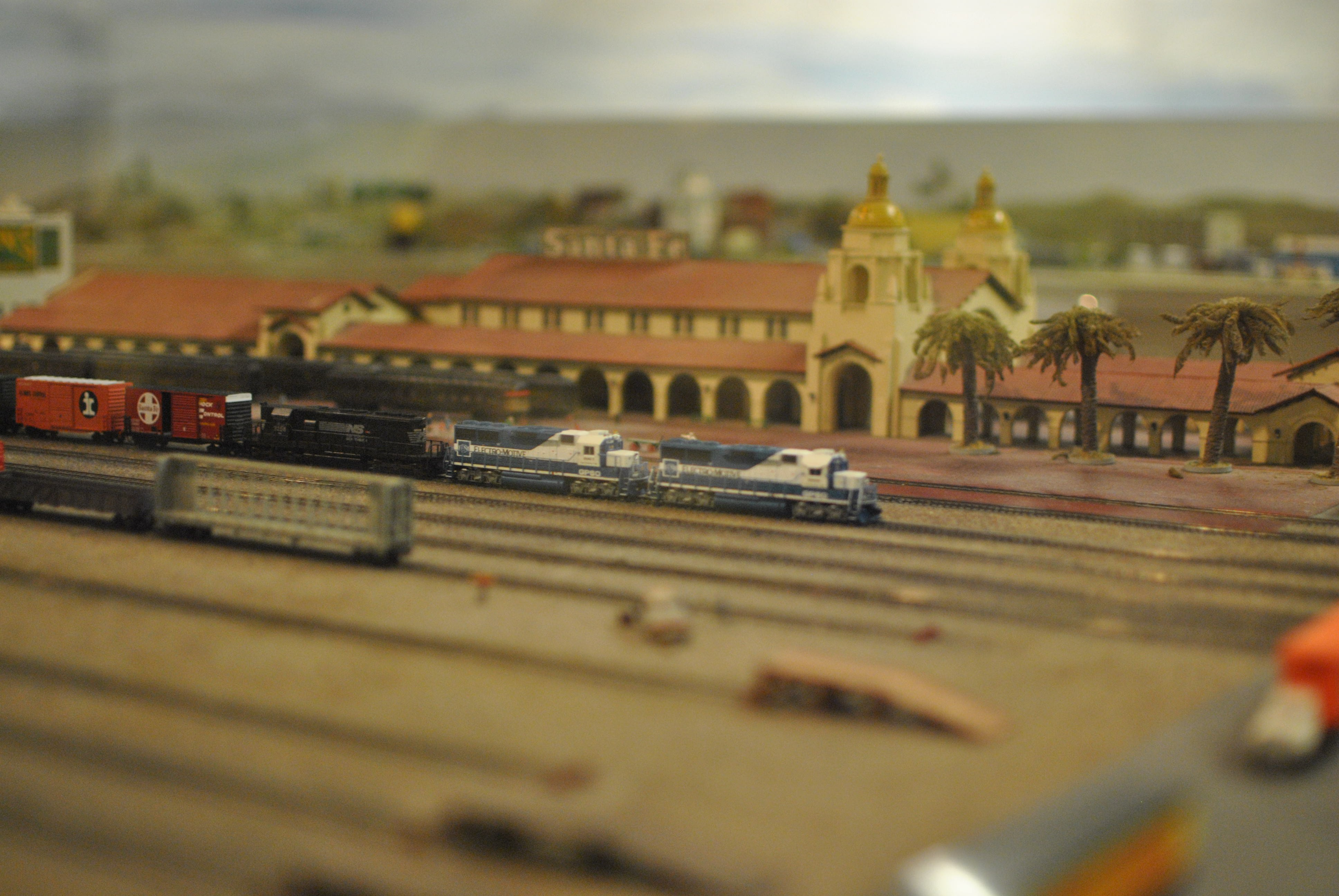
  A model of the San Diego Union Station at the San Diego Model Railroad Museum along with a number of model trains.
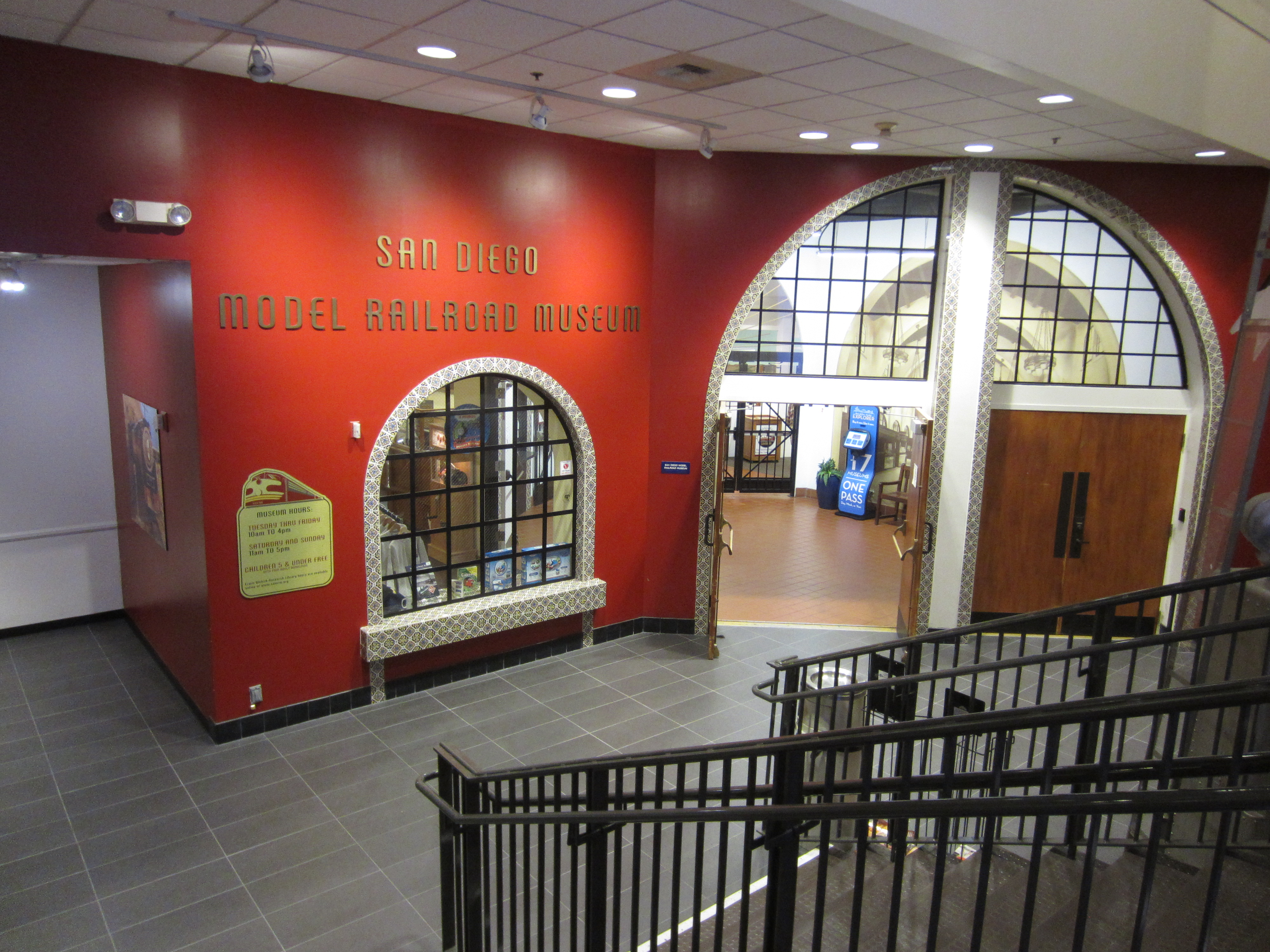
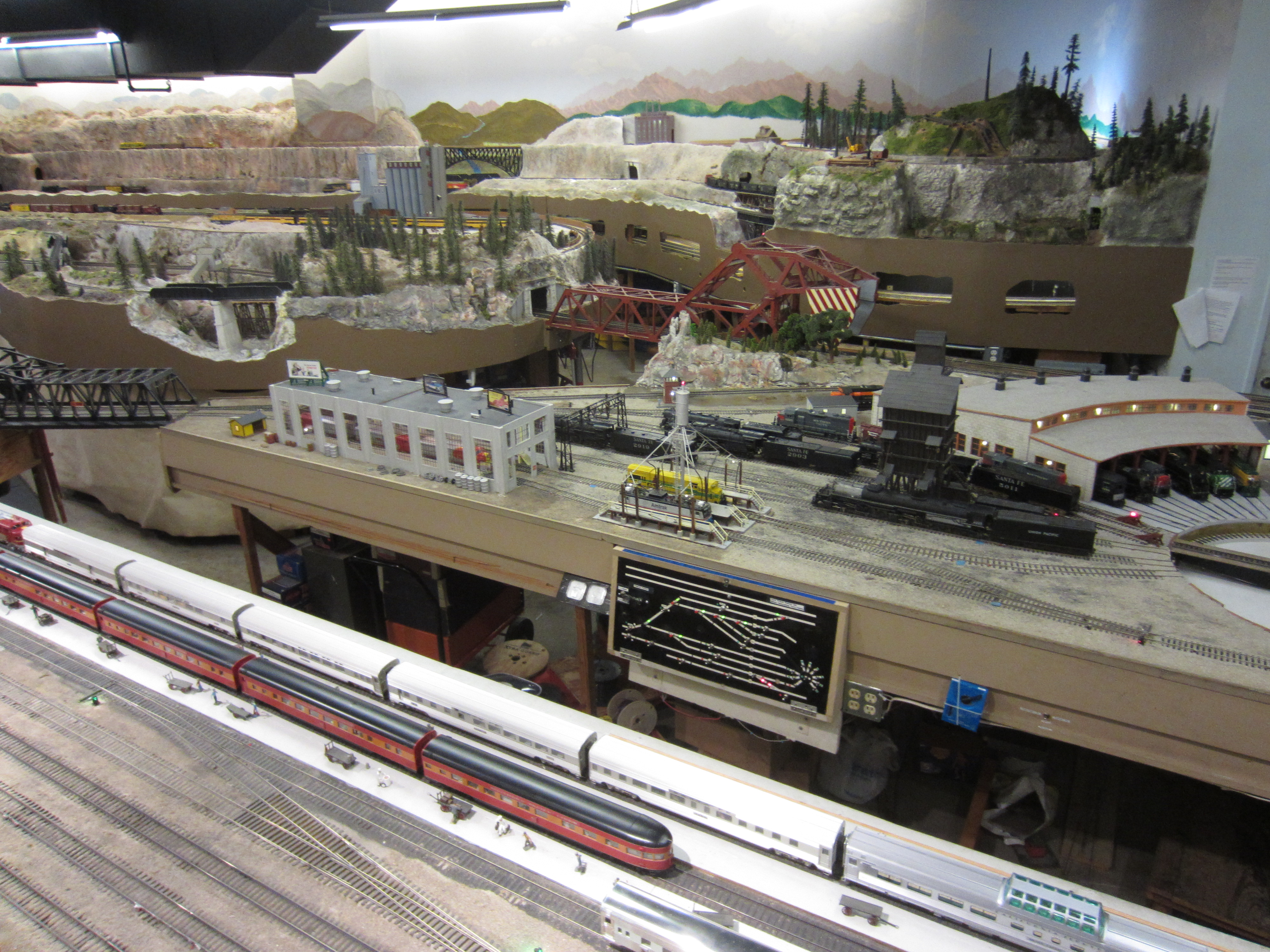
  Model from the San Diego Model Railroad Museum
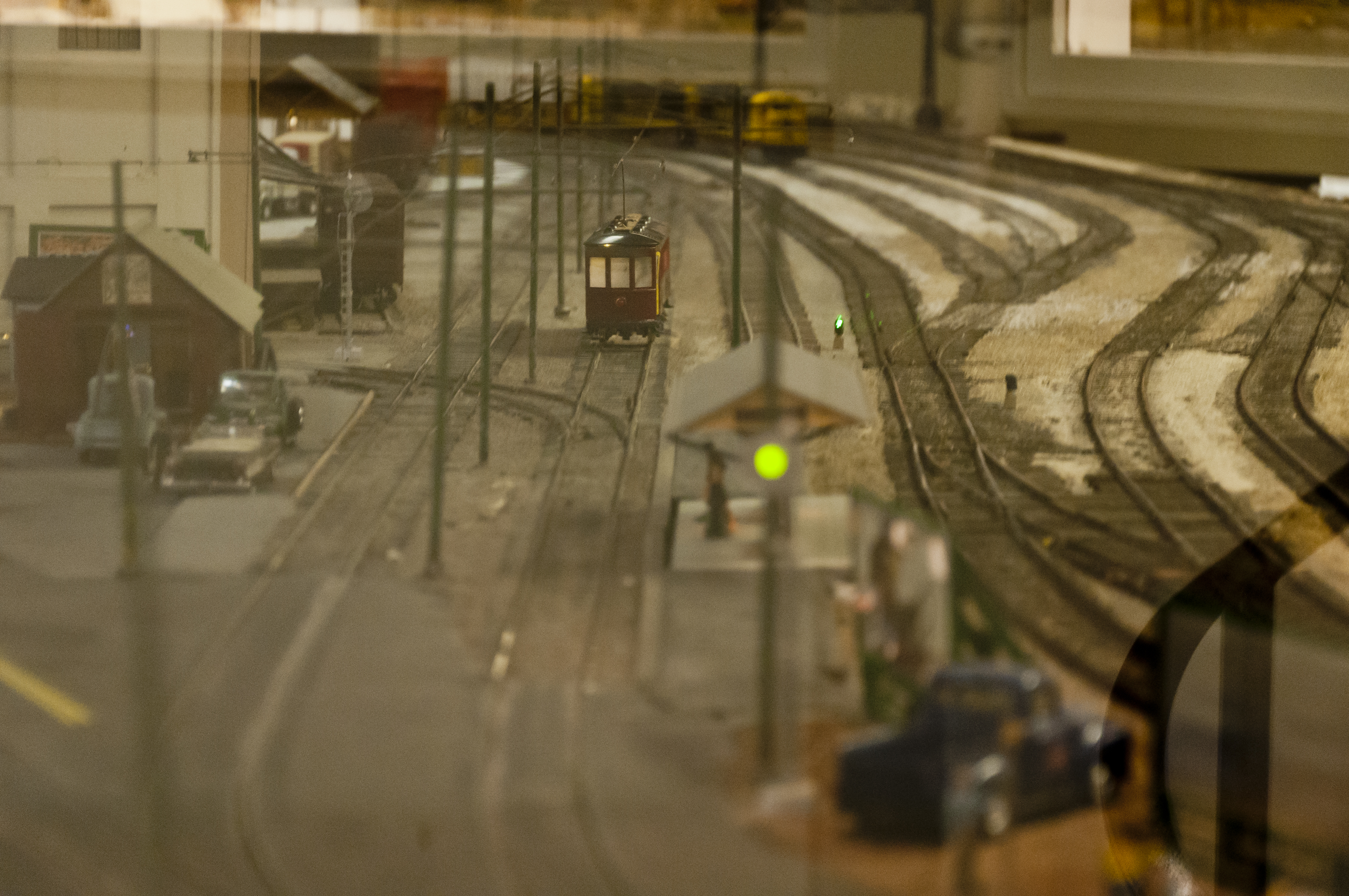
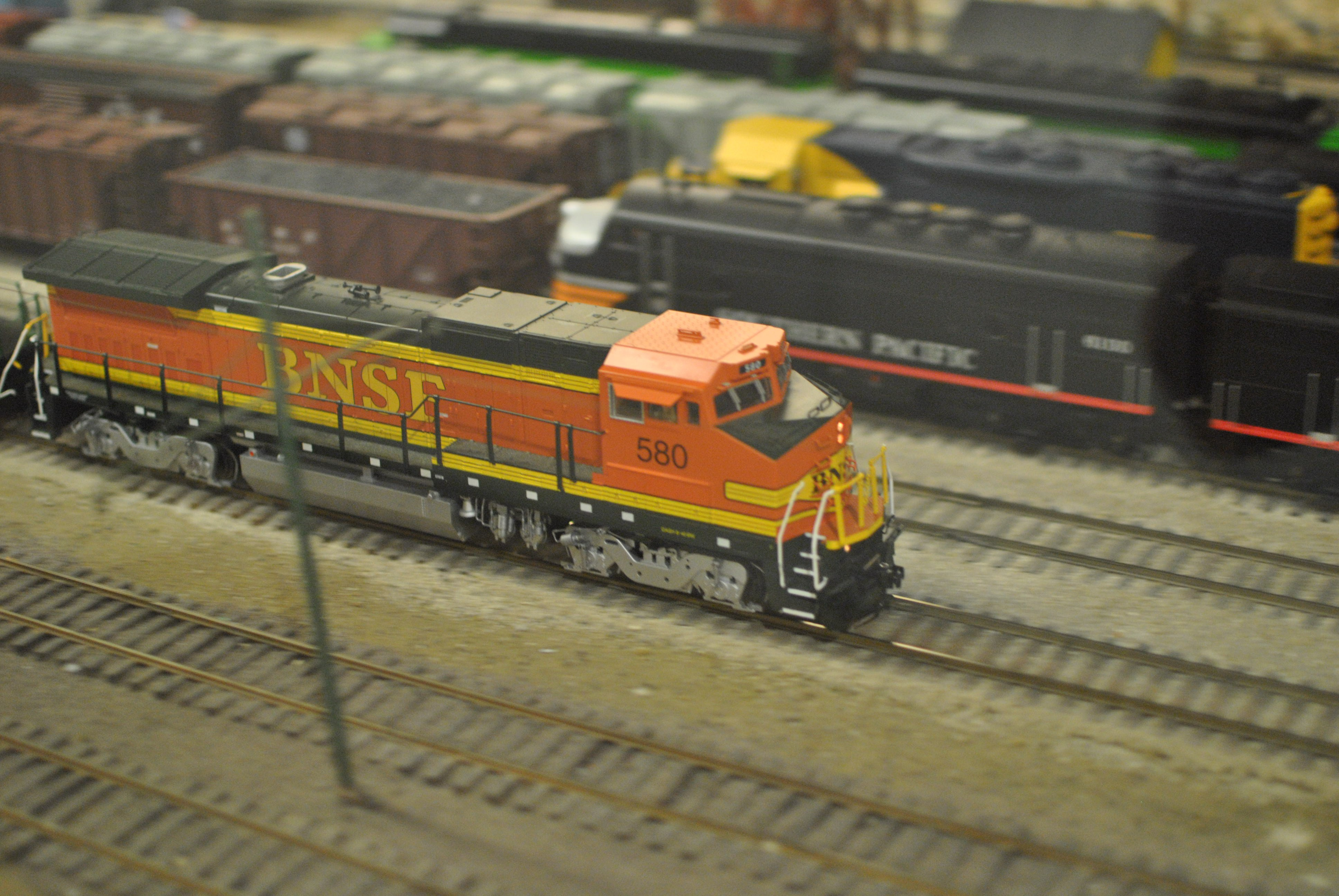
  BNSF Locomotive at San Diego Model Railroad Museum.
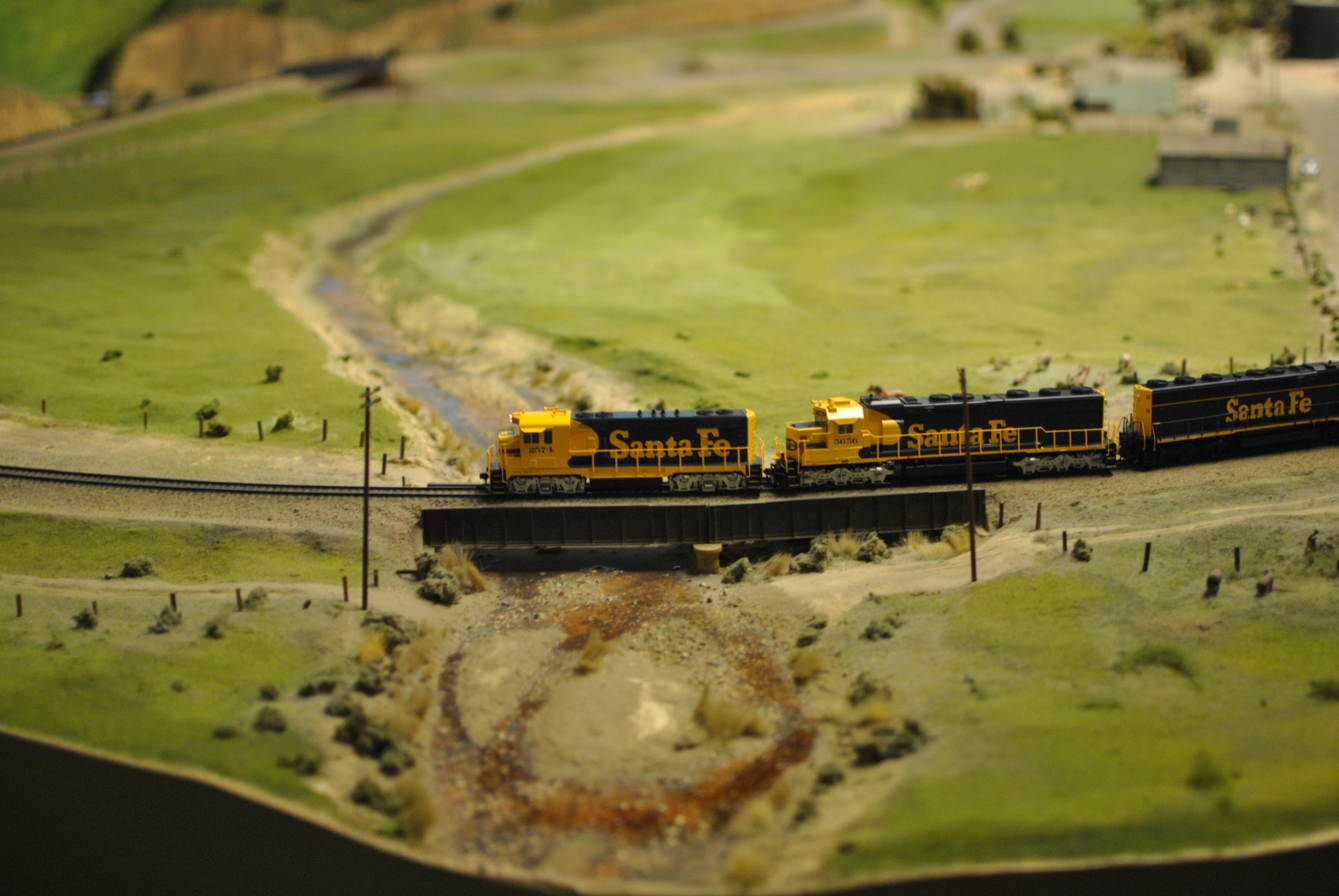
  Santa Fe Line at San Diego Model Railroad Museum.

== Library ==
The museum has a specialized library related to both model railroading and real railroads. The library has a collection of books, magazines, VHS tapes, blueprints and other materials for research. It is a reference library and the materials do not circulate, but it is open for any attendee of the museum.

== Railroad clubs ==
The model railroads were built and are maintained by four local railroad clubs, which exhibit their respective displays as nonprofit organizations. The clubs are:

- San Diego Model Railroad Association, formally, The San Diego Model Railroad Club
- La Mesa Model Railroad Club
- San Diego Society of N-Scale
- San Diego 3-Railers

== See also ==
- List of railway museums
