= Thorp (surname) =

Thorp is a surname, and may refer to:

- Angie Thorp (born 1972), British hurdler and sprinter
- Ash Thorp (born 1983), American illustrator and graphic designer
- Bert D. Thorp (1869–1937), American politician
- Callum Thorp (born 1975), Australian cricketer
- Carl Thorp (1912–1989), American artist
- Charles Thorp (1784–1862), English churchman, Archdeacon of Durham
- Charles Thorp (cricketer) (1882–1953), English cricketer
- David Thorp (born 1947), British artist and independent curator
- Don Thorp (born 1962), American football player
- Edward O. Thorp (born 1932), American mathematician and hedge fund manager
- Eline Thorp (born 1993), Norwegian singer and songwriter
- Freddie Thorp (born 1994), British actor
- George Thorp (Royal Navy officer) (1777–1797), British naval officer of the French Revolutionary Wars
- Hamilton Thorp (born 1973), Australian soccer player
- Herman Thorp (1809–1892), American farmer and politician from Wisconsin
- Holden Thorp (born 1964), American chemist, academic and entrepreneur
- James Thorp (1937–2018), American electrical engineer
- Jer Thorp (born 1974/5), Canadian data artist
- John Thorp (colonial administrator) (1912–1961), British Governor of Seychelles
- John Thorp (engineer) (1912–1992), American aeronautical engineer and designer
- John Thorp (physician) (born 1950s), American obstetrician-gynecologist
- John S. Thorp Jr. (1925–1995), American politician from New York State
- Joseph G. Thorp (1812–1895), American lumber baron and politician from Wisconsin
- Julia Lee-Thorp (born 1951), South African archaeologist and academic
- Lin Thorp (born 1953), Australian politician
- Linton Thorp (1884–1950), British politician and judge
- Mandana Coleman Thorp (1843-1916), American Civil War nurse with the Union Army and singer
- Margaret Thorp (1892–1978), Australian peace and labour activist
- Margaret Farrand Thorp (1891–1970), American writer, journalist and academic
- Marius Thorp (born 1988), Norwegian golfer
- Mary Tucker Thorp (1899–1974), American school principal
- Mitch Thorp (born 1988), Australian rules footballer
- N. Howard Thorp (Nathan Howard Thorp) (1867–1940), American collector and writer of cowboy songs and poetry
- Nicola Thorp (born 1988), English actress, broadcaster and activist
- Paul Thorp (born 1964), English motorcycle speedway rider
- Philip Thorp (1911–2006), English cricketer
- Prescott Holden Thorp (1887–1981), American stamp dealer
- Richard Thorp (1932–2013), English actor
- Robert Thorp (Indian Army officer) (1838–1868), author of Kashmir Misgovernment
- Robert Thorp (MP) (1900–1966), Englis politician
- Robert Thorp (priest) (1736–1812), British cleric, Archdeacon of Northumberland
- Robert Taylor Thorp (1850–1938), American politician from Virginia
- Roderick Thorp (1936–1999), American novelist
- Samuel Thorp (c.1765–1838), English clockmaker
- John Kingsmill Thorp, governor of Seychelles and Saint Lucia
- Thomas Thorp (judge) (1925–2018), New Zealand lawyer, jurist and judge
- Thomas Thorp (priest) (1797–1877), English Anglican priest, Archdeacon of Bristol
- Thomas Thorp (scientific instrument manufacturer) (1850–1914), English manufacturer and inventor of a gas meter
- Tom Thorp (1884–1942), American football player and coach, and sports writer
- Vic Thorp (1890–1941), Australian rules footballer
- Will Thorp (born 1977), English actor
- Willard Thorp (1899–1992), American economist and academic

== See also ==
- Thorpe (surname)
