= Rose Schneider =

American painter (1895–1976)

- Born: October 15, 1895; La Grange, Missouri, United States
- Died: February 20, 1976 (aged 80); San Diego, California, United States
- Other names: Sadie Rose Schneider, Sara Rose Schneider
- Occupation: Painter
- Years active: 1920s–1950

Rose Schneider (October 15, 1895 – February 20, 1976) was an American painter, known for her California landscapes. She lived in San Diego, California for most of her life.

== Biography ==
Rose Schneider was born on October 15, 1895, in La Grange, Missouri. In 1898, when she was child, her family moved to San Diego, California, where she later attended San Diego High School. Schneider studied painting under Maurice Braun and Charles Reiffel.

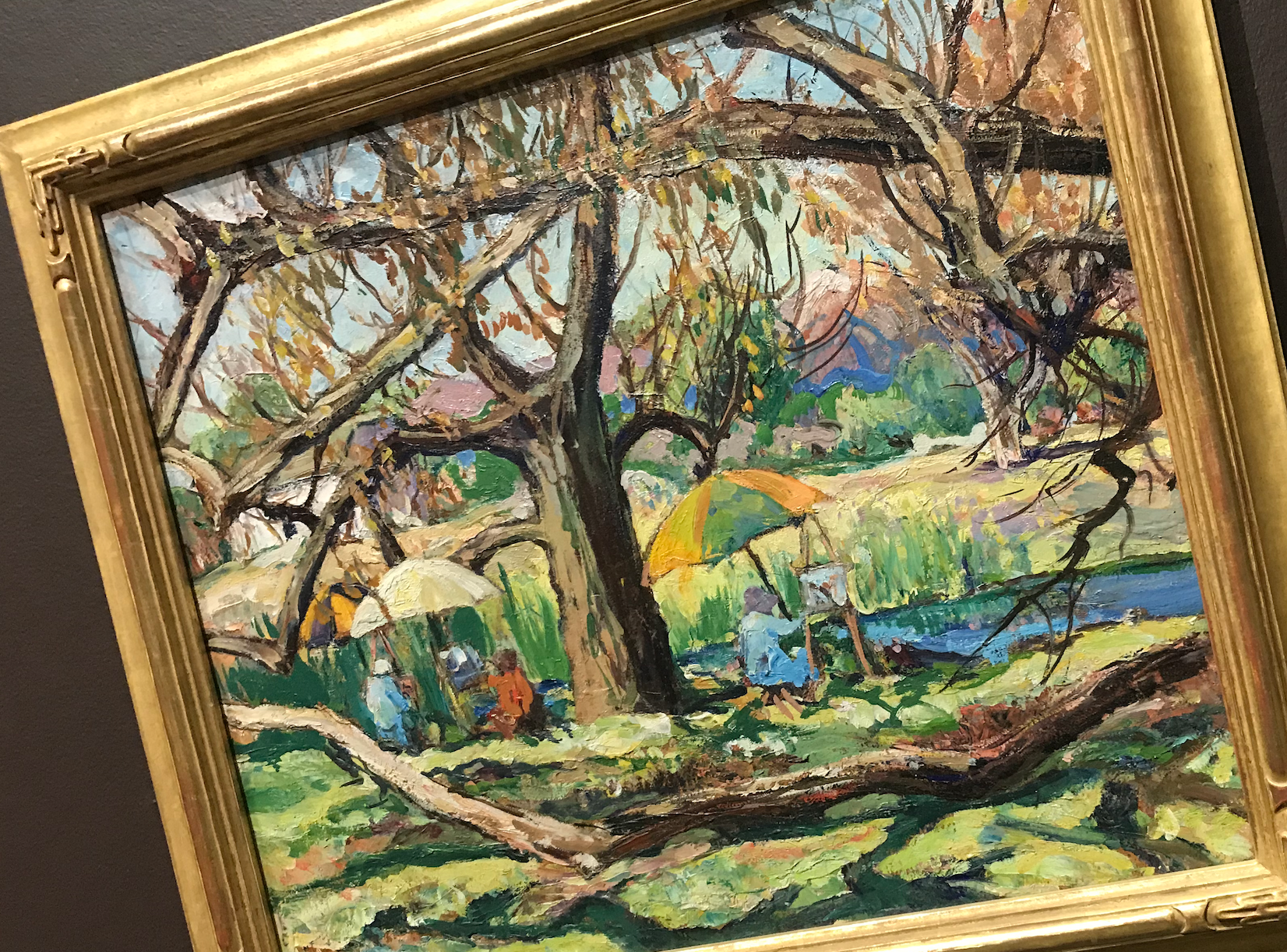
Untitled--Artists Painting In Nature circa 1935.

Schneider was a member of the San Diego Art Guild. In 1934, she won a second prize award for the painting, Approaching Storm at the California State Fair in Sacramento. One of her paintings was exhibited in 1935 at the California Pacific International Exposition, in San Diego, California; and in 1939 at the Golden Gate International Exposition in San Francisco.

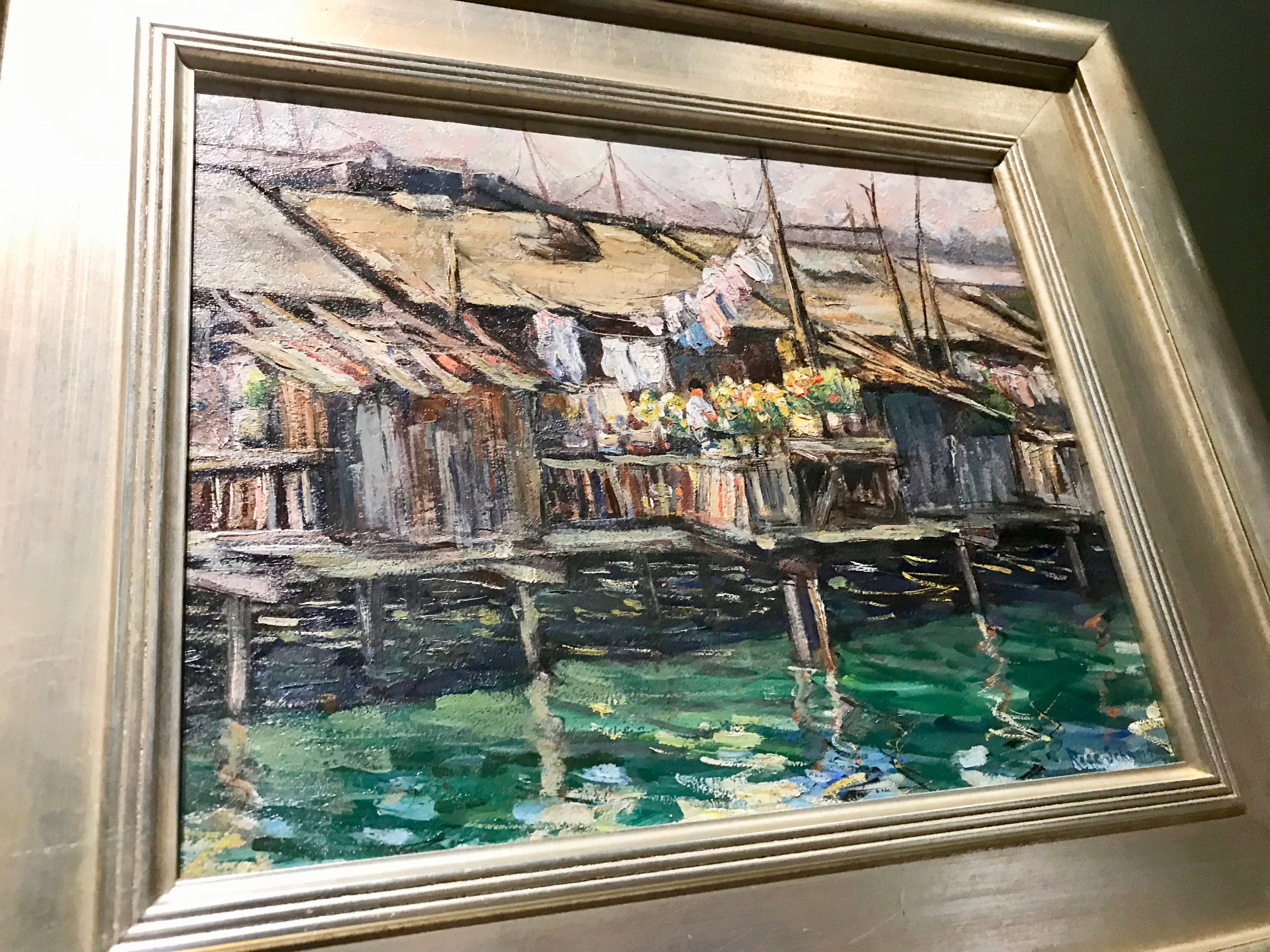
Untitled--Fishing Shack San Diego Harbor circa 1935 by Rose Schneider

Schneider died at the age of 80 on February 20, 1976, in San Diego, California. She is profiled in the Edan Milton Hughes' book, Artists in California, 1786–1940 (1989).
