= Casa de Balboa =

Building in San Diego, California, U.S.

Coordinates: 32.7311°N 117.1487°W

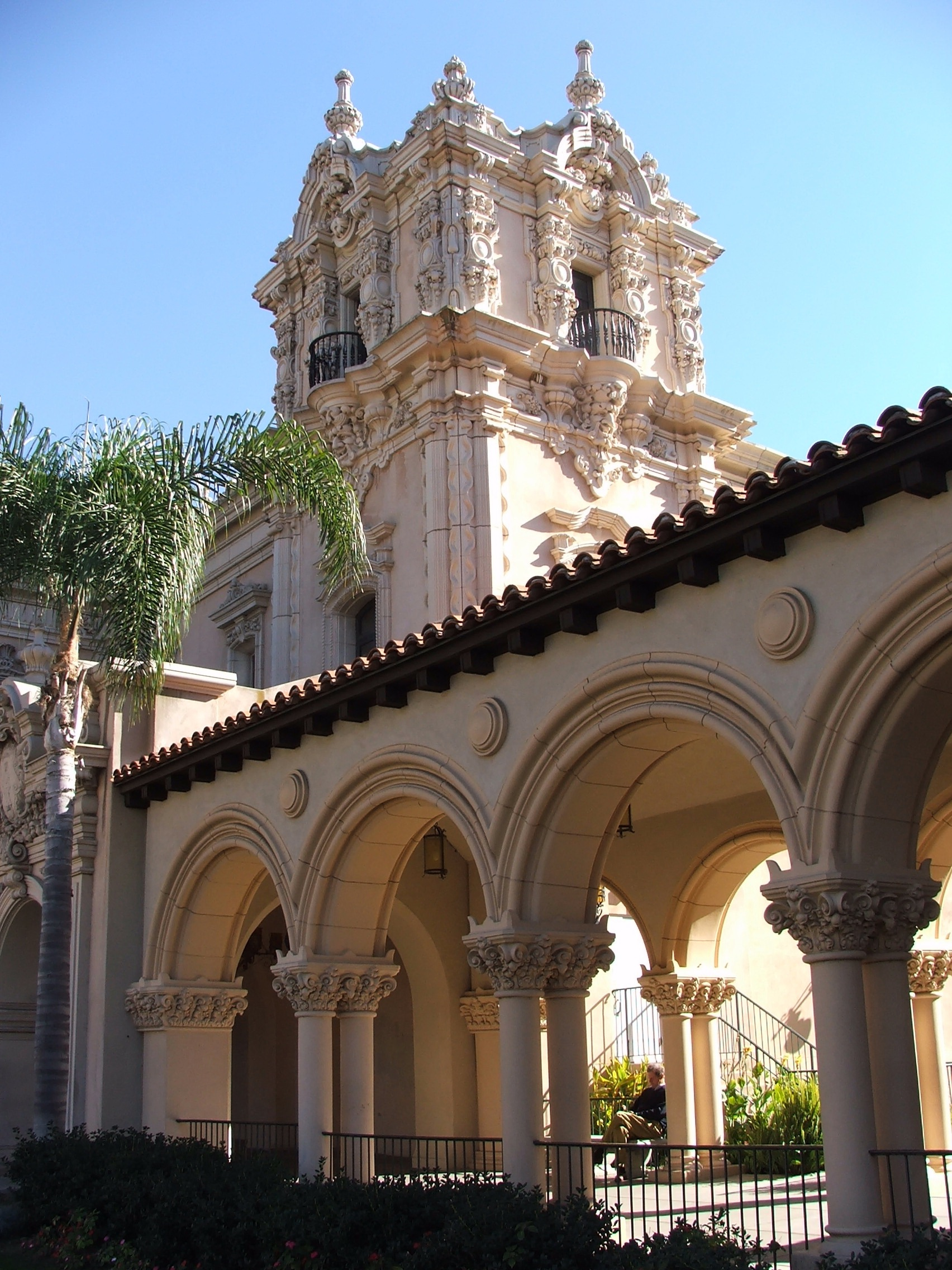
- The Casa de Balboa in 2004
- Interactive map of the Casa de Balboa area

General information
- Type: Exhibition building / Museum complex
- Architectural style: Spanish Colonial Revival
- Location: Balboa Park, San Diego, California, United States
- Current tenants: Museum of Photographic Arts; San Diego History Center; San Diego Model Railroad Museum; Balboa Art Conservation Center
- Opened: 1915
- Renovated: 1970s (post-fire reconstruction)
- Owner: City of San Diego

Website
- City of San Diego – Balboa Park Facilities

The Casa de Balboa is a building in Balboa Park in San Diego, California. The building was originally known as the Commerce and Industries Building, and later called the Canadian Building, the Palace of Better Housing, and the Electric Building. It is currently home to the Museum of Photographic Arts, San Diego History Center, San Diego Model Railroad Museum, and the Balboa Art Conservation Center.
