= Charles Arthur Fries =

American painter

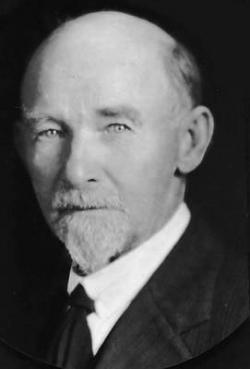
- Portrait of Charles Arthur Fries
- Born: August 14, 1854; Hillsboro, Ohio, U.S.
- Died: December 15, 1940; San Diego, California, U.S.

Charles Arthur Fries (1854-1940) was an American painter active in Cincinnati and San Diego in the late nineteenth and early twentieth century. He is especially noted for his Impressionistic landscape paintings of southern California deserts and seascapes.

== Biography ==
Fries was born in Hillsboro, Ohio on August 14, 1854 and raised in Cincinnati. He was the seventh of eleven children born to John and Martha Fries.

In 1872, at the age of 18, Fries began an apprenticeship as a lithographer at Gibson and Company in Cincinnati. In 1874 he began working as a photographer and lithographer for the Cincinnati Commercial Gazette. In that same year he also began attending night classes at the McMicken School of Design, which later became the Art Academy of Cincinnati.

From 1874 until 1890 Fries worked for various publications as an illustrator, photographer, and lithographer in the Cincinnati area. In 1887 he married Addie Davis and in 1890 the couple bought a small farm in Waitsfield, Vermont, where they lived for six years.

In 1896 Charles, Addie and their six-year-old daughter Alice left Vermont and moved to California. After a brief stay at Mission San Juan Capistrano, the family finally settled in San Diego in 1897 and Charles remained a resident of San Diego for the remainder of his life.

During his career he took many extended camping trips into the deserts and mountains of southern California where he sketched and painted many of his works.

Fries prospered as the city grew and he exhibited widely, including shows in New York, San Francisco, and Berkeley. He was an active member of the arts community of San Diego for many years. In 1918 he was a founding member of the La Jolla Art Association, along with other prominent San Diego artists, including Maurice Braun and Alfred Mitchell. In 1919 he was elected president of the San Diego Art Guild. In 1929 he was a founder of the Associated Artists of San Diego.

In 1936, at the age of 82, Fries made one final sketching trip into the mountains east of San Diego and in 1937 he participated in the Federal Art Project. Charles Fries died at home on December 15, 1940.

== Paintings by Charles Fries ==
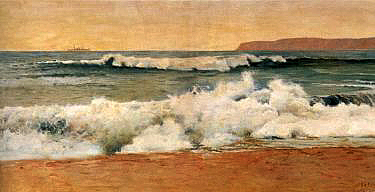
San Diego Bay, 1904

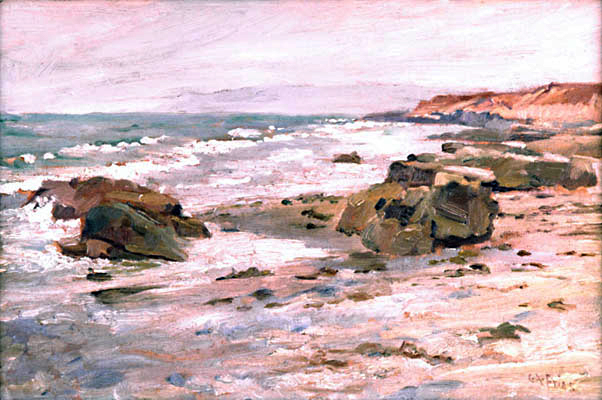
Rocks at Ocean Beach, 1910

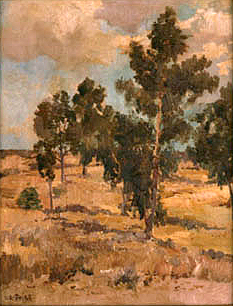
Eucalyptus Grove-Balboa Park, 1910

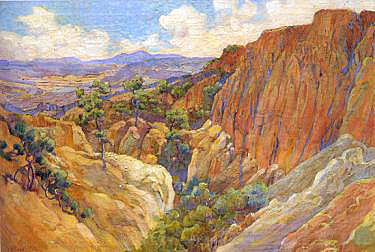
Painted Gorge at Torrey Pines, 1919

== Galleries and public collections ==
- Steven Stern Fine Arts, Beverly Hills, California
- Laguna Art Museum, Laguna Beach, California
- Irvine Museum, Irvine, California
- San Diego Museum of Art, San Diego, California
- Corcoran Gallery of Art, Washington, DC
- K. Nathan Gallery, La Jolla, California
