= Norman Baynard =

American photographer

- Born: April 10, 1908; Pontiac, Michigan
- Died: January 9, 1986 (aged 77); San Diego, California, United States
- Known for: Photography

Norman Baynard (1908–1986) was an American photographer whose work documented the social and civic life of African-Americans in the Logan Heights neighborhood of San Diego from the 1940s through the 1980s. His extensive collection of negatives and prints, donated to the San Diego History Center in 1991, became the basis for an oral history and photograph identification project that chronicled the African-American experience in San Diego through engagement with local citizens.

== Biography ==
Baynard was born on April 10, 1908, in Pontiac, Michigan, to Canadian immigrants John and Minnie (née Chandler) Baynard. His parents divorced in his youth, and Baynard moved with his father to California in the early 1920s. Throughout the 1930s, he worked in a variety of jobs, including gardener and musician. For two years he worked for the aircraft company Consolidated Aircraft (later known as Convair) in the photography developing section. He married Frances H. (née Barnett) Russ in 1936. She encouraged him to take up photography, and in 1939, he opened the N. B. Studio in their home on Clay Avenue in the Logan Heights neighborhood. Later the studio moved to the business district of Imperial Avenue and was renamed the Baynard Studio. (Note: Baynard changed his name to Mansour Abdullah in 1976; thereafter, his photography studio was known as Abdullah's Photo Studio.)

Baynard died on January 9, 1986, in San Diego, California.

== Photography ==
Baynard's commercial photography was primarily in portraiture. During a 46-year career, he documented the social, political, and religious life of residents of the Logan Heights neighborhood of San Diego, photographing community groups, businesses, and life events (baptisms, graduations, weddings). His body of work – some 12,000 images – represents a unique record of the African-American community in San Diego in the mid-20th century, showing both a broad range of subject and a "specific focus on the ‘California Dream’" characteristic of Baynard's upwardly-mobile clients.

In 2011, the San Diego History Center presented the exhibition, Portrait of a Proud Community: Norman Baynard's Logan Heights 1939–1985, which showcased 120 photographs from the collection. A National Endowment for the Arts grant and other funding enabled the museum to digitize and catalog 500 images from the Norman Baynard Collection.
