= Dog licence =

Licence to keep a dog required in some jurisdictions

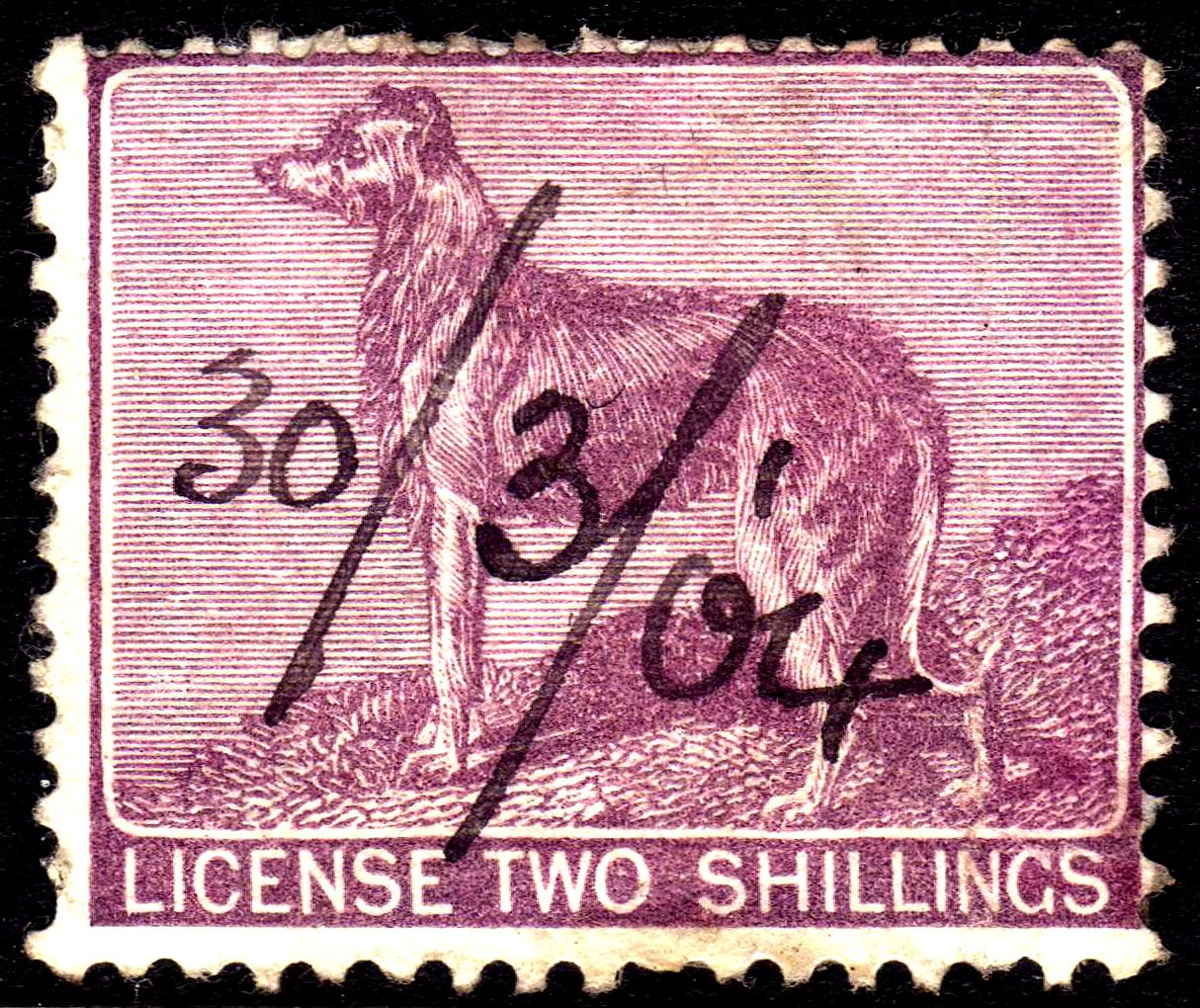
An Irish dog licence revenue stamp used in 1904 and showing an Irish Wolfhound

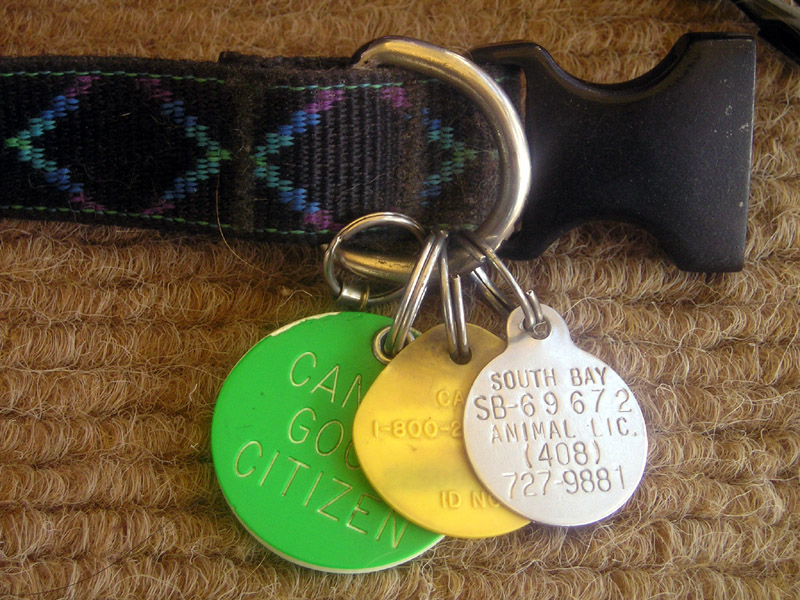
The dog licence tag might be one of several dog tags worn.

A dog licence is required in some jurisdictions to be the keeper of a dog. Usually a dog-licence identifying number is issued to the owner, along with a dog tag bearing the identifier and a contact number for the registering organization. If a stray pet is found with the tag, a rescuer can call the registering organization to get current contact information for the animal.

Licensing a dog might require additional actions on the owner's part, such as ensuring that the dog has a current rabies vaccination or passing a dog obedience test. In many jurisdictions a fee, which is usually small, must be paid. Licences typically must be renewed annually or after some small number of years.

== Licensing information worldwide ==
=== Australia ===
Dog licences are mandated by state and territory legislation but are issued by local governments (e.g., city or shire councils). Hence the cost of a licence and the format of the licence tag vary across the country. Some areas, such as Victoria, require cat registration and microchipping also.

=== Germany ===
Most municipalities raise a tax for dogs which is paid on a yearly basis. In some municipalities subsequent dogs are taxed higher to discourage owning too many.

=== India ===
India does not have any pan-India law for dog licences, but pet owners can get their dogs registered with the local municipal authorities based on their city and state. One can also register their dog with the Kennel Club of India (KCI). The KCI provides registration for all pet dogs in India.

Incidents of animal abuse and dog bites have made it difficult for dog owners to convince resident welfare associations to permit them to live with their dogs.

=== Ireland ===
Dog licences are required. There are three types of licence:

- Individual dog licence – covers one dog for a period of 12 months
- General dog licence – for owners of kennels for a period of 12 months
- Lifetime of the dog licence – for the lifetime of the dog for which the licence is issued

=== Italy ===
Since 2008 an identification microchip is mandatory for each dog over 2 months, and a small fee is associated with it, but it does not need to be renewed.

=== Luxembourg ===
Under Luxembourgish law, dog owners must register each of their dogs with the local authorities and pay an annual dog tax of minimum €10 per dog (each municipality sets the amount). Service dogs are exempt from this annual tax, as are dogs belonging to the Luxembourg police, the army and customs agencies.

=== Netherlands ===
Dogs must be registered and a yearly tax is paid to the municipality based on the number of dogs. The amount differs between municipalities; Some municipalities, such as the Hague (as of 2024) and Amsterdam, have abolished this tax.

=== New Zealand ===
Under the Dog Control Act 1996 all dogs over three months old are required to be registered with the city or district council the dog usually resides in. As a prerequisite, all dogs classified as dangerous or menacing, and all dogs first registered in New Zealand after 1 July 2006 must be microchipped before they can be registered.

All dog registrations expire yearly on 30 June, and must be renewed by 31 July. Each registered dog must wear a tag specifying the council, registration expiry date, and registration number of the dog, with the colour of the tag changing every year for easy identification (e.g. tags for the 2013–14 year are red). Fees for registration differ between councils, and also differ according to factors such as whether the dog is neutered, living in an urban or rural area, classed as dangerous or menacing, and whether the owner is a responsible dog owner. Fees for working dogs (herding dogs, police dogs, drug dogs, etc.) are generally lower than for pets, and seeing-eye or hearing-ear dogs are generally free or minimal cost to register.

=== United Kingdom ===
Dog Licences Act 1867 (Note: The citation of this act by this short title was authorised by section 1 of, and the first schedule to, the Short Titles Act 1896. Due to the repeal of those provisions it is now authorised by section 19(2) of the Interpretation Act 1978.)
- Act of Parliament
- Parliament of the United Kingdom
- Long title: An Act to repeal the Duties of Assessed Taxes on Dogs, and to impose in lieu thereof a Duty of Excise.
- Citation: 30 & 31 Vict. c. 5
- Territorial extent: England and Wales; Scotland; (Note: Section 1.)

Dates
- Royal assent: 29 March 1867
- Commencement: England and Wales: 5 April 1867; Scotland: 24 May 1867
- Repealed: 16 October 1959
Other legislation
Amends	Land Tax Redemption (Investment) Act 1853
Amended by	Statute Law Revision Act 1875
Repealed by	Dog Licences Act 1959

Status: Repealed

Text of statute as originally enacted

In England, Wales and Scotland, dog licensing was abolished by the Local Government Act 1988. Prior to this dog licences were mandatory under the Dog Licences Act 1959 (7 & 8 Eliz. 2. c. 55), having been originally introduced by the Dog Licences Act 1867 (30 & 31 Vict. c. 5) but the requirement was widely ignored, with only about half of owners having one. The final rate for a dog licence was 37 pence, reduced from 37½p when the halfpenny was withdrawn in 1984. This figure was an exact conversion from the rate of seven shillings and sixpence set in the Customs and Inland Revenue Act 1878. The revenue went to local authorities. The term has found its way in golf, where a 7 and 6 win in golf is referred as a "dog licence" owing to the historical cost as set in 1878.

In 2016 it became a requirement that all dogs in England and Wales have a microchip; Scottish legislation was also changed to make microchipping of dogs compulsory from 2016.

In Northern Ireland, dog licences are required under the Dogs (Northern Ireland) Order 1983. As of October 2011 dog licences cost £12.50 a year, with reductions for pensioners and owners of neutered dogs.

==== Bailiwick of Guernsey ====
Dog owners in Guernsey are required to pay dog tax each year for each dog owned.

==== Isle of Man ====
Dog licences were abolished on 1 April 2018.

=== United States ===
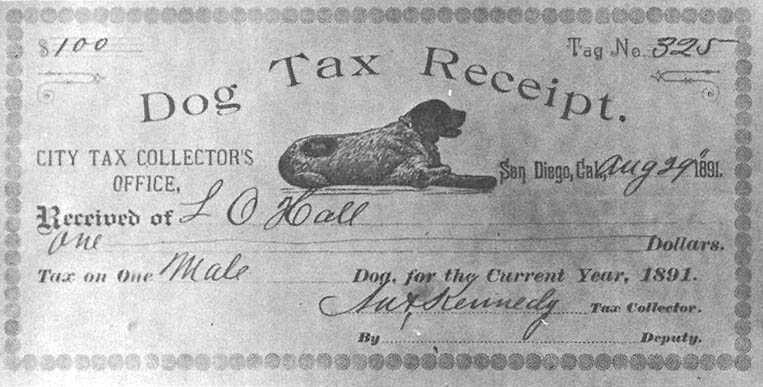
The earliest San Diego dog licenses included an image of a local dog named Bum.

At least some states, municipalities, and other jurisdictions require a dog licence and rabies vaccination, and a licence expires before the vaccine does. To prevent animal overpopulation, some jurisdictions charge a lower licensing fee if the owner presents veterinary proof that the dog has been spayed or neutered. Some parts of California and Maryland require cat licences.

An effort was made in 2012 to repeal the requirement for dog licenses in the state of New Hampshire. The effort did not succeed at the time due in part to testimony provided by the son of the chair of the committee who was a veterinarian testifying against the bill. Funds from the tax for dog licenses go towards the state veterinarian.
