= Edward H. Davis =

Edward Harvey Davis
- Davis in 1912.
- Born: June 18, 1862; New York
- Died: February 22, 1951 (aged 88); San Bernardino, California
- Occupation: Museum field collector

Edward Harvey Davis (1862-1951) was a field collector for the Museum of the American Indian in New York City who acquired many artifacts from various indigenous groups in San Diego county and northwestern Mexico (including the Seris) for that museum (now part of the Smithsonian).

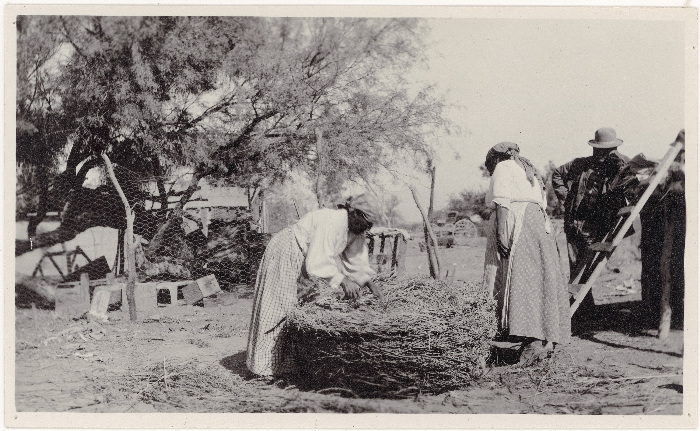
Desert Cahuilla, 1917.

== Biography ==
Born to Lewis S. Davis and Christine Smith Davis on 18 June 1862 in New York, Davis grew up in Brooklyn and attended the Brooklyn Art Guild, developing skills in drawing and drafting. He worked for a time in New York in the accounting office of his family's shipping firm, Jonas Smith & Company.

In 1885, ill with Bright’s disease, Davis followed his older brother Henry to San Diego, where the elder Davis had established an office of the family shipping firm and expanded into lumber and mining interests. The younger Davis found work as a surveyor and a draftsman, drawing maps and house plans. In 1887, he helped draw plans for the Hotel del Coronado.

In 1885, he married Anna Marion (Anna May) Wells in New York and returned with her to San Diego.

In 1887, a real estate deal in downtown San Diego provided Davis the funds to purchase 320 acres in Mesa Grande, approximately 60 miles northeast of San Diego, where he developed the land into a working cattle ranch and fruit farm. In 1915, he built a summer resort on the property, the Powam Lodge, designed by noted architect Emmor Brook Weaver. Davis and his family operated the lodge until 1930, when it was destroyed in a fire.

An interest in Indian culture led Davis to collect Indian artifacts, trading with various tribes in the neighborhood. Concerned with the loss of traditional Indian way of life, Davis acquired extensive artifacts to preserve and document Indian culture.

In 1916, George Gustav Heye, founder of the Museum of the American Indian, hired Davis as a field collector of Indian ethnological specimens. Davis collected for the Heye Foundation from 1917 to 1930, focusing on artifacts of the Indian tribes of San Diego County/Southern California, Arizona, New Mexico, and northwestern Mexico, including the Paipai, Kiliwa, Cora, Huichol, Opata, Mayo, Seri, Apache, Cocopa, Tohono O’odham, Papago, Maricopa, Mojave, Hualapai, Yaqui, and Yuma Indians.

In addition to collecting, Davis photographed Indian communities, documenting their daily and ceremonial activities and publishing his experiences in both popular magazines and scholarly journals.

Davis died on 22 February 1951 at the age of 89.

== Collections ==
The National Museum of the American Indian houses a large number of objects Davis collected during his years in the Southwest. The San Diego History Center (SDHC) houses the Edward H. Davis Collection of Indian Photographs and Drawings (5000 images, most dating from 1903 to 1947);. Additionally, the SDHC Archives holds Davis's 62 notebooks and pages of field notes. The bulk of his papers are housed at Cornell University Library (Edward H. Davis Papers, 1910-1944, Collection no. 9166).

== Selected publications ==
- Davis, Edward H. Early Cremation Ceremonies of the Luiseño and Diegueño Indians of Southern California. New York: Museum of the American Indian, Heye Foundation, 1921.
- ———. “The Diegueño Ceremony of the Death Images.” Contributions from the Museum of the American Indian, Heye Foundation 5, no. 2 (1919): 1–33.
- ———. The Papago Ceremony of Víkĭta. New York: Museum of the American Indian, Heye Foundation, 1920.
- Davis, Edward H., and E. Yale Dawson. “The Savage Seris of Sonora--I.” The Scientific Monthly 60, no. 3 (1945): 193–202.
- ———. “The Savage Seris of Sonora--II.” The Scientific Monthly 60, no. 4 (1945): 261–68.
