= Pet tag =

Identification tag worn by pets

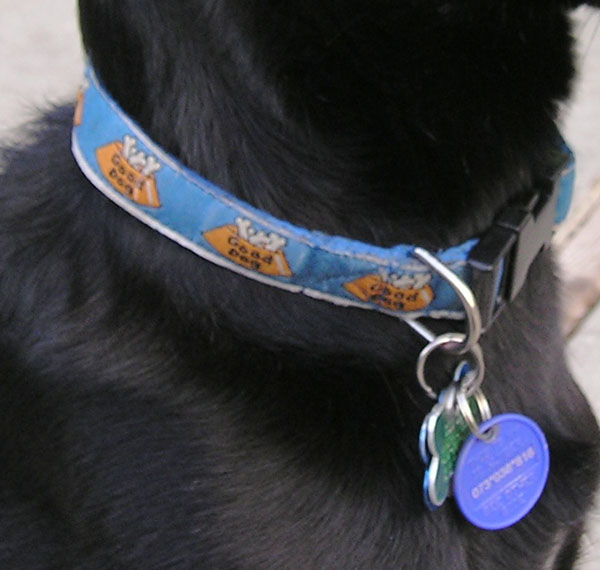
A dog might wear several different identifying dog tags.

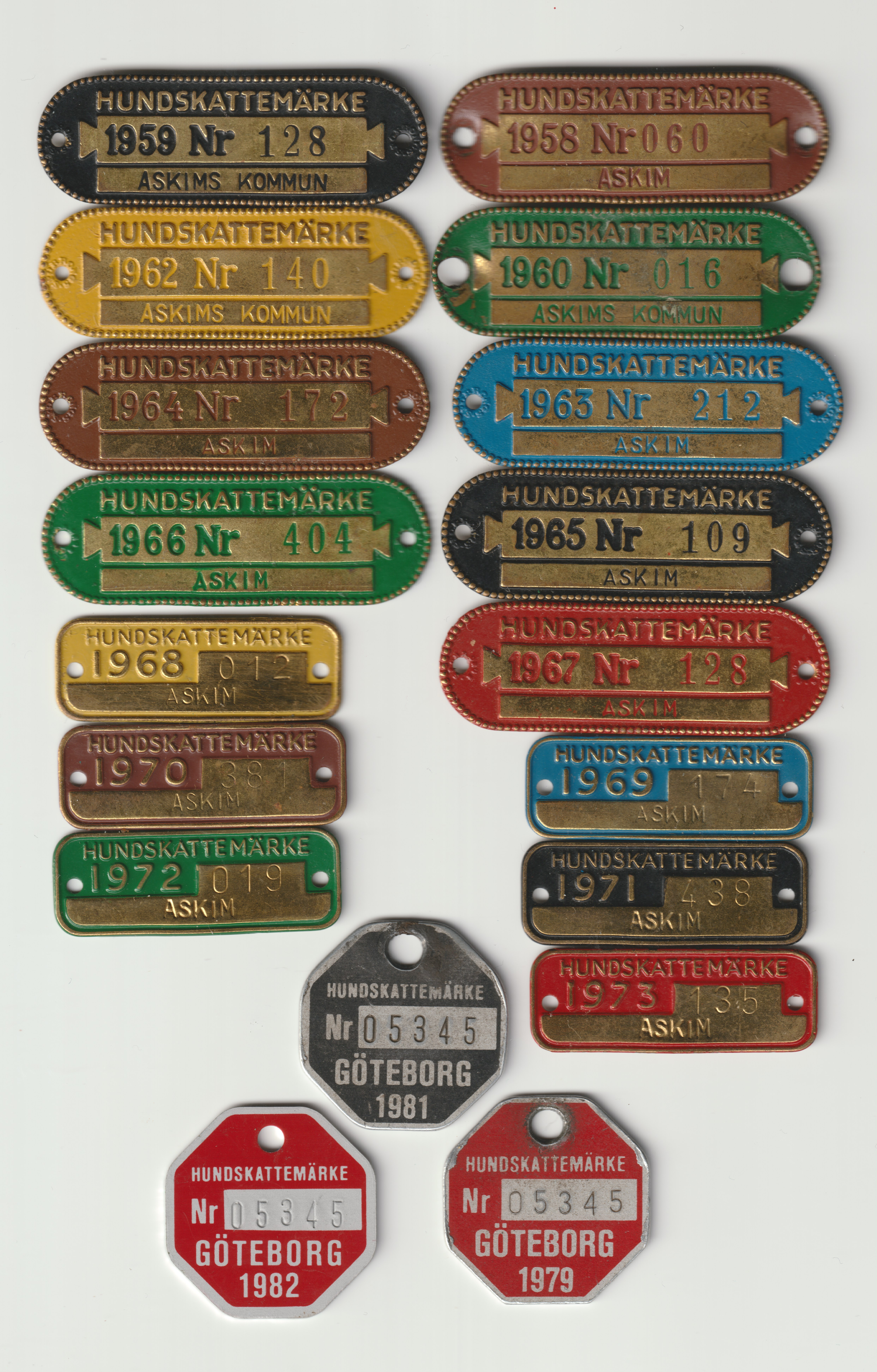
Swedish dog taxation brass/aluminium tags from 1958-1982.

A dog tag, cat tag, pet ID tag, or pet tag is a small flat tag worn on pets' collars or harnesses.

Humane societies and rescue organizations recommend that dogs and cats wear these tags, which present that the wearer is not a stray, and contain information to enable someone encountering a lost pet to contact the owner. In the UK, dog owners are required by law to ensure that their dog is wearing an ID tag, even if the dog has already been microchipped (also required by UK law).

Tags may make noise as animals move. A collar-mount tag, either slide-on or riveted-on flat to a collar's surface, is silent. A tag silencer encloses loose tags in a small neoprene pouch or a soft rubbery plastic ring around the edge of a tag and may reduce noise.

The resemblance of human identification tags to this method of display led to military identification tags being called dog tags.

== Identifying information ==
Identifying information on pet tags may include:

- On a license tag, the dog license number and contact information for the licensing organization
- On a pet ID tag, the pet's name, owner's phone number(s), address, or a QR code pointing to the pet's online profile, a reward offer, and a list of the animal's critical medical problems
- On a microchip registry tag, an identifying number for the dog with a phone number for the registry.

Some organizations recommend not putting a pet's name on an ID tag because, in an ownership dispute over a found dog, the original owner could use the pet's name to demonstrate that the pet recognizes the name and therefore has an association with that owner. Others believe that a lost pet might feel more comfortable and therefore be more likely to approach if strangers call it by its own name, so the name should be on the tag.

== Materials ==
Tags are made of a variety of materials.

Metal tags usually have their information embossed or engraved onto, or stamped into, their surface. The characters created by embossing or engraving are made by removing some of the tag's surface and are not typically as deep as stamped characters, which are made by stamping the tag with a metal die. Stamped tags are therefore often more durable than engraved tags, though some drag-engraving and laser engraving methods can be as deep, or deeper, than the stamped versions.

Plastic chips can be etched or printed, come in many colors, and may be highly reflective to enhance visibility at night. Some plastics are sensitive to ultraviolet light and the color and even composition can fade over time. ABS plastics are among the most durable for use as pet ID tags.

Some tags use dye-sublimation to print images and artwork to aluminum tags. The image is permanent and resists fading and wear. 3D printing is also used to create tags from a variety of materials.

Common metals used for pet tags are aluminum, stainless steel, and brass. Aluminum is by far (2.5 times lighter than stainless steel) the least durable of the three. Brass is a soft metal, and not as durable as any variety of stainless steel. It may also tarnish and turn a greenish color. Harder metals are more likely to retain their lettering after wear and tear.

== See also ==
- Ear tag
- Microchip implants
- Tattooing
