= Idyllwild Arts Foundation =

Non-profit organization in Idyllwild, California

Coordinates: 33.73498°N 116.74847°W

Idyllwild Arts Foundation encompasses two institutions in Idyllwild, California for training in the arts: Idyllwild Arts Academy (IAA) and the Idyllwild Arts Summer Program. The institution was formerly known as Idyllwild School of Music and the Arts (ISOMATA).

The Idyllwild Arts Foundation is in the San Jacinto Mountains above Palm Springs, California in the San Bernardino National Forest, at an elevation of 5,100 feet (1,600 m), and is a 2-hour drive from Los Angeles, 2 hours from San Diego and 1 hour from Palm Springs.

== History ==
Idyllwild Arts Foundation was founded by Dr. Max Krone and his wife, Beatrice. They established the Idyllwild Arts Foundation in 1946 and purchased land in the San Jacinto Mountains on which to build. In 1950, approximately one hundred adult students began attending summer classes in the arts.

Over the years, summer activities have continued to grow, expanding to include programs for children of all ages, a Family Camp, Metals Week, Native American Arts Festival, and the Chamber Music Festival. Classes in music, dance, theatre, visual arts, film, writing, and Native American arts are offered to students from age 5 to adult. Each year over 1800 adults and children attend Idyllwild Arts Summer Program courses. Norman Corwin, Ansel Adams, Herbert Zipper, Marguerite N. Clapp, Mark Wilke, Bella Lewitzky, Fritz Scholder, Maria Martinez, Lucy Lewis, Pete Seeger, Robert Ortlieb, and Meredith Willson taught courses there in the summer.

In 1964, the school was given to the University of Southern California (USC) under the terms of an agreement with the Idyllwild Arts Foundation. In 1983, the Foundation exercised its option to resume independent management and resumed sole ownership of the school. In 1985, the first independent boarding high school for the arts in the western United States, the Idyllwild Arts Academy, was established.

== Idyllwild Arts Academy ==
Idyllwild Arts Academy, the boarding school, offers a college preparatory program for grades 9–12 and post-graduates, with training in music, theater, dance, visual art, creative writing, film, and interdisciplinary arts. An audition or portfolio is required for admission.

== Idyllwild Arts Summer Program ==
The Idyllwild Arts Summer Program which began in the summer of 1950, includes more than 95 workshops. These are taught by professional artist-teachers, in dance, music, theatre, visual arts, creative writing, poetry, filmmaking, and Native Arts.

The program for young people features a Children's Center whose participants range in age from 5 to 12 and who select classes and workshops in a variety of arts including multi-arts, dance, piano, theatre, visual arts, poetry, and journal writing.

Junior Artist's Center (ages 11–13) and Youth Arts Center (ages 13–18) offer courses to accommodate a broad range of skill levels and a wide variety of art experiences. Music opportunities include musical theatre, piano classes, jazz workshops, two bands, two orchestras, and chamber music. Visual artists can select courses from introductory art exploration to ceramics, advanced painting and drawing, jewelry, photography, computer animation, mixed media, and video production. Writers can take poetry, fiction, and playwriting workshops. Dancers participate in ballet, jazz, and modern. Actors may take up to six weeks of Theatre Festival workshops, each of which includes a major performance.

Each year, Idyllwild Arts provides financial aid for young people with limited financial resources: twenty-five percent of young people who participate in an arts workshop are awarded financial aid totaling approximately $500,000.

Part of the program involves theme-related workshops, seminars, and performances featuring artists, poets, and musicians. Programs include: Native American Arts, Metals Week & the Chamber Music Festival.

The culmination of the Summer Program is celebrated with a concert by the Festival Choir, Festival Wind Ensemble, and the Festival Orchestra. In previous years this concert ended with a performance of Meredith Willson's "In Idyllwild" by the combined ensembles.
