= Bum (dog) =

Free-ranging dog (1886–1898)

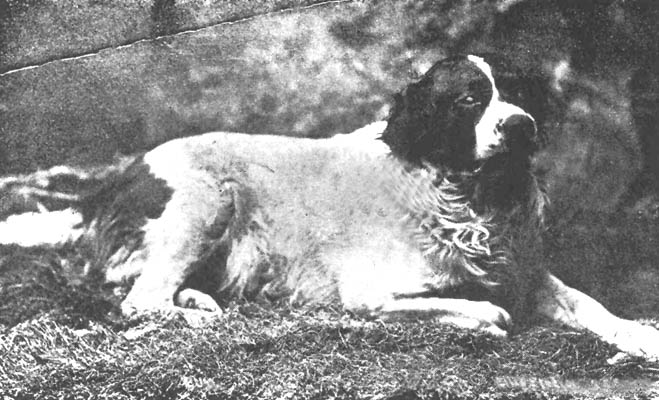
- Bum, possibly in 1895
- Species: Dog (Canis familiaris)
- Breed: St. Bernard and Spaniel mix
- Sex: Male
- Born: July 3, 1886; San Francisco, California, US
- Died: November 10, 1898 (aged 12)
- Known for: Popularity and official recognition from the city
- Residence: San Diego, California, US
- Named after: Slang for a street drunk

Bum (July 3, 1886 – November 10, 1898) was a free-ranging dog who lived on the streets of San Diego, California. His friendly reputation gained him significant local popularity. In 1891, the city used his image on its dog licenses, although he was personally exempted from needing one. He became a popular symbol of the city, where a statue of him stands in the Gaslamp Quarter.

Supposedly born in San Francisco on July 3, 1886, Bum stowed away on a ship to reach San Diego in December. While regularly taken in by a man named Ah Wo Sue, he lived much of his life on the streets, leading to his name. A local journalist, James Edward Friend, wrote about Bum, helping build his public popularity.

Within San Diego, Bum was known to travel by streetcar, join parades, give children rides, and sit with a judge in a courthouse. He was able to catch trains and ferries to other locations, although he always returned to San Diego. At one point he began drinking alcohol, although intervention by Ah Wo Sue ended the habit.

Bum has retained popularity in San Diego, being mentioned by Dr. Seuss on what would have been Bum's 100th birthday, and remaining a mascot of the San Diego History Center's kids program. A statue of Bum has also been erected in Edinburgh, San Diego's twin city.

== Biography ==
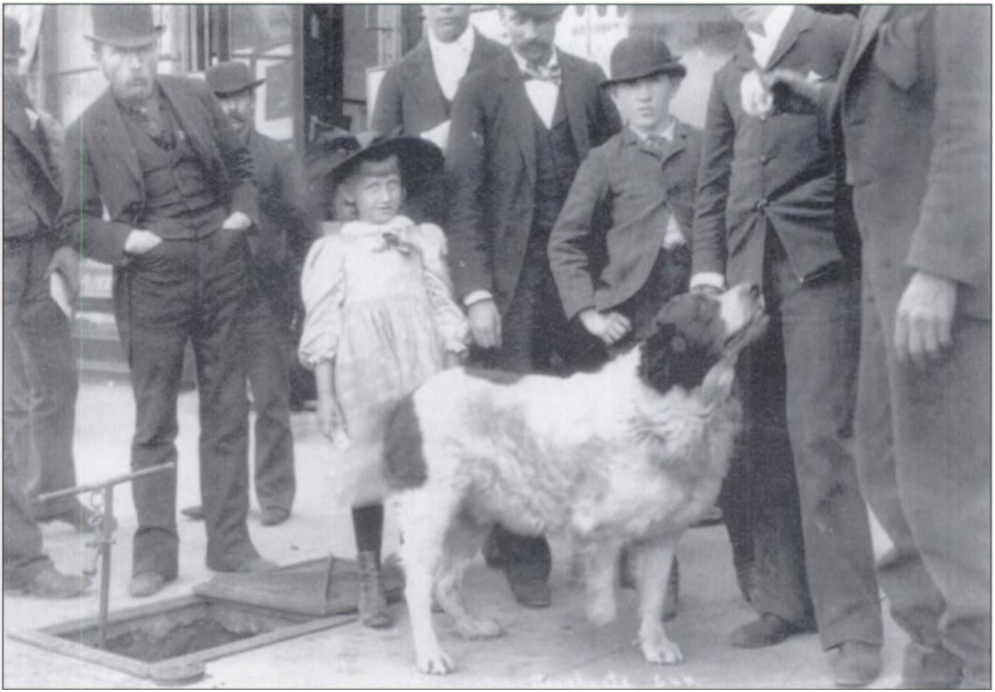
Bum lost part of his front right leg, reportedly due to being hit by a train

Bum was possibly a St. Bernard and Spaniel mix. He was supposedly born in San Francisco on July 3, 1886. He stowed away on the Pacific Coast Steamship Company's Santa Rosa on a trip to San Diego in December. One stated date of arrival was Christmas, leading him later to be mentioned as a Christmas gift to San Diego.

In San Diego, Bum was cared for by a Chinese man named Ah Wo Sue, although he remained a stray. On August 3, 1887, he reportedly lost part of his front right foot and some of his tail to a train accident while fighting a bulldog, leaving him with three working legs. He stayed with Ah Wo Sue to recover, but later left to again live on the streets.

As a stray, Bum came to the attention of a journalist named James Edward Friend, who used Bum's life as a literary device in his writing. Friend may have mixed fact with fantasy in some of his reporting. With a growing public profile, Bum became popular in the city. He became associated with a "romantic vagabond" image, thought to live a friendly and carefree life. He tended to sleep in the middle of busy sidewalks. Anecdotes of his public popularity include a police officer telling off a shopkeeper for hitting Bum, and a crowd accosting an official trying to take Bum to an animal shelter.

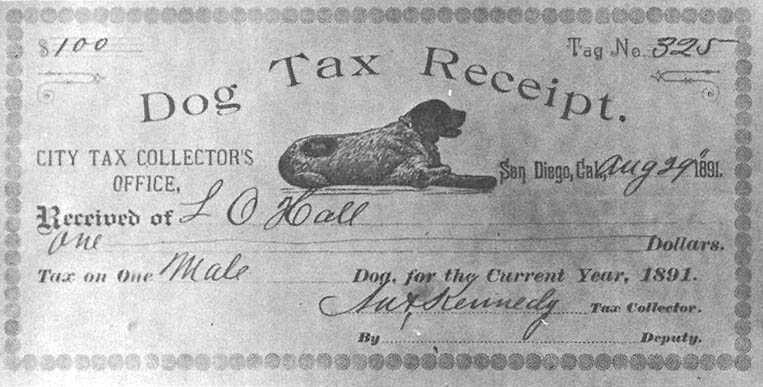
Bum was used to illustrate San Diego's dog licenses.

Bum was known for giving rides to children, riding streetcars, running with fire trucks, joining parades, and sitting in the judge's chair at a courthouse. He was often given food from restaurants, and at least one advertised this fact. Despite great friendliness with humans, he did not get on with other dogs, and when fighting would club them with his leg stump. Some exceptions included a dog named "Toodles", whose death caused Bum to mope, and a puppy Bum rescued from a streetcar rail. Bum was able to take the train to nearby towns and cities, as far as Los Angeles, before returning. He also sometimes traveled by ferry to the construction site of the Hotel del Coronado.

The name "Bum" comes from slang for a street drunk. Bum often hung around bars, and was reportedly at four years old given alcohol and began to drink regularly. During this period he gained a dishevelled appearance. He was again taken in by Ah Wo Sue, who nursed him back to health. He remained sober after this, resuming a "Bohemian" life.

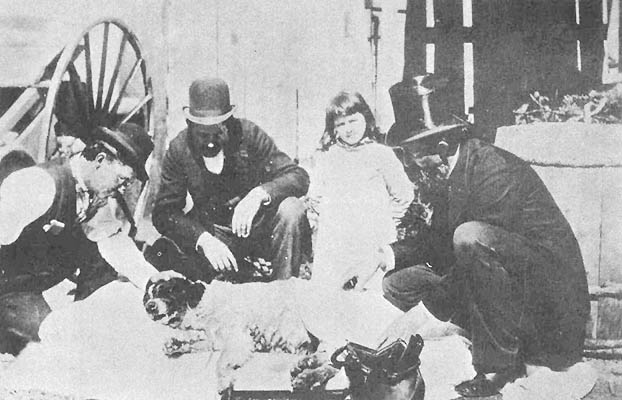
Bum after his leg was broken by a horse

In 1891, Friend applied to the San Diego City Council for a lifetime dog tag in recognition of Bum's service in advertising the city. In addition to granting this, the Council began to use an image of Bum on its dog licenses. These were the first dog licenses issued by the city. Bum received a personal exemption from this licensing, and was by Mayoral Ordinance protected from being taken to an animal shelter.

On May 22, 1894, Bum's left hind leg was broken by a horse, who either kicked him or stepped on him. His recovery was documented in local papers. Bum eventually developed rheumatism, and began to live in a county hospital. Friend died in March 1898, and Bum died on November 10 that same year. While local children raised money for his burial, the burial location is unknown. There are two possible pet cemeteries, and there are rumors he was buried at Balboa Park.

== Legacy ==
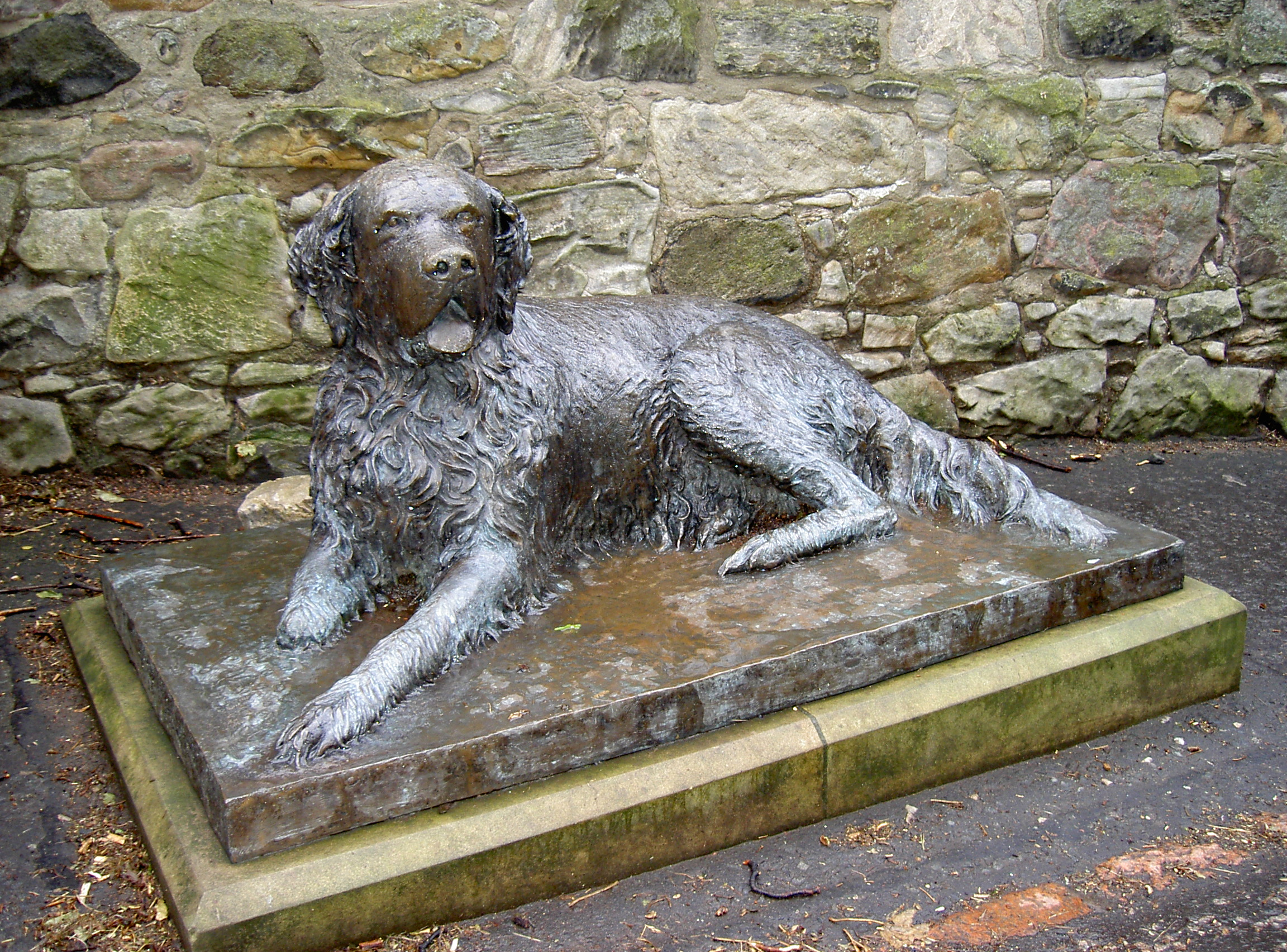
A statue of Bum has been erected in Edinburgh, San Diego's twin city.

A statue of Bum stands in a pocket park outside a museum in the Gaslamp Quarter of San Diego. In 1986, San Diego resident Dr. Seuss drew a card to commemorate Bum's 100th birthday, featuring The Cat in the Hat. The San Diego History Center uses Bum as the mascot of its kids club.

San Diego became a twin city of Edinburgh, Scotland, in 1978. Edinburgh has its own famous dog, Greyfriars Bobby. In 2007, a statue of Greyfriars Bobby was placed in San Diego's Gaslamp Quarter. On July 19, 2008, a statue of Bum was installed in Edinburgh's Princes Street Gardens, on the edge of what was once Greyfriars Bobby's territory.

== See also ==
- List of individual dogs
