= Minton Cronkhite =

Minton Cronkhite (1891-December 11, 1971) was an early manufacturer of radio equipment and a pioneer of shortwave radio and of model railroading.

Born in 1891, Cronkhite became owner of Liberty Electric Company, a manufacturer and dealer of radio equipment in Stamford, Connecticut. He also operated an amateur radio station, call letters ICBG, from a small building on the corner of Clapboard Ridge Road and North Street in Greenwich, Connecticut. In 1921, he worked with members of the Radio Club of America to send the first transatlantic message by shortwave radio, which was received in Ardrossan, Scotland. "Before the test, transoceanic broadcasting had only been by longwave broadcasting stations, which needed huge amount of power in towers, hundreds of feet high," the New York Times wrote in his obituary.

Prominent in society, he was listed in the 1920 edition of the New York Social Register.

Cronkhite was a pioneer in the hobby of model railroading, noted for developing early models that moved under their own power, helping to develop O scale, and making several large layouts displayed for decades in prominent museums. He was a member of the New York Society of Model Engineers, the country's oldest model railroad club, and of The Railway & Locomotive Historical Society. He made several models for the 1939 World's Fair in New York City. "The finest model systems in the U.S. are credited to Minton Cronkhite of San Marino, Calif., who rides in the cabs of real locomotives whenever he can. The Atchison, Topeka and Santa Fe R.R. frequently borrows Mr. Cronkhite's equipment for its displays at fairs," Time magazine wrote in 1937, on the occasion of the third annual meeting of the National Model Railroad Association.

In 1939, Cronkhite built a 50-by-60-foot O scale model railroad for the Museum of Science and Industry in Chicago, Illinois. Millions of people saw it before it was replaced in 2002. It "was one of the first model railroad layouts built on a grand scale" and "a favorite of museum visitors", the Chicago Tribune wrote.

"The old Cronkhite layout at the museum is an icon in the history of model railroads," said Terry Thompson, editor of Model Railroader magazine. "It was almost unbelievably big and realistic for its time, an inspiration for countless thousands of basement layouts."

One of his models is held by the Smithsonian Institution. Commissioned by Baldwin Locomotive Works for donation to the Smithsonian's U.S. National Museum, the nonoperable model of Pennsylvania Railroad class S2 No. 6200 includes the locomotive and tender built to a scale of ¼ inch to the foot.

Cronkhite died on December 11, 1971, in La Jolla, California.
