= Charles Reiffel =

American painter

- Born: 1862; Indianapolis, Indiana, U.S.
- Died: March 14, 1942 (aged 79–80); San Diego, California, U.S.
- Occupations: Lithographer, painter

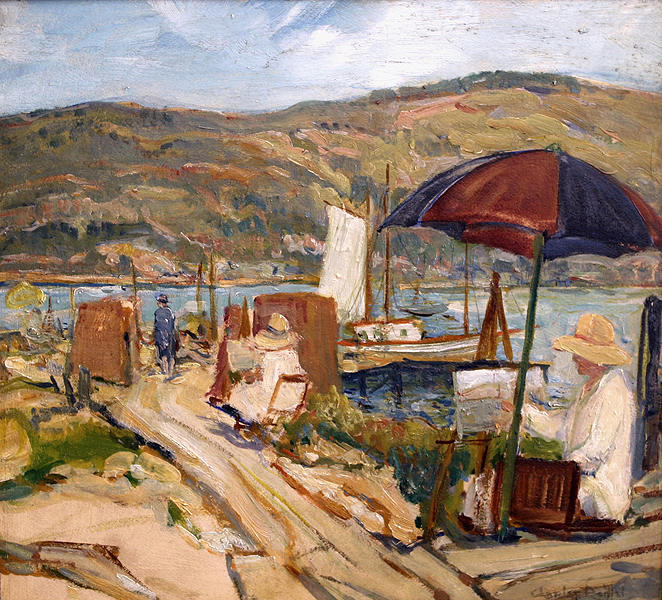
Summer Session at Ballast Point, San Diego. 1930.

Charles Reiffel (1862 - March 14, 1942) was an American lithographer and post-Impressionist painter who became "one of California's best-known painters."

== Life ==
Reiffel was born in 1862 in Indianapolis, Indiana.

Reiffel was initially a lithographer, and he took up painting in 1912. He was self-taught, and he painted en plein air as a post-impressionist. Reiffel first moved to the art colony of Silvermine, Connecticut, where he was the president of the Silvermine Artists' Guild. He later moved to San Diego, where he became "one of California's best-known painters." One of his students was Rose Schneider.

Reiffel died on March 14, 1942, in San Diego, at age 79. He was the subject of a retrospective at the San Diego Museum of Art and the San Diego History Center in 2013.
