= Otto Schneider (artist) =

American painter

Otto Henry Schneider
- Born: 8 August 1865; Muscatine, Iowa, United States
- Died: 23 January 1950 (aged 84); San Diego, United States
- Education: School of the Art Institute of Chicago, Art Students League of Buffalo, Académie Julian
- Occupation: Artist
- Movement: Impressionism

Otto Henry Schneider (8 August 1865 – 23 January 1950) was an American artist, known for his landscape and figure paintings. From 1923 until his death in 1950, he taught at the San Diego Academy of Fine Arts in Balboa Park.

== Biography ==
Otto Henry Schneider was born on August 8, 1865, in Muscatine, Iowa. He studied at the School of the Art Institute of Chicago, under artists John Vanderpoel and Oliver Dennett Grover. And continued his studies at the Art Students League of Buffalo, under artists Lucius Wolcott Hitchcock, John H. Twatchman, George de Forest Brush, and Harry Siddons Mowbray. Followed by study in Paris, France at the Académie Julian, under artists Marcel Baschet, François Schommer, Paul Gervais, and Henri Royer.

From 1921 to 1923, he taught at the Buffalo Academy of Fine Arts, the precursor art school to the Albright Art School (now known as the Albright–Knox Art Gallery) in Buffalo, New York.

Subsequently, he moved to San Diego, where he became an instructor at the San Diego Academy of Fine Arts, and helped establish Contemporary Artists of San Diego, the area's first professional artists' organization.
