= Everett Gee Jackson =

American painter and professor

- Born: 8 October 1900; Mexia, Texas
- Died: 4 March 1995 (aged 94); San Diego, California
- Occupation: Professor

Academic background
- Education: School of the Art Institute of Chicago, University of Southern California

Academic work
- Discipline: Visual art
- Sub-discipline: Impressionism
- Institutions: San Diego State University

Everett Gee Jackson (8 October 1900 – 4 March 1995) was an American impressionist painter and professor. He rose to prominence for his landscapes and portraits in 20th century Mexico City and Southern California.

== Early life ==
Jackson was born in Mexia, Texas in 1900. He studied at Texas A&M University before deciding to embark on an art career. He continued his studies at the Art Institute of Chicago and in 1923 traveled to Mexico with his friend and fellow artist, Lowell Houser. They spent time in Guadalajara, Guanajuato, and Oaxaca, until Jackson moved to Mexico City with his wife. He remained there for several years before moving to San Diego.

== Career ==
While in Mexico, Jackson established studios in Oaxaca and Mexico City. He was greatly influenced by Diego Rivera, José Clemente Orozco, and David Siqueiros. After moving back to San Diego, Jackson received his M.A. from the University of Southern California and began teaching Pre-Columbian Art History at San Diego State University, where he remained from 1930 to 1963. He was active in the local art scene and was the founder of the Latin American Arts Committee of the San Diego Museum of Art. During his lengthy career, he illustrated many books about Latin American History. The campus graduate student art gallery at San Diego State University is named after him.

== Notable works ==
United States President Ronald Reagan presented one of Jackson's pieces, The Hikuli Seekers, as a gift to President José López Portillo of Mexico in 1981. Additionally, Jackson's painting, Serra Museum Tower, San Diego, hangs in the Smithsonian American Art Museum.
