= Maurice Braun =

Hungarian-born American painter (1877–1941)

- Born: October 1, 1877; Nagy-Bittse, Arch-Kingdom of Hungary (now Slovakia)
- Died: November 7, 1941 (aged 64); San Diego, California
- Known for: Painting

Maurice Braun (1877–1941) was a Kingdom of Hungary-born American painter, who became known for his Impressionist landscapes of Southern California.

== Biography ==
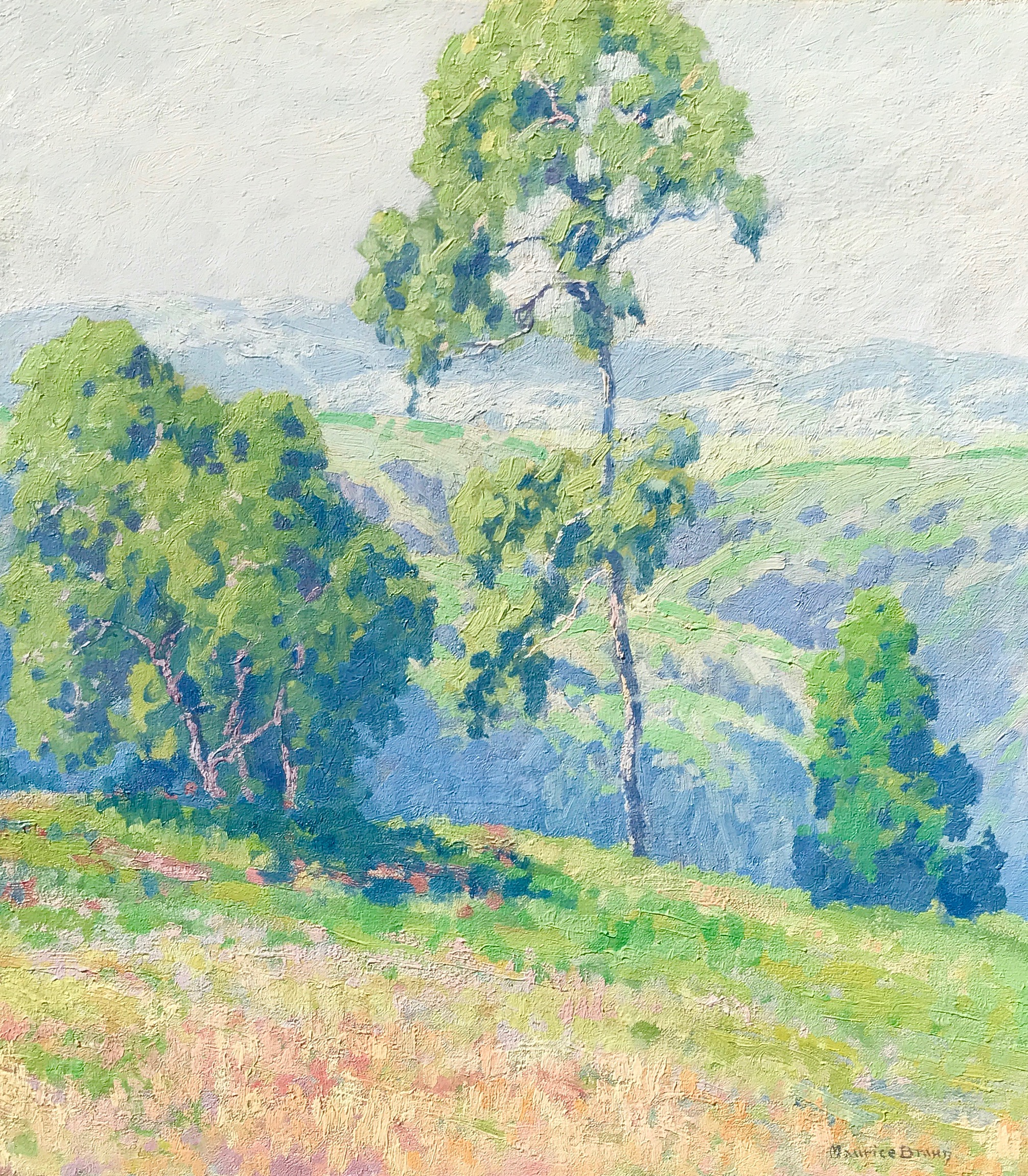
Maurice Braun, Mission Valley, 1919 (coll. Steven Stern)

Maurice Braun was born on October 1, 1877, in Nagy-Bittse, Trencsén, Arch-Kingdom of Hungary (now Slovakia); however, by the age of four, young Maurice and the Braun family had migrated to United States, and settled in New York City.

His professional studies took him to the National Academy of Design, where he studied the French tradition under Francis C. Jones, George W. Maynard and Edgar M. Ward. In 1901 Braun trained under the American painter William Merritt Chase.

He established himself as a figure and portrait painter in New York City, but in 1909 he left for California. One of his students was Rose Schneider.

Braun died in San Diego, California, on November 7, 1941.

== Awards ==
- Hallgarten Prize, National Academy of Design, 1900
- Gold Medal, Panama–California Exposition, San Diego, 1915–16

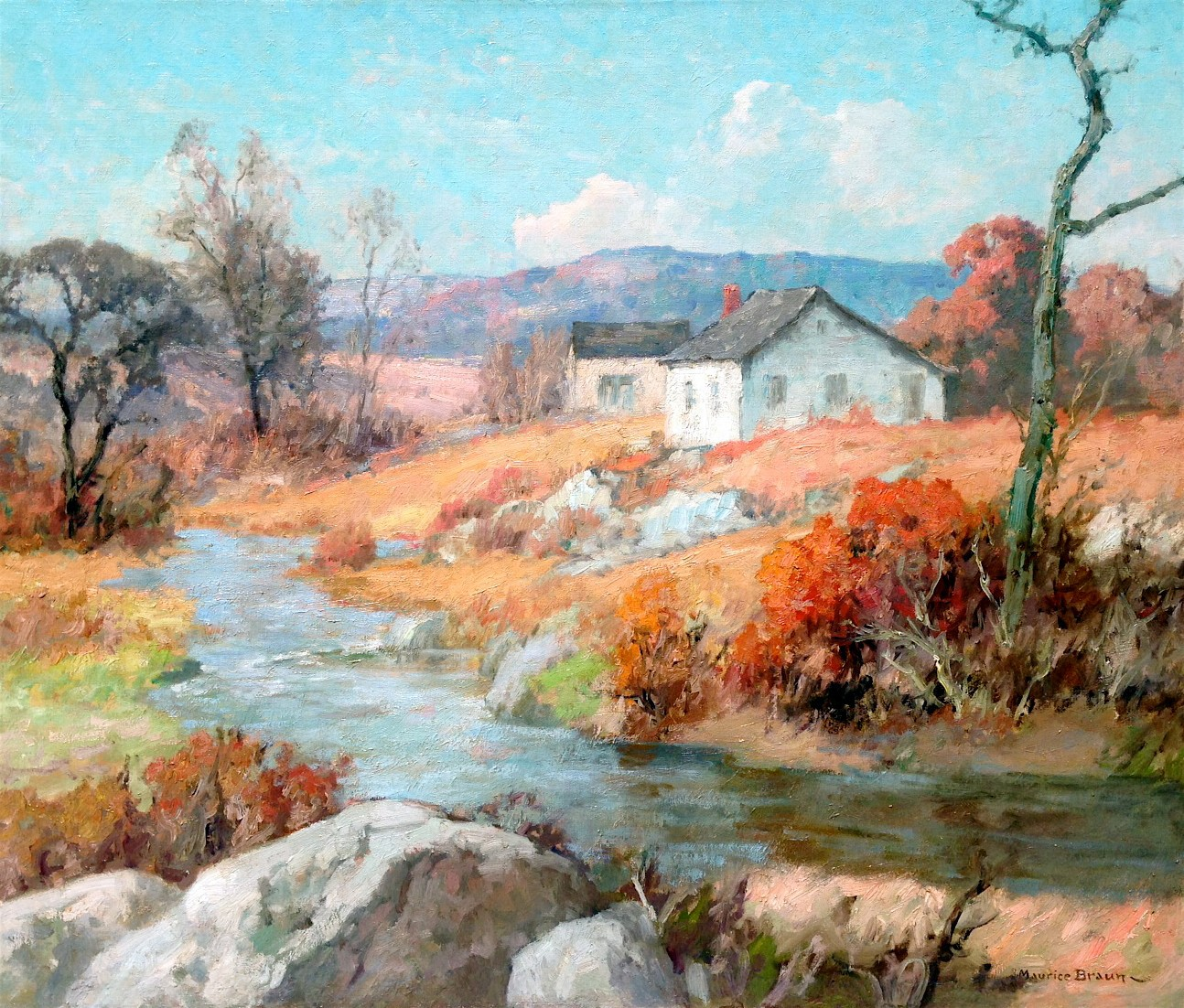
Maurice Braun (November)

== Memberships ==
- Salmagundi Club, Manhattan, New York
- Laguna Beach Art Association
- San Diego Fine Arts Association

== Public collections ==
- Houston Museum, Houston, Texas
- Laguna Art Museum, Laguna, California
- Irvine Museum, Irvine, California
- Los Angeles County Museum of Art, Los Angeles, California
- San Diego History Center, San Diego, California
- San Diego Museum of Art, San Diego, California
- Art Museum of Greater Lafayette
- Long Beach Museum of Art, Long Beach, California
