= List of botanical gardens and arboretums in California =

This list of botanical gardens and arboretums in California is intended to include all significant botanical gardens and arboretums in the U.S. state of California.

Name	Image	Affiliation	City	Coordinates
Alta Vista Botanical Gardens			Vista	
Arlington Garden			Pasadena	
Balboa Park Gardens			San Diego	
Ruth Bancroft Garden			Walnut Creek	
Blake Garden		University of California, Berkeley	Kensington	
Luther Burbank Home and Gardens			Santa Rosa	
California Botanic Garden			Claremont	
California State University Northridge Botanic Garden		California State University	Northridge	
Clovis Botanical Garden		Clovis Botanical Garden	Clovis	
Chavez Ravine Arboretum			Los Angeles	
Chico University Arboretum		California State University	Chico	
Conejo Valley Botanic Garden			Thousand Oaks	
Conservatory of Flowers			San Francisco	
Descanso Gardens			La Cañada Flintridge	
Dunsmuir Botanical Gardens			Dunsmuir	
Eddy Arboretum		United States Forest Service	Placerville	
Edgewood Botanic Garden			Mill Valley	
Filoli		National Trust for Historic Preservation	Woodside	
The Arboretum at Fresno State		California State University	Fresno	
Fullerton Arboretum		California State University	Fullerton	
Gardens at Heather Farm			Walnut Creek	
Hakone Gardens			Saratoga	
Harland Hand Memorial Garden			El Cerrito	
Humboldt Botanical Gardens			Eureka	
Huntington Botanical Gardens			San Marino	
Japanese Friendship Garden			San Jose	
The Japanese Garden			Van Nuys	
Jensen Botanical Gardens			Carmichael	
Labadie Arboretum		Merritt College	Oakland	
Leaning Pine Arboretum		California Polytechnic State University	San Luis Obispo	
Living Desert Zoo and Gardens			Palm Desert	
Los Angeles County Arboretum and Botanic Garden		Los Angeles Arboretum Foundation; County of Los Angeles	Arcadia	
Lotusland			Montecito	
Manhattan Beach Botanical Garden			Manhattan Beach	
Marin-Bolinas Botanical Gardens			Bolinas	
Markham Regional Arboretum			Concord	
Mildred E. Mathias Botanical Garden		University of California	Los Angeles	
McConnell Arboretum and Gardens		Turtle Bay Exploration Park	Redding	
William Joseph McInnes Botanic Garden and Campus Arboretum		Mills College	Oakland	
Mendocino Coast Botanical Gardens			Fort Bragg	
Earl Burns Miller Japanese Garden		California State University	Long Beach	
Montalvo Arts Center			Saratoga	
Moorten Botanical Garden and Cactarium			Palm Springs	
Palomar College Arboretum		Palomar College	San Marcos	
Pikake Botanical Gardens			Valley Center	
Ramirez Canyon Park			Malibu	
Regional Parks Botanic Garden	Regional Parks Botanic Garden	Tilden Regional Park	Berkeley	
Virginia Robinson Gardens			Beverly Hills	
John R. Rodman Arboretum and California Botanic Garden		Pitzer College	Claremont	
Rusch Botanical Gardens			Citrus Heights	
San Diego Botanic Garden			Encinitas	
San Francisco Botanical Garden (Strybing Arboretum)			San Francisco	
San Jose Municipal Rose Garden			San Jose	
San Luis Obispo Botanical Garden			San Luis Obispo	
San Mateo Arboretum			San Mateo	
Santa Barbara Botanic Garden			Santa Barbara	
Sherman Library and Gardens			Corona Del Mar	
Sonoma Botanical Garden			Glen Ellen	
South Coast Botanic Garden			Palos Verdes	
Stanford University Arboretum (includes Arizona Cactus Garden)		Stanford University	Palo Alto	
Sunnyside Conservatory		City of San Francisco	San Francisco	
University Arboretum		California State University	Sacramento	
University of California Botanical Garden		University of California, Berkeley	Berkeley	
University of California, Davis Arboretum		University of California	Davis	
UC Irvine Arboretum		University of California	Irvine	
University of California, Riverside Botanic Gardens		University of California	Riverside	
Arboretum at the University of California, Santa Cruz		University of California	Santa Cruz	
Ventura Botanical Gardens	View of Downtown Ventura from the Ventura Botanical Gardens		Ventura	
Wrigley Botanical Gardens			Santa Catalina Island	
M. Young Botanic Garden			Kerman	

== See also ==
- List of botanical gardens and arboretums in the United States
- Gardens in California
