= Labadie =

Labadie or La Badie can refer to:

== People ==
- Bernard Labadie (born 1963), Canadian orchestra conductor
- Florence La Badie (1888–1917), American-Canadian film actress
- Jean de Labadie (1610–1674), French Reformed Pietist
- Jean-Michel Labadie (born 1974), French bassist
- Jo Labadie (1850–1933), American labor organizer, anarchist, social activist, printer, publisher, essayist and poet
- Joss Labadie (born 1990), English footballer
- Laurance Labadie (1898–1975), American anarchist and author, son of Jo Labadie
- Michel Labadie (1932–1990), Canadian ice hockey player

== Places ==
- Labadee (also Labadie), a Haitian port town
- Labadie, Missouri, an American unincorporated community

== See also ==
- Labadie Arboretum, Merritt College, Oakland, California, United States
- Labadi (disambiguation)
