= Charles Jensen =

Charles Jensen may refer to:

- Charles Jensen (gymnast) (1885–1920), Danish gymnast
- Charles Jensen (poet) (born 1977), American poet and editor
- C. W. Jensen, retired police captain and commentator on the television series World's Wildest Police Videos
- Charles C. Jensen, namesake of the Jensen Botanical Gardens
