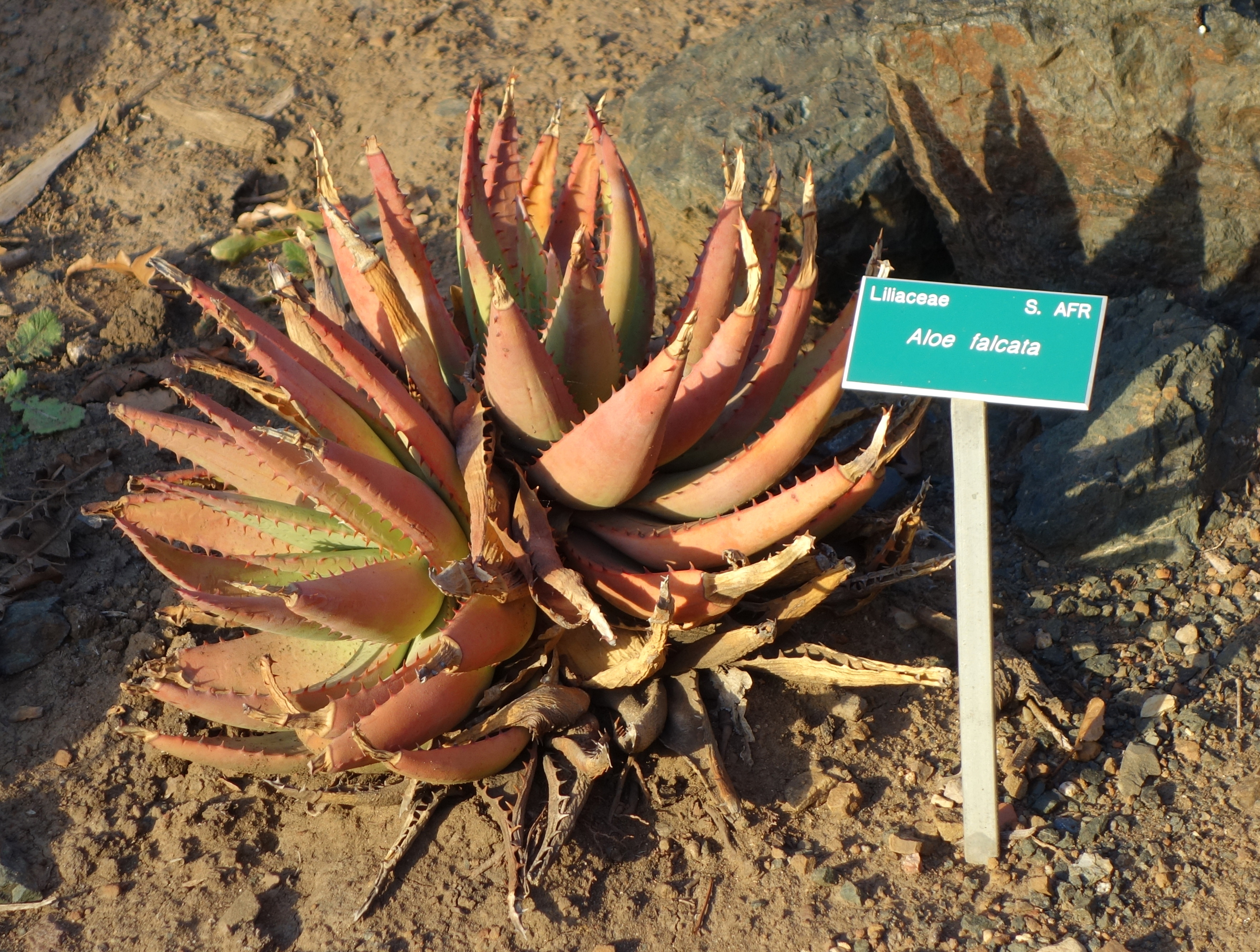
- Aloe falcata photographed at the San Luis Obispo Botanical Garden, United States

Conservation status
- CITES Appendix II (CITES)

Scientific classification
- Kingdom: Plantae
- Clade: Tracheophytes
- Clade: Angiosperms
- Clade: Monocots
- Order: Asparagales
- Family: Asphodelaceae
- Subfamily: Asphodeloideae
- Genus: Aloe
- Species: A. falcata

Binomial name
- Aloe falcata Baker

= Aloe falcata =

Species of succulent

Aloe falcata is a species of succulent plant in the genus Aloe. Described by English botanist John Gilbert Baker in 1880, it is known only from the Northern Cape and north-west Western Cape in South Africa.

== See also ==
- List of Aloe species
