= Storrier-Stearns Japanese Garden =

- U.S. National Register of Historic Places
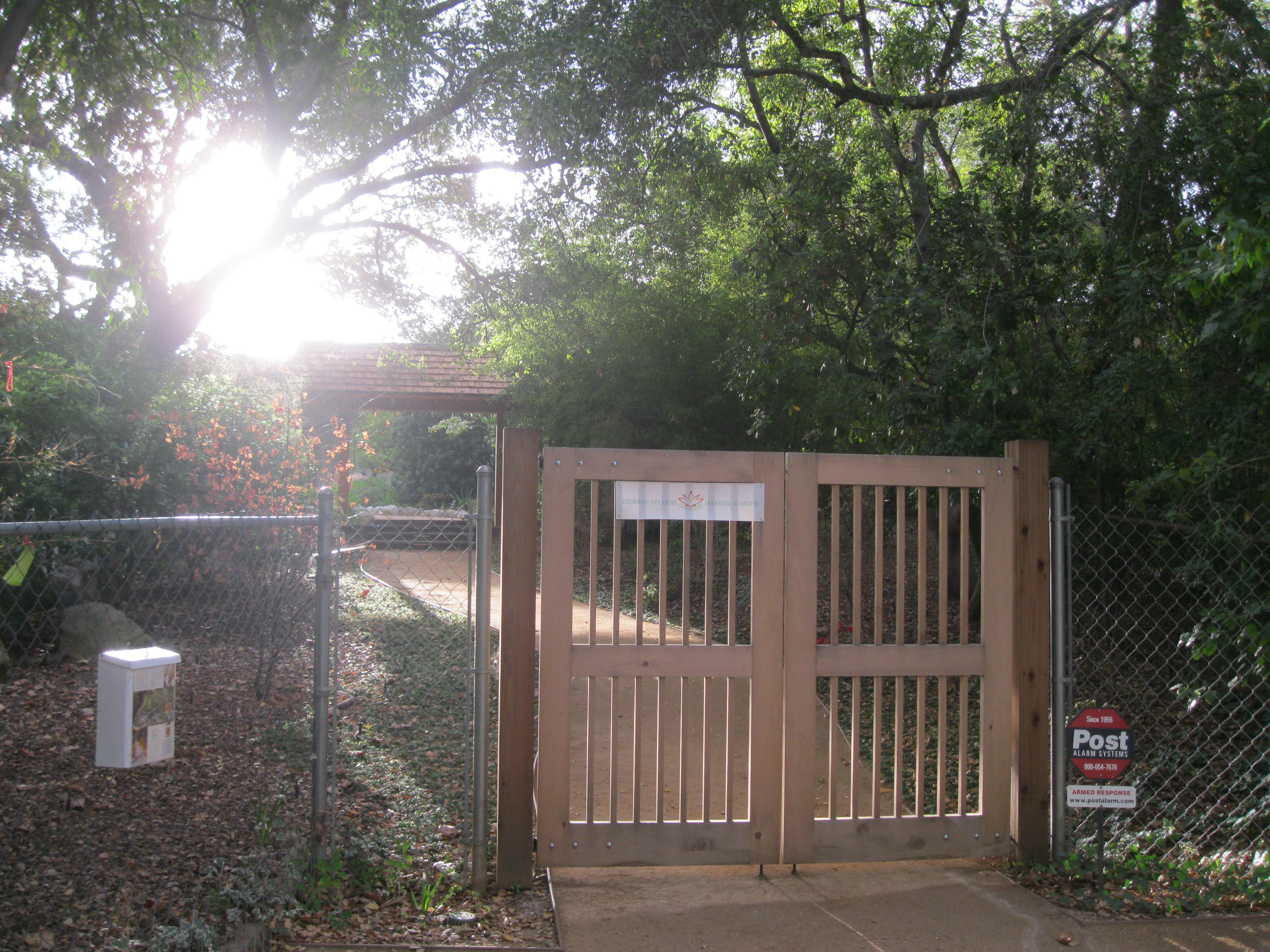
- The entrance to the garden

- Location within the Los Angeles metropolitan area Location within California Location within the United States
- Location: 270 Arlington Dr., Pasadena, California
- Coordinates: 34°7′41″N 118°9′21″W
- Area: 1.5 acres (0.61 ha)
- Built: 1937
- Architect: Kinzuchi Fuji
- Architectural style: Japanese
- NRHP reference No.: 05000050
- Added to NRHP: February 15, 2005

The Storrier-Stearns Japanese Garden is a Japanese garden located at 270 Arlington Drive in Pasadena, California. The garden was designed and built over seven years starting in 1935 when Charles and Ellamae Storrier Stearns hired first generation immigrant, and Japanese landscape designer, Kinzuchi Fujii. The 1.45-acre (0.59 ha) garden took four years to construct once its design was complete and cost $150,000. The garden was designed as a Hill and Pond Strolling Garden, the "chisen kaiyu shiki" form, which traditionally includes water features and walking paths. This garden includes 25-foot (7.6 m) ponds with waterfalls, hills, bridges and paths. The garden's teahouse and many of its granite, bronze, and wood features were imported from Japan. The garden became a landmark for the Japanese community in Pasadena, and its teahouse served as a meeting place for Japanese cultural activities until it burned down in 1981. It was rebuilt to the original plans during the garden's recent restoration by Takeo Uesugi, FASLA.

The garden is open to the public the last Sunday of every month during the pandemic.

The garden was added to the National Register of Historic Places on February 15, 2005.

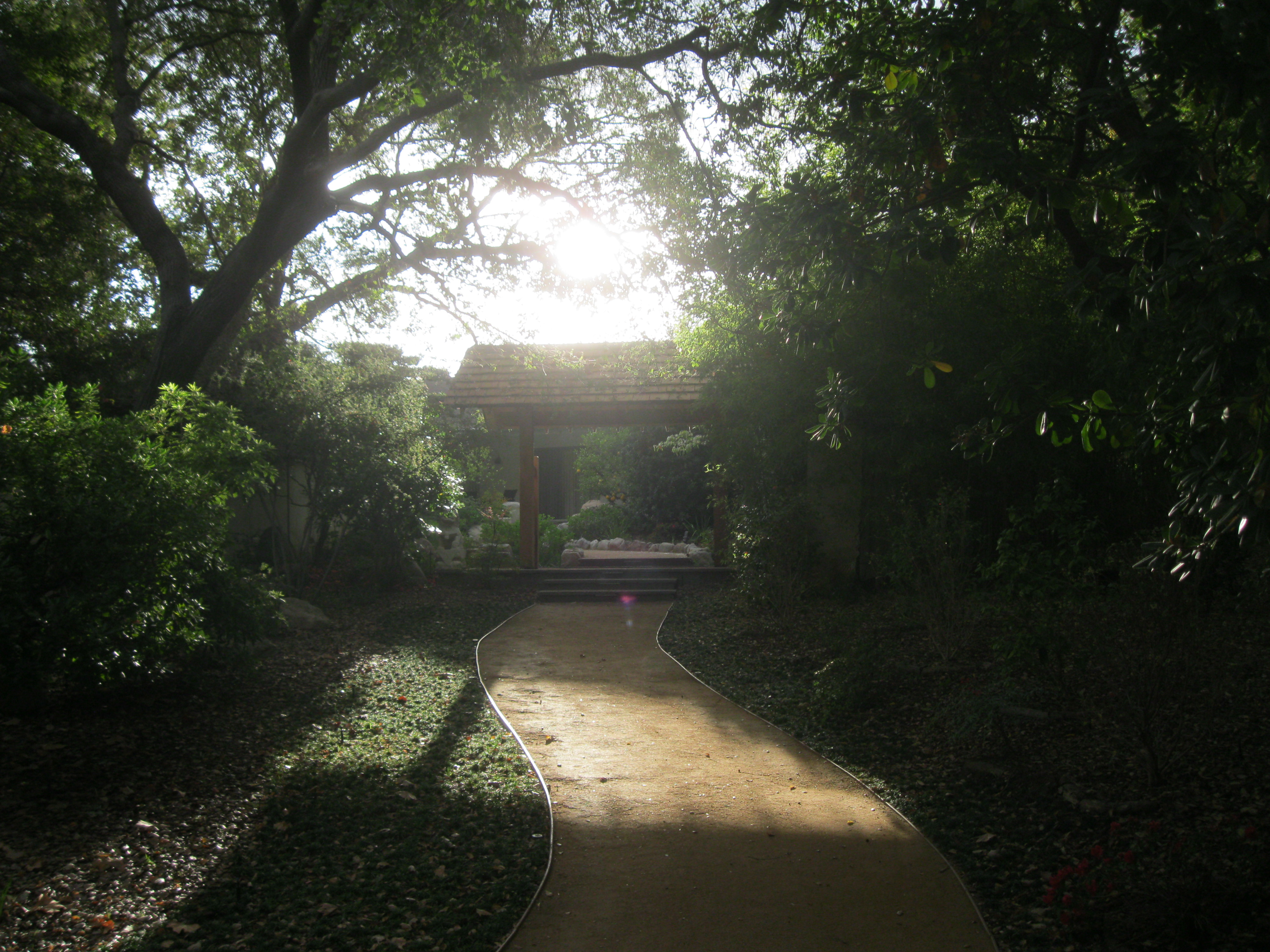
The garden's entrance walkway

== See also ==
- Japanese aesthetics
- Japanese rock garden
- Tea garden
- Arlington Garden is located across the street from the Japanese garden.
- List of botanical gardens and arboretums in California
