= Ventura Botanical Gardens =

Botanical garden in California

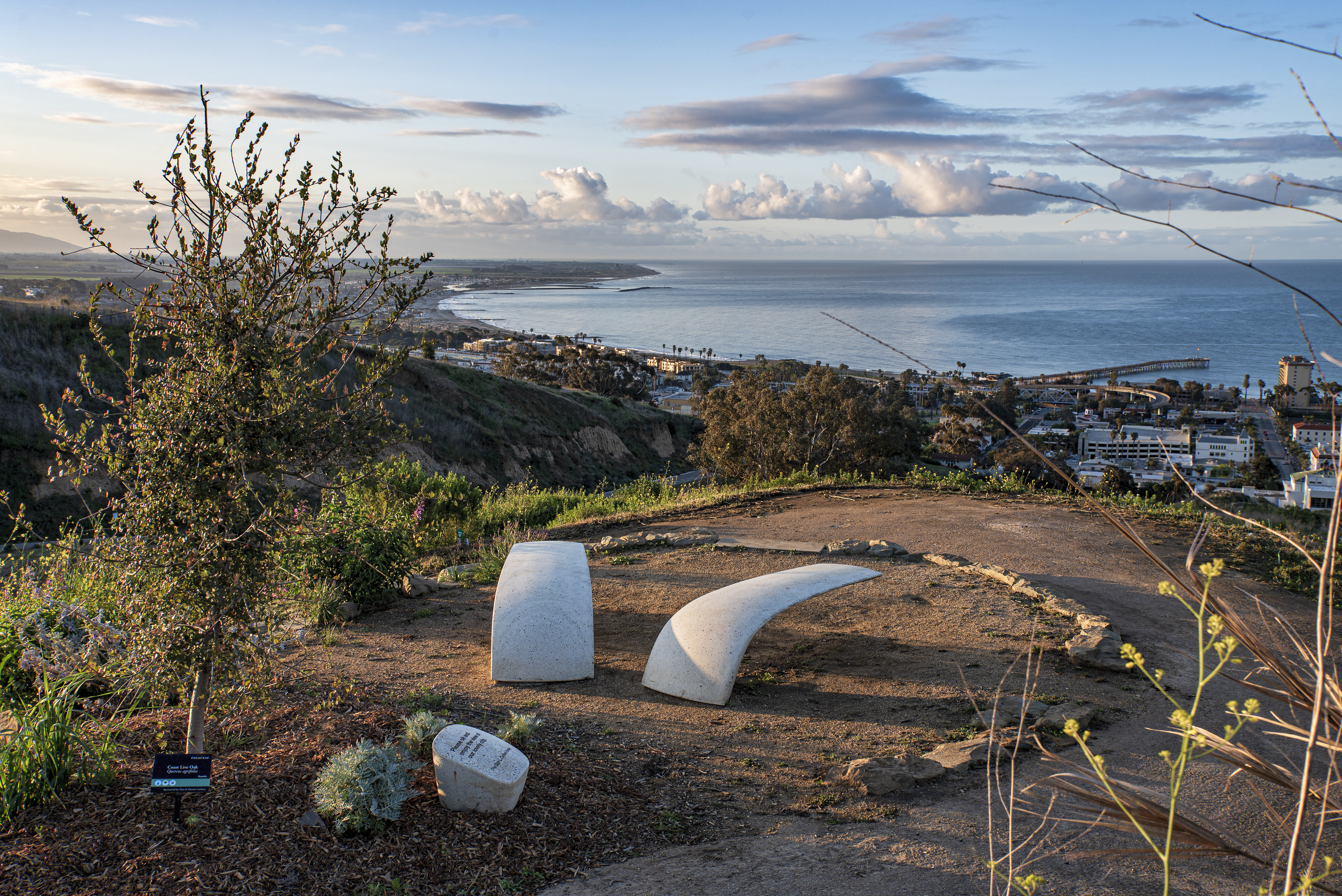
- Ventura Botanical Gardens

- Location within California
- Type: Botanical garden
- Location: 567 S. Poli Street; Ventura, California
- Coordinates: 34°16′55″N 119°17′31″W
- Area: 107 acres (43 ha)
- Open: Tuesday - Sunday, 9am to 5pm
- Status: Open year round
- Website: venturabotanicalgardens.com

The Ventura Botanical Gardens (44 ha / 107 acres) re-opened November 3, 2018 after widespread damage caused by the Thomas Fire, is located at 567 S. Poli Street in Ventura, California, United States.

== Points of interest ==
The Ventura Botanical Gardens collection contains roughly 100,000 plants set on a slope behind City Hall in Ventura. The completion of the entire gardens are planned by the 2040s. The collection strives to replicate plant communities from five different climate zones throughout the world. and associations as they occur in nature. The climate zone gardens include Chile, South Africa, California, the Mediterranean basin, as well plans for an Australian garden coming in the future. The Ramble is the largest garden on the site populated by native plants local to the Southern California climate zone.

=== Chilean Gardens ===
The Chilean gardens was the first garden created in the Ventura Botanical Gardens. Both imported and domestic Chilean plants were introduced with the support of a $15,000 grant by the Stanley Smith Horticultural Trust which was then matched by the Ventura Botanical Gardens.

=== South African Gardens ===
The South African gardens are representative of the fynbos and karoo plant communities. The South African gardens are the most complete garden to date populated by protea, geraniums, ericas, aloe and several South Africa coral tree specimen. The entire site has views of Downtown Ventura, the Channel Islands, and the Santa Monica Mountains.

=== Mediterranean Gardens ===
The plants from the Mediterranean basin included a mature pine forest destroyed in the Thomas Fire. The Mediterranean collection is now being updated with a diverse olive grove of 140 trees and 32 traditional cultivars from near the Mediterranean Sea.

== See also ==
- List of botanical gardens in California
