= Wish Tree (Yoko Ono art series) =

Art installation series by Yoko Ono

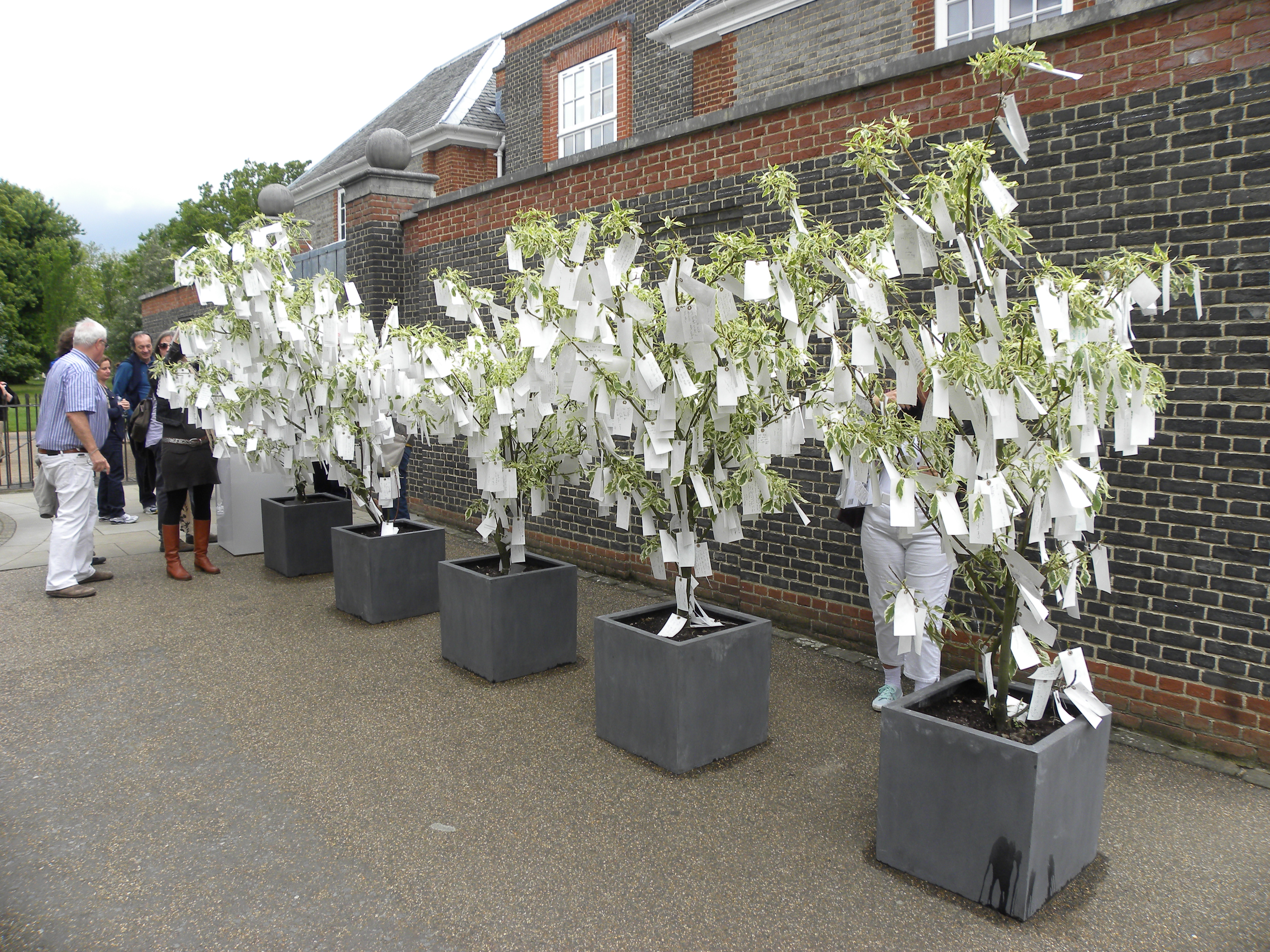
Yoko Ono's Wish Trees for London at the "Yoko Ono To The Light" exhibition at the Serpentine Gallery, London, June 2012

Wish Tree is an ongoing art installation series by Japanese artist Yoko Ono, started in 1996, in which a tree native to a site is planted under her direction. Viewers are usually invited to tie a written wish to the tree except during the winter months when a tree can be more vulnerable. Locations of the piece have included New York City, St. Louis, Detroit, Wish Tree for Washington, DC, San Francisco, Pasadena, and Palo Alto, California, Tokyo, Venice, Paris, Dublin, London, Exeter, England, Finland and Buenos Aires, Argentina, Calgary.

Her 1996 Wish Piece had the following instructions:

Make a wish. Write it down on a piece of paper. Fold it and tie it around a branch of a Wish Tree. Ask your friends to do the same. Keep wishing. Until the branches are covered with wishes.

Installations have involved from one to 21 trees, and varieties include lemon trees, eucalyptus, and crepe myrtles. To honor wish writers' privacy, Ono claims she does not read the wishes, and collects them all to be buried at the base of the Imagine Peace Tower on Viðey Island in Kollafjörður Bay in Iceland. To date over 1 million wishes have been buried beneath the tower.

== History ==
The series developed after an installation of one tree in Finland grew into a mini-forest, and Ono felt a continuing social need. She has also said:

As a child in Japan, I used to go to a temple and write out a wish on a piece of thin paper and tie it around the branch of a tree. Trees in temple courtyards were always filled with people's wish knots, which looked like white flowers blossoming from afar.

In fall 2010, Ono performed Voice Piece for Soprano, near the MoMA rendition of the piece as part of the museum's collections show. Musician Pharrell Williams wrote on one in New York in 2013.

== Locations ==
Year	City or country	Institution or group, if known	Title, if known	Tree type, if known	Other
Before 1996	Finland				
1996	Alicante, Valencia, Spain			pomegranate	
2002	San Francisco	SFMoMA			
2002	Exeter, England				
2003	Venice, Italy	Peggy Guggenheim Collection	Wish Tree Venice 2003. To Peggy with Love x Yoko	olive tree	Permanent installation
2007	Washington, DC	Hirshhorn Museum gardens	Wish Tree for Washington, DC	dogwood	
2007	São Paulo, Brazil	Museum of Contemporary Art, University of São Paulo	Yoko Ono - Uma Retrospectiva	ficus benjamina	10/11/2007 to 03/02/2008
2008	Pasadena, California	One Colorado shopping center	Wish Tree for Pasadena	21 crepe myrtle trees	Permanently installed at Arlington Garden, Pasadena
2009	Palo Alto, California	Stanford University campus		two lemon trees	
2009	Tokyo				
2010	New York City	MoMA			
2010	Oberlin, Ohio	Oberlin College			
2012	New York City	Occupy Wall Street (Zuccotti Park)	Wish Tree for Zuccotti Park		Project altered to distribution of 10,000 postcards after fall 2011 police raid of park
2012	Dublin		Wish Tree for Ireland		
2012	London	Serpentine Galleries	Wish Tree for London		
2012	Stockholm	Moderna Museet	Wish Tree for Stockholm	grapefruit	
2012-13	Brooklyn, New York	Brooklyn Museum			
2013	St. Louis	Saint Louis Art Museum			
2013	Sydney, Australia	Museum of Contemporary Art Sydney	Wish Tree for Sydney	six eucalyptus	
2014	Orlando and Tampa, Florida	Hard Rock Cafe locations			
2016	Manhattan Beach, California	Manhattan Beach Art Center	Wish Tree for Manhattan Beach	unknown	Temporary installation
2016	Buenos Aires, Argentina	MALBA			Part of Yoko Ono retrospective
2018	New York City	Performa 17		unknown	Temporarily installed at festival headquarters
2019	Bad Homburg vor der Höhe	Blickachsen	Wish Trees for Bad Homburg	apple tree	
2019	France	Château la Coste	Wish Trees	8 olive trees	Permanent installation
2022	Liverpool	Yoko Ono Lennon Centre	Wish Trees	olive	Temporary installation
2024	London	Tate Modern	Wish Trees for London	olive	Temporary installation
2024	New York	Park Avenue Armory	Wish Tree		Temporary installation
2024	Berlin	Martin Gropius Bau & Neue National Gallery	Wish Tree for Berlin	olive	Temporary installation
2024	Bochum, Germany	Situation Kunst, Museum unter Tage	Wish Tree		Temporary installation
