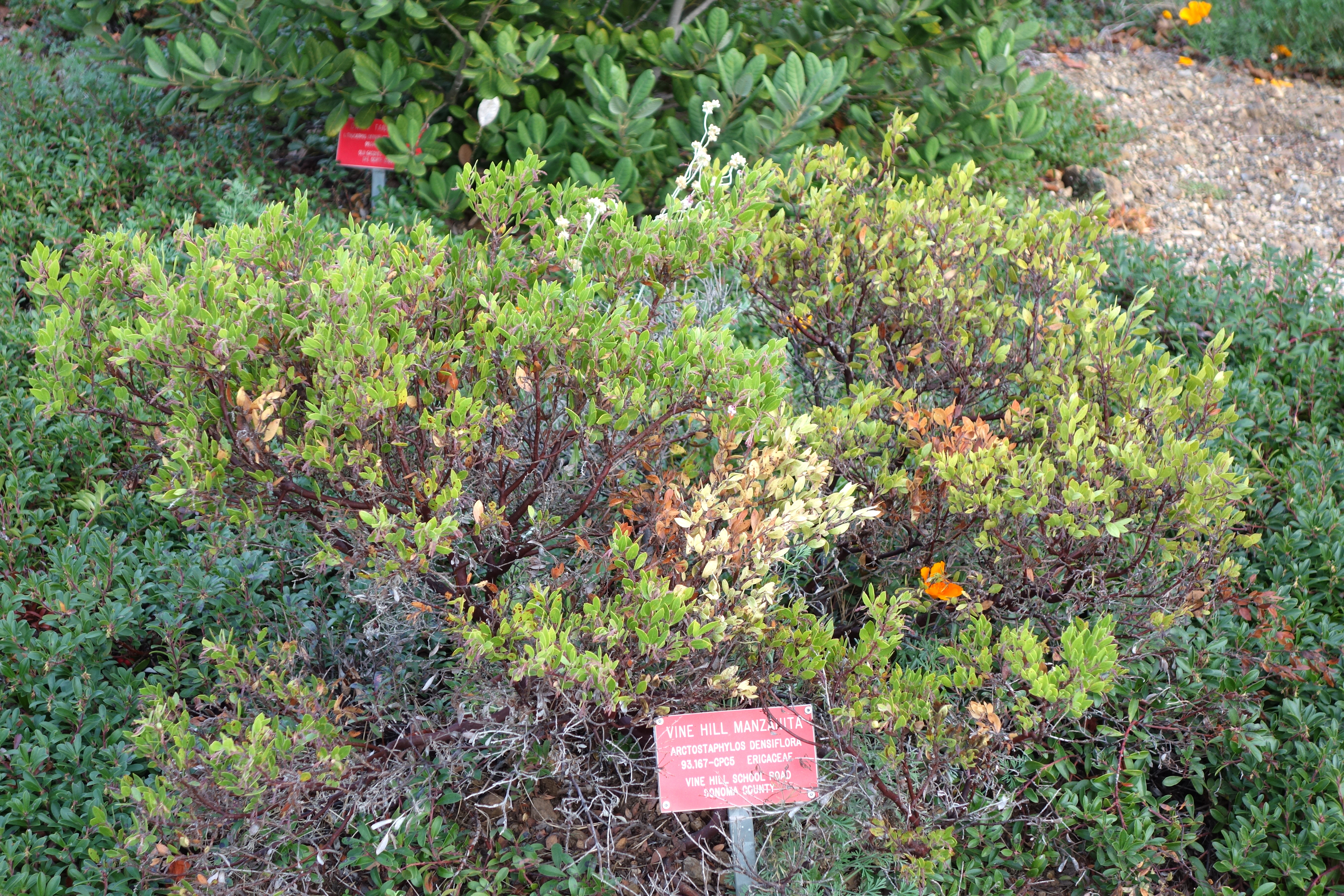

Conservation status
- Critically Imperiled (NatureServe)

Scientific classification
- Kingdom: Plantae
- Clade: Tracheophytes
- Clade: Angiosperms
- Clade: Eudicots
- Clade: Asterids
- Order: Ericales
- Family: Ericaceae
- Genus: Arctostaphylos
- Species: A. densiflora

Binomial name
- Arctostaphylos densiflora M.S.Baker

= Arctostaphylos densiflora =

Species of flowering plant

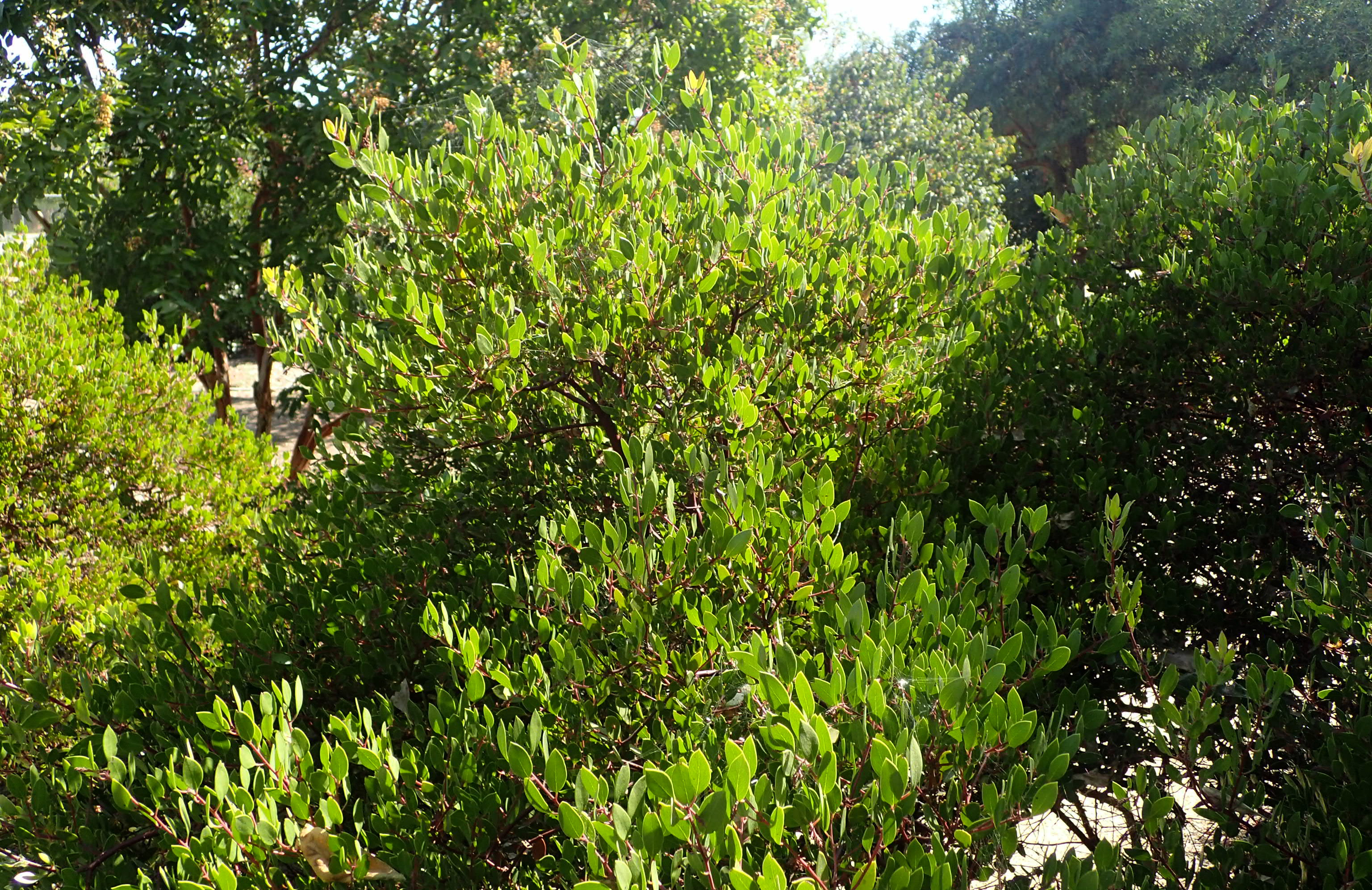
Arctostaphylos densiflora in Clovis Botanical Garden in 2016

Arctostaphylos densiflora, known by the common name Vine Hill manzanita, is a very rare species of manzanita. It is endemic to Sonoma County, California, where it is known from only one extant population of 20 to 30 individual plants. These last wild members of the species are on land near Sebastopol which is owned and protected by the California Native Plant Society. In addition, there are five to ten plants of this manzanita taxon growing on private property about a mile away. The local habitat is mostly chaparral on sandy shale soils.

== Pathogenic Risk ==
The entire wild population is infected with the root pathogen Phytopthera cinnamomi and subject to mortality, which could result in species extinction.

Plants have been propagated through a collaborative effort by California Native Plant Society (CNPS) volunteers at the Vine Hill Preserve and the CNPS Nursery located at the Laguna de Santa Rosa Foundation near Santa Rosa, California. The purpose of the effort is to outplant to establish healthy genetically diverse plants at several locations other than the Vine Hill Preserve.

Locations as of May 2023 with outplanting of disease free manzanitas include the Pitkin Marsh Preserve and Cunningham Marsh Preserve in Sonoma County. Others include Regional Parks Botanical Garden Tilden, the University of California Berkeley Botanical Garden, the San Francisco Botanical Garden, the University of California Santa Cruz Arboretum, San Francisco State University, the Mendocino Coast Botanical Gardens, Clovis Botanical Garden, and the northern most outplanting at the Humboldt Botanical Garden with six of the 20 genetic lineages.

== Description ==
Arctostaphylos densiflora is a small shrub growing in low, spreading clumps under one meter in height. Of the heath family, its shiny green leaves are oval to widely lance-shaped and less than three centimeters long. It bears inflorescences of light to bright pink urn-shaped flowers. The fruit is a drupe about half a centimeter wide.

Ecological Relationships

| The flowers of this species provide nectar for butterflies and native bees in the spring, berries provide food for birds in the late summer, and the low-growing habit of the plant make it a good home for California valley quail and wrentit nests. (Lowe 1999) |

Habitat

| Roadside banks and neighboring areas in chaparral habitat with acid marine sand (York 1987). |

== Species differentiation ==
A. densiflora likely appeared about 1.5 million years ago, although the Arctostaphylos genus itself arose in the Miocene era.

== See also ==
- California chaparral and woodlands
