= Sunnyside Conservatory =

Historic conservatory in San Francisco, California, US

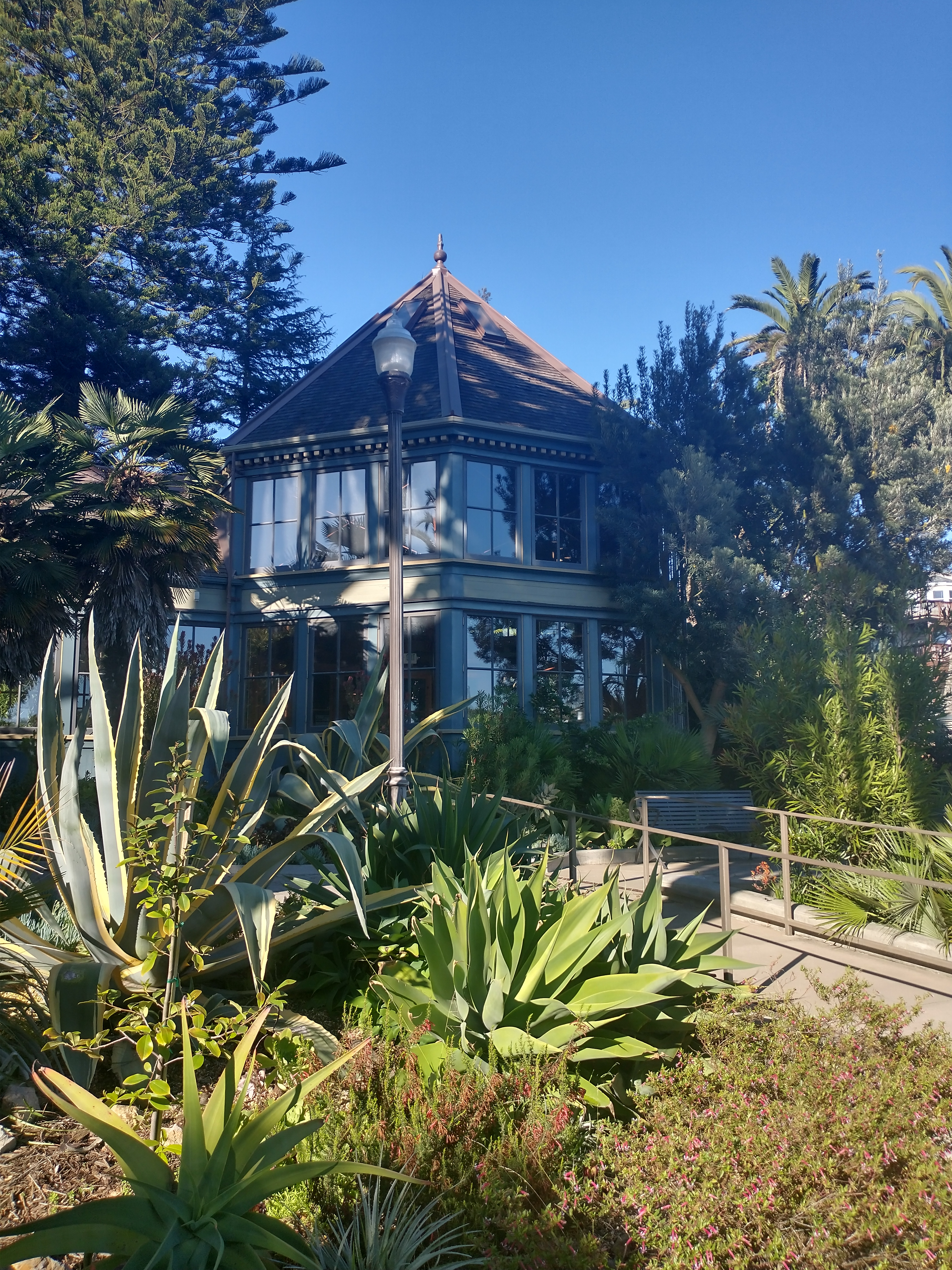
- Interactive map of Sunnyside Conservatory
- Location: 236 Monterey Boulevard, San Francisco, California, U.S.
- Coordinates: 37.731913°N 122.440790°W
- Built: 1902
- Built for: William Augustus Merralls
- Restored: 1999–2006

San Francisco Designated Landmark
- Designated: December 7, 1975
- Reference no.: 78

Sunnyside Conservatory is an event space and former historic 1902 plant conservatory in the Sunnyside neighborhood of San Francisco, California. It is listed as a San Francisco Designated Landmark (No. 78) since December 7, 1975. It is owned by San Francisco Recreation and Parks since 1980. Sunnyside Conservatory has also been known as the Merralls Conservatory, or incorrectly as Merrills Conservatory.

== History ==
It is a Victorian-era two-story octagonal redwood structure used as an exotic plant conservatory, which has been historically associated with the house located at 258 Monterey Boulevard. The conservatory was built by British engineer William Augustus Merralls (1852–1914), who specialized in the engineering and design of mining equipment. In 1897, his first wife Lizzie A. Merralls bought a house at 258 Sunnyside Avenue (later Monterey Blvd). Over the next five years she purchased seven adjacent 25 feet (7.6 m) lots. The Merralls' built the conservatory in 1902.

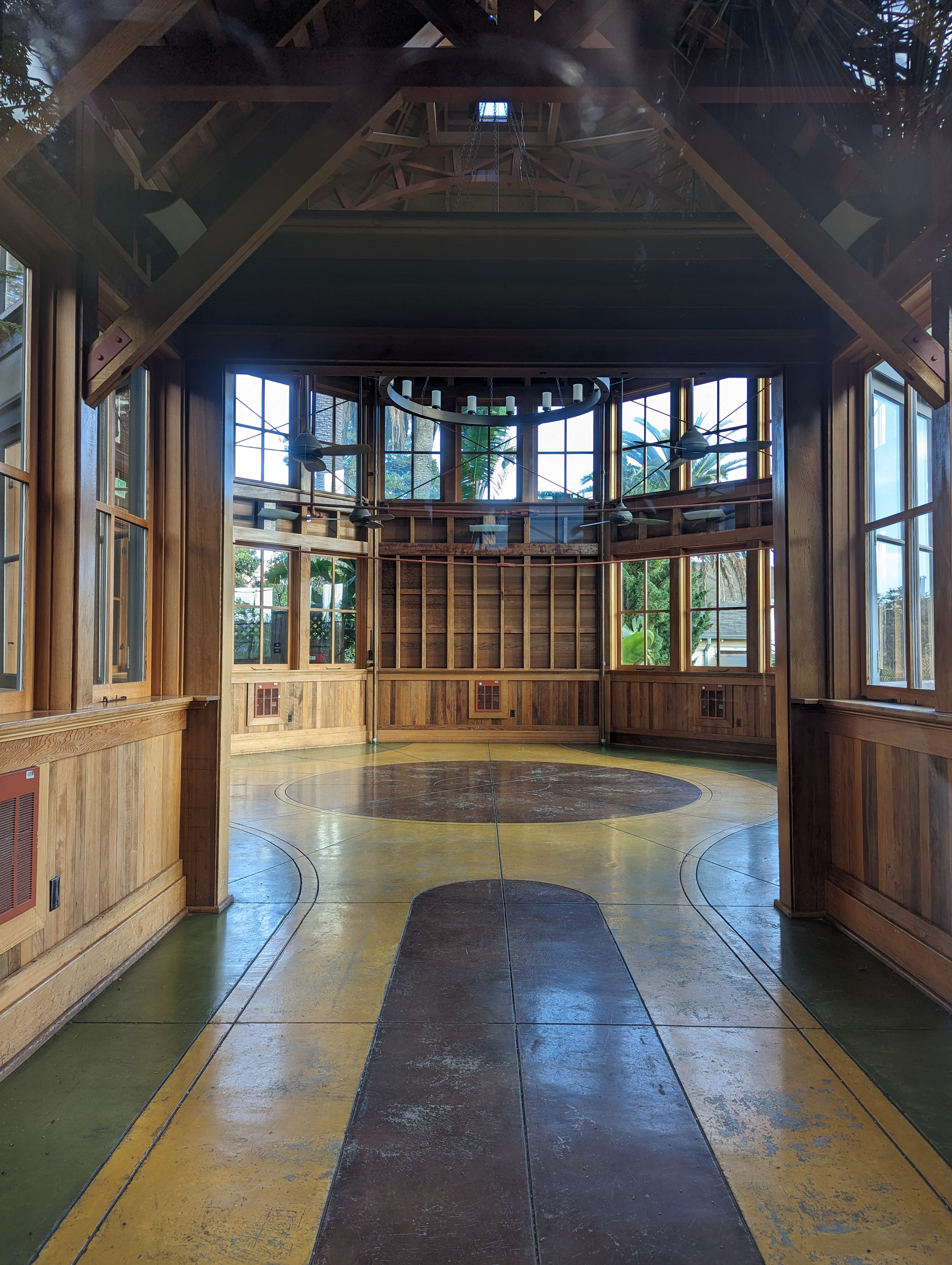
Sunnyside Conservatory (2024) interior

Merralls died in 1914 when he was hit by a Southern Pacific train in Alameda. His second wife and widow, Temperance Laura Merralls, and his son remained in the property until 1916, when the bank repossessed the house. In 1919, the house, land, and conservatory were purchased by Ernest and Angele Van Beckh. He had been a self-proclaimed clairvoyant and con artist who narrowly escaped prosecution a few years before. The Van Beckhs remained in the property until the 1960s. Ernest died in 1951. In 1953, another house was built on the conservatory property at number 234. By 1969, Angele had sold all of the property to Bertha and Walter Anderson.

After Walter Anderson died, Bertha sold the conservatory property in 1974 to Robert Anderson (no relation), who was interested in redeveloping the surrounding lots. Sunnyside Neighborhood Association had just formed and the neighbors were interested in preserving the Sunnyside Conservatory site. At this time Sunnyside Conservatory was sometimes known as the Merralls Conservatory, or incorrectly as Merrills Conservatory. It was designated a San Francisco City Landmark on December 7, 1975. However Robert Anderson still owned the property and proceeded to get a permit to tear down the conservatory structure. The western wing of the structure was demolished before he was stopped. The City of San Francisco used Open Space Fund money to purchase the land and conservatory from Anderson.

=== Renovation ===
Ted Kipping (1945–2019), a neighbor, tended to the exotic trees planted on the lot after the demolition. A new group formed in 1999 called the Friends of Sunnyside Conservatory, and they raised funds and worked with the city to renovate the conservatory structure. One of the neighbors had saved the original redwood finial that sat on the roof, and returned it 30 years later during the renovation to allow construction of a copper-covered replica.

Sunnyside Conservatory now serves as a meeting and events space for community and groups, and is frequently used for weddings.

== See also ==
- List of botanical gardens and arboretums in California
- List of San Francisco Designated Landmarks
- Conservatory of Flowers
