= Humboldt Botanical Gardens =

Gardens near Eureka, California, United States

Humboldt Botanical Garden
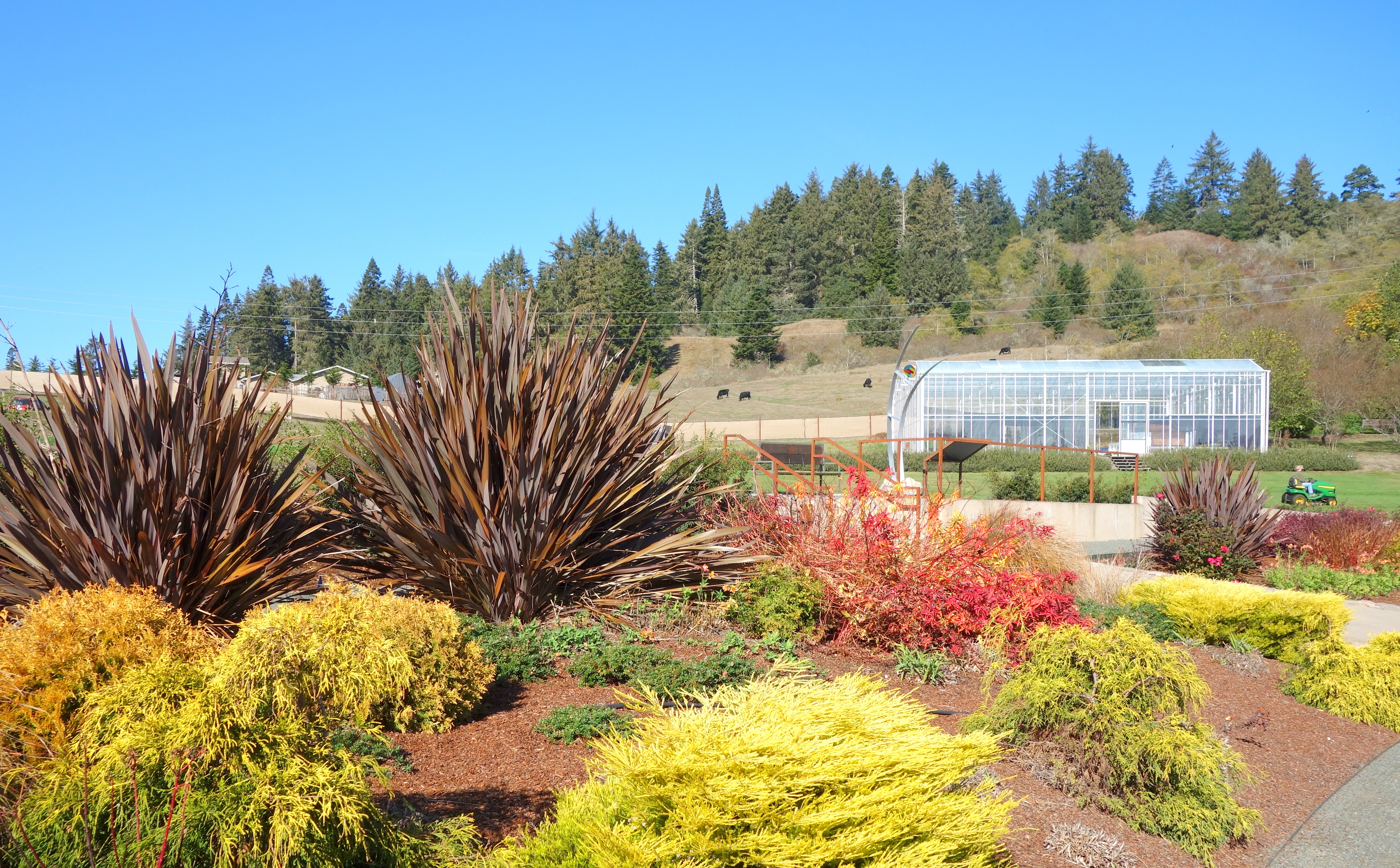
- Interactive map of Humboldt Botanical Garden
- Type: Botanical Gardens
- Location: 7707 Tompkins Hill Road, Eureka, California (garden); 317 3rd Street, Suite 5, Eureka, California 95501 (business office)
- Nearest city: Eureka, California
- Nearest town: Loleta, California
- Coordinates: 40°41′49.11″N 124°12′0.81″WNear highway 101 and adjacent to the College of the Redwoods campus
- Area: 44.5 acres
- Elevation: 100 feet; varying
- Established: 2003
- Opened: 2006
- Designer: Ron Lutsko
- Operator: Humboldt Botanical Garden Foundation
- Open: Daily 10:00 am until 5:00 with no entrance after 4:00 pm (November 1 through March 31, 10:00 am until 4:00 pm with no entrance after 3:00 pm). Closed New Year's Day, President's Day, Memorial Day, Independence Day, Labor Day, Thanksgiving, and Christmas. Dogs allowed on leash for an additional fee. Gardens may be booked as an events venue.
- Camp sites: No
- Hiking trails: 5 miles of hiking trails
- Paths: Yes
- Terrain: Mediterranean and Pacific Marine hill and dale allows for an arid Native Plant Garden, fern glade, woodlands, etc.
- Water: Streams
- Collections: Native conifer, Iris, and western lily (Lilium occidental)
- Budget: $573,268 Total Income 2025
- Parking: Free parking at the entrance
- Other information: Member of the American Public Gardens Association, the American Rhododendron Society, and the American Horticultural Society Reciprocal Admissions program
- Website: hbgf.org

The Humboldt Botanical Garden is a 44.5 acres (18 ha) botanical garden located four miles south of Eureka, California, United States. The Garden is near the South Bay portion of Humboldt Bay on the north side of the College of the Redwoods. Grading and site preparation began in August 2003. Featuring views of Humboldt Bay and the Pacific Ocean, the garden opened in 2006, with more development completed by 2008.

The Humboldt Botanical Garden (HBG) business office is located in downtown Eureka and is operated by the nonprofit Humboldt Botanical Garden Foundation which had over 1000 members in 2020 growing to 1667 members in 2025. HBG is a member of the American Public Gardens Association, the American Rhododendron Society, and the American Horticultural Society Reciprocal Admission program.

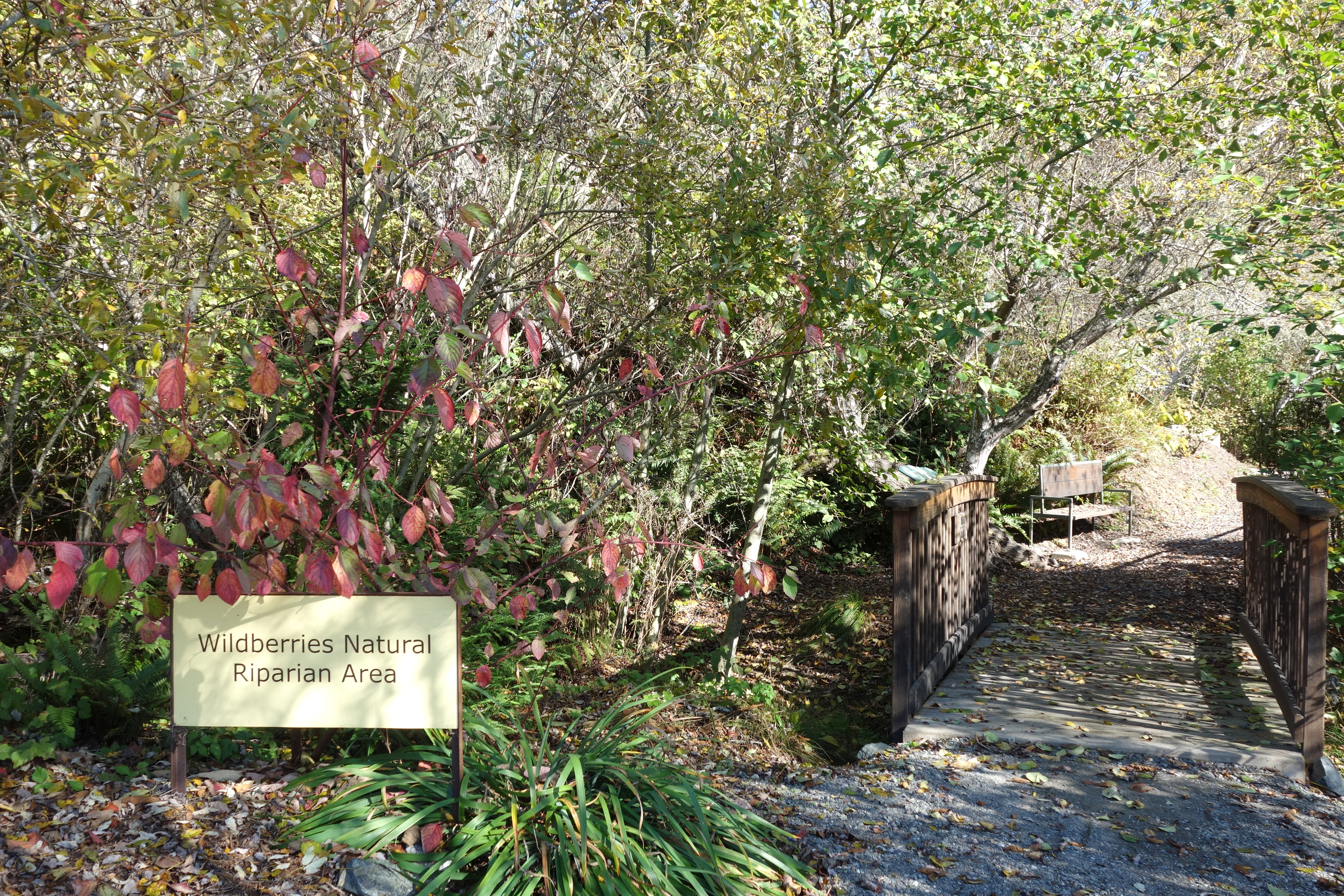
One of the wild areas of the gardens, 2013.

The garden is "a repository for many rare and hard to grow rhododendrons and their companion plants" according to a local office of the American Rhododendron Society. HBG is listed by the California Native Plant Society as one of the 17 California gardens with notable California native plant collections.

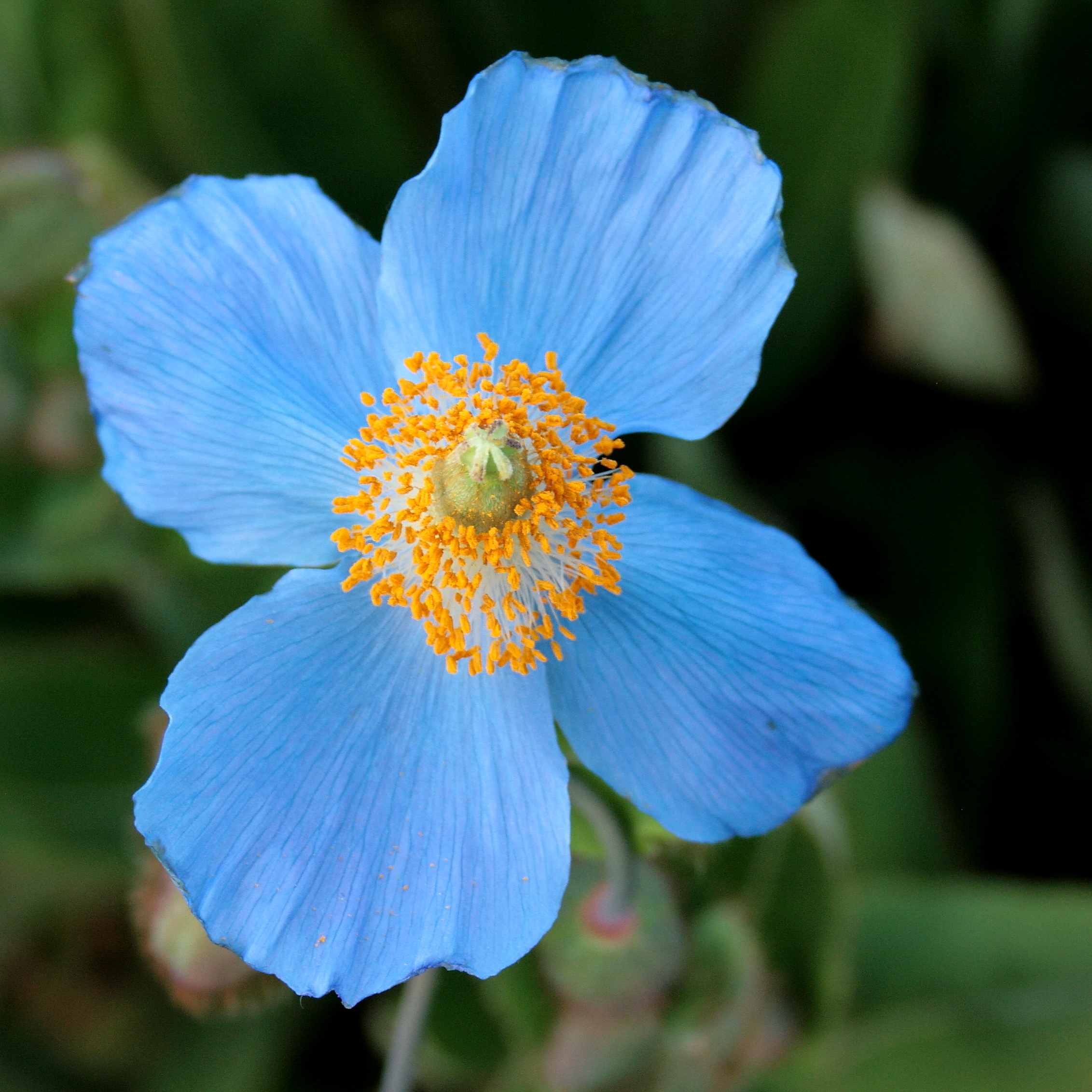
Meconopsis betonicifolia similar to that found at HBG in the Temperate Woodland Garden.

The Gardens were first organized in 1991. Originally a farm, the site is a grassy escarpment with meadows and woodland, and a year-round stream. The area's climate, which straddles Mediterranean and Pacific Marine allows for a diverse group of plants. Its Native Plant Garden has an emphasis on the Humboldt region, but includes plants from other geographic areas. Other gardens are: "All Happy Now" earth sculpture, meant to be walked in the way of meditation labyrinths; Riparian Area; Greenhouse; the Temperate Woodland Garden; the Ornamental Terrace Garden; Rose Garden; Heather Garden; Pollinator Garden; Mediterranean Allee and Native Tree garden; Crevice garden; plus five miles of hiking trails.

The Humboldt Botanical Garden focuses on maintaining complete native conifer, Iris and western lily (Lilium occidental) collections. Its mission statement is: "To cultivate a garden that provides an enjoyable discovery into the botanical world through education, participation and community service."

A summer music series and an annual native plant sale are held in the gardens. The gardens are available as a special events venue.

== Endangered Species Protection ==
In October 2019, six "Point Saint George" junipers (Juniperus communis) were planted. These originated from a cliff in Del Norte County at the tip of Point Saint George north of Crescent City, California and is now extinct in the wild and uncommon in cultivation.

In March 2023, HBG became the northernmost site for safeguarding the state-listed endangered species Vine Hill manzanita (Arctostaphylos densiflora) which is native to Sebastopol, Sonoma County, California.

Another critically endangered species is the Wollemi pine (Wollemia nobilis), a native of Australia which has been planted at HBG. It was known only from fossils until found near Sydney, Australia in 1994.

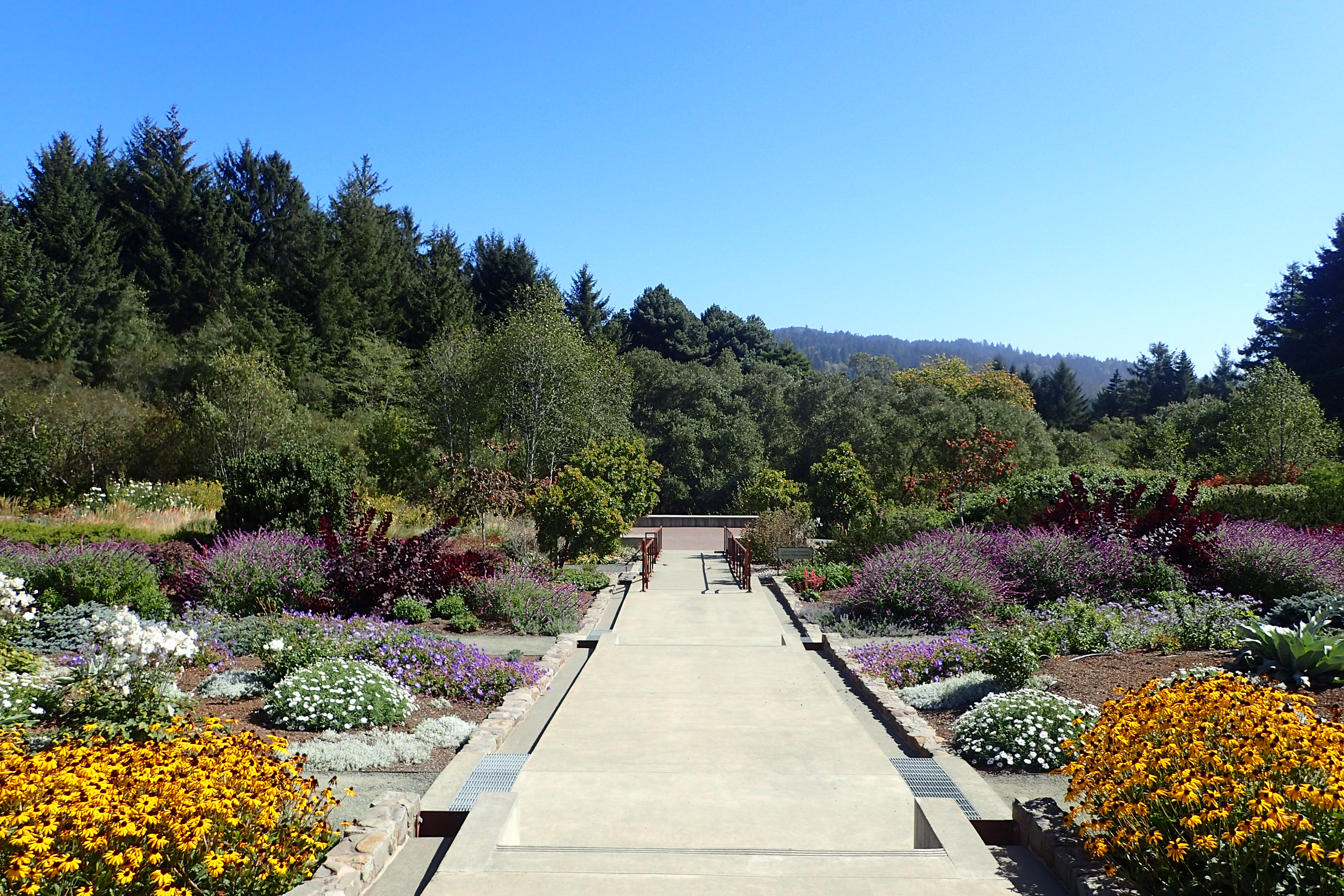
Humboldt Botanical Garden native plants

== Research ==
Active research in support of conservation, general research, and education is supported. As of 2024, this has included research into Monterey pines (Pinus radiata), habitats for native pollinators and their flower selection, removal of invasive species, and studying the effects of potential predation on foraging habits of bumblebees.

Research has included collaborations with Wright State University, Academy of the Redwoods Environmental Club, and California Polytechnic University Humboldt.

== See also ==
- List of botanical gardens in California
- Images of Specimens in the Humboldt Botanical Garden
