= Balboa Park Gardens =

Cultivated areas of Balboa Park in San Diego, California, U.S.

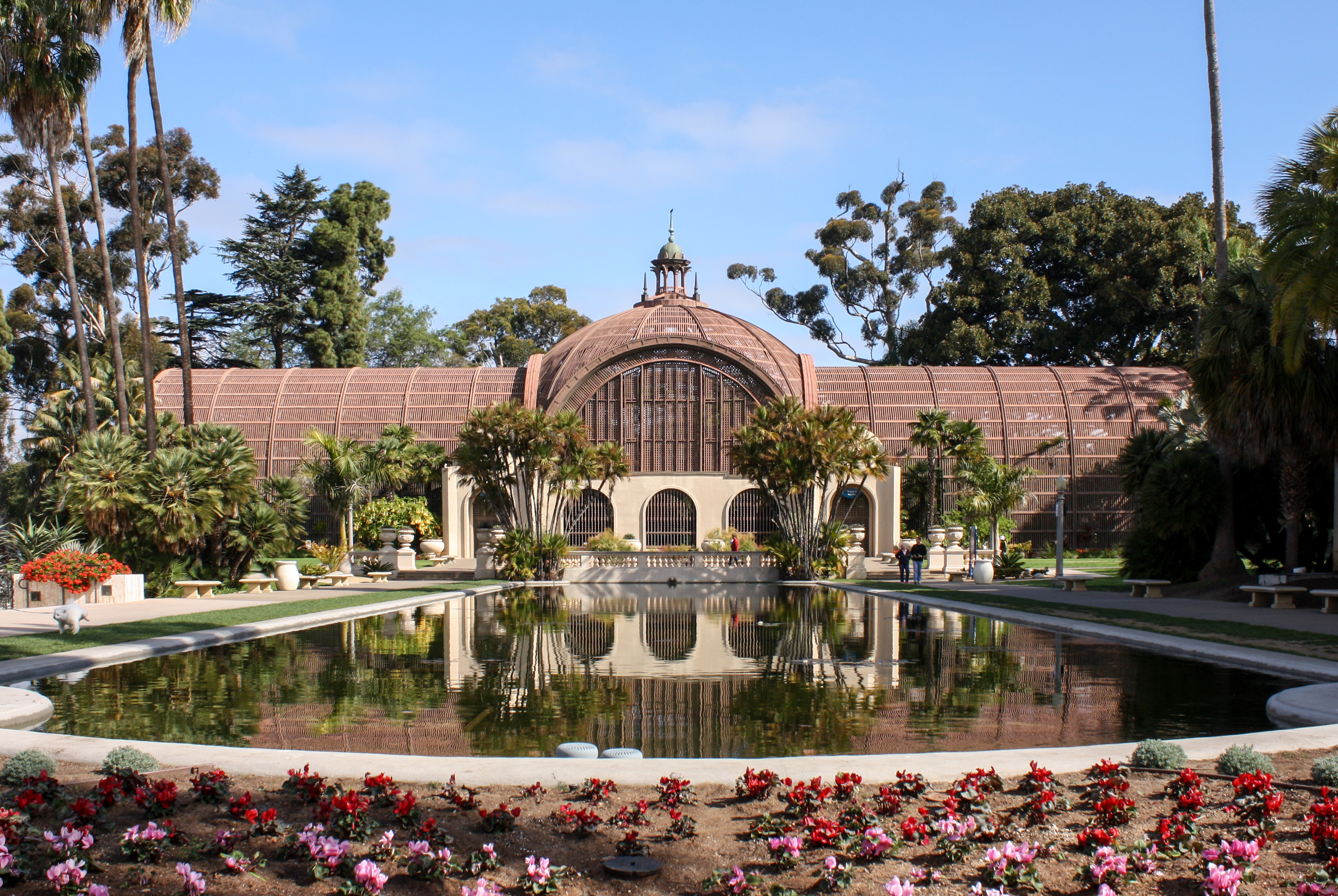
- The Botanical Building, Balboa Park

- Location within San Diego Location within California Location within the United States
- Type: Botanical garden
- Location: Balboa Park, San Diego, California
- Nearest city: San Diego, California
- Coordinates: 32°43′53″N 117°08′42″W
- Area: 1,200 acres (490 ha)
- Created: 1915
- Status: Open year round
- Website: Balboa Park Foundation

Balboa Park Gardens are cultivated areas of Balboa Park in San Diego, California.

== Gardens ==
There are multiple individual gardens throughout the park, including Alcazar Gardens, the Botanical Building and Reflecting Pool, the Cactus Garden, the Casa del Rey Moro Garden, the Inez Grant Parker Memorial Rose Garden, the Japanese Friendship Garden, the Marston House Garden, Palm Canyon, and Zoro Garden. In addition, the San Diego Zoo includes a noteworthy collection of plants.

== Plants ==
Balboa Park contains 350 species of plants on 1,200 acres (490 ha) of rolling hills and canyons, with approximately 1,500 trees. Many of the trees were selected and planted by horticulturalist Kate Sessions, often referred to as "the Mother of Balboa Park".

== Gallery ==
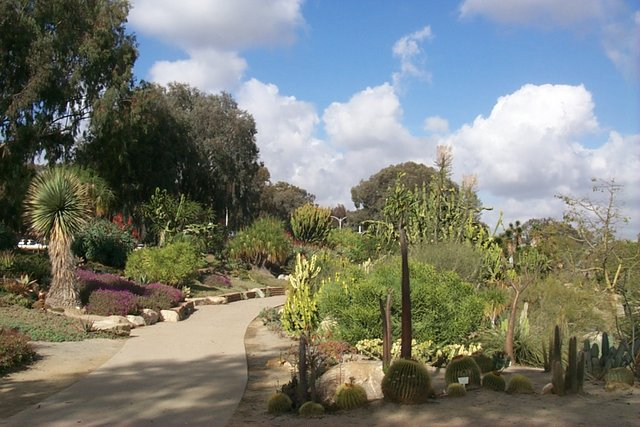
Desert Cactus Garden, Balboa Park

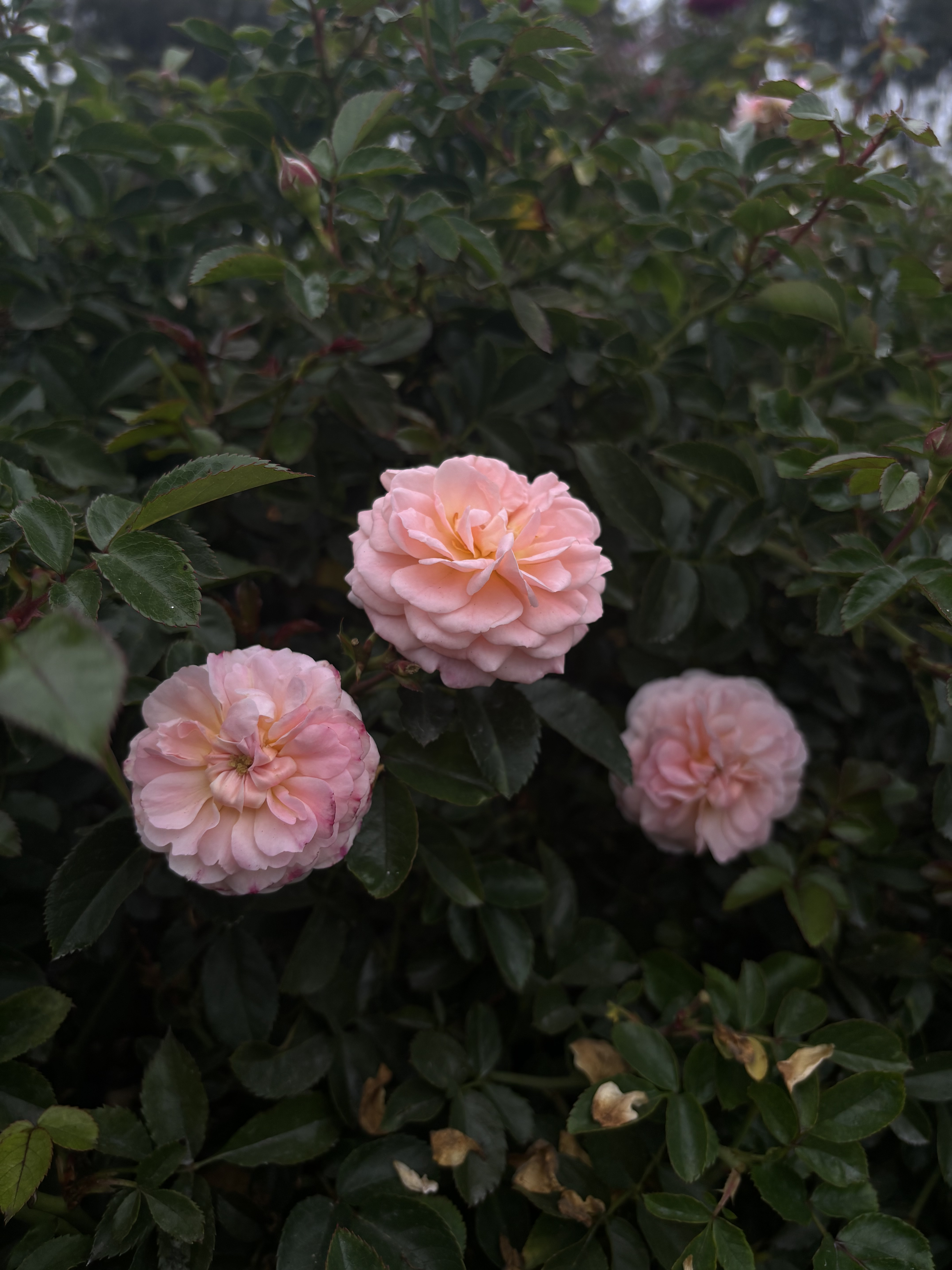
Closeup of pink roses at the Rose Garden in Balboa Park

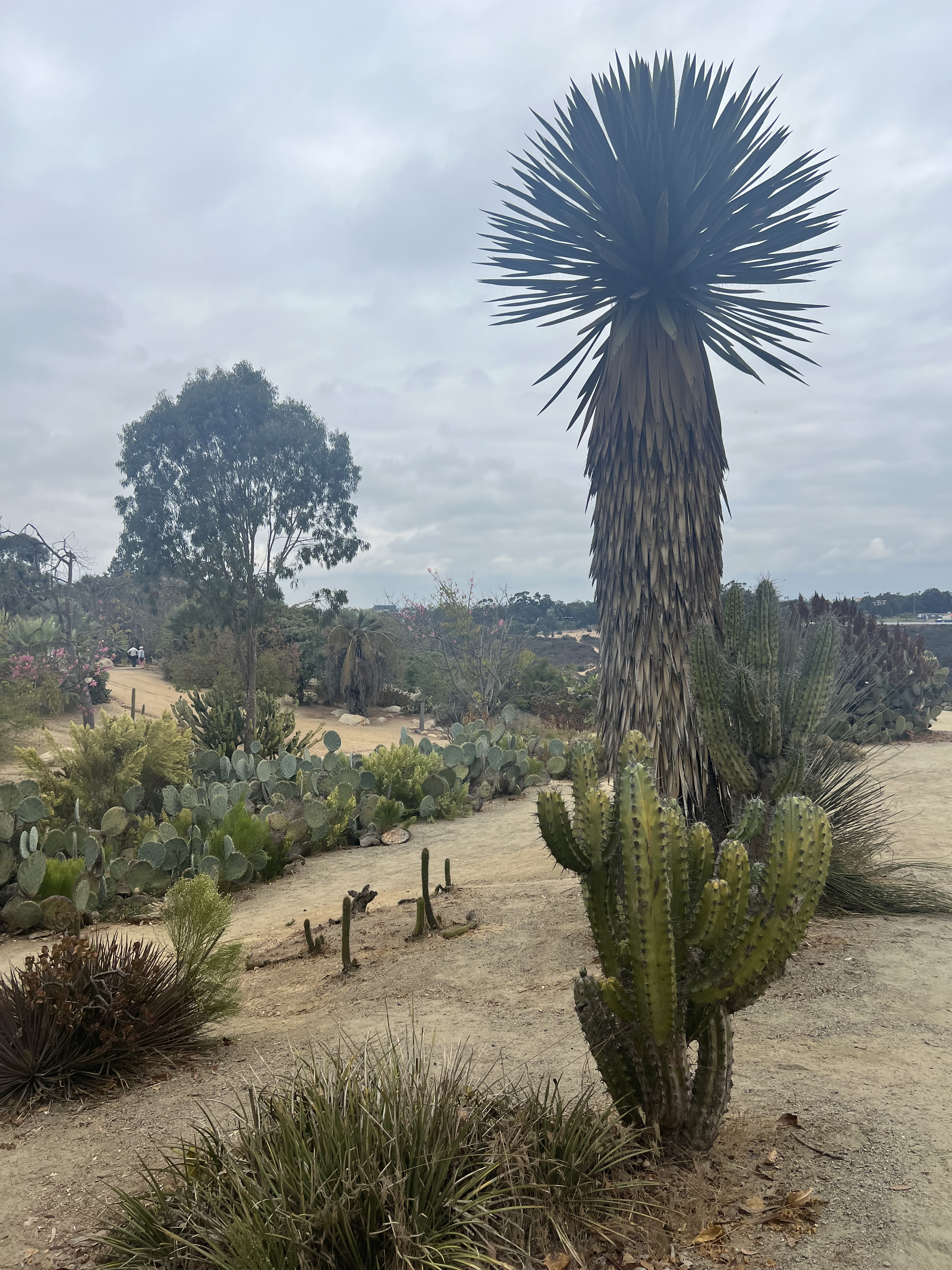
Balboa Park Cactus Garden

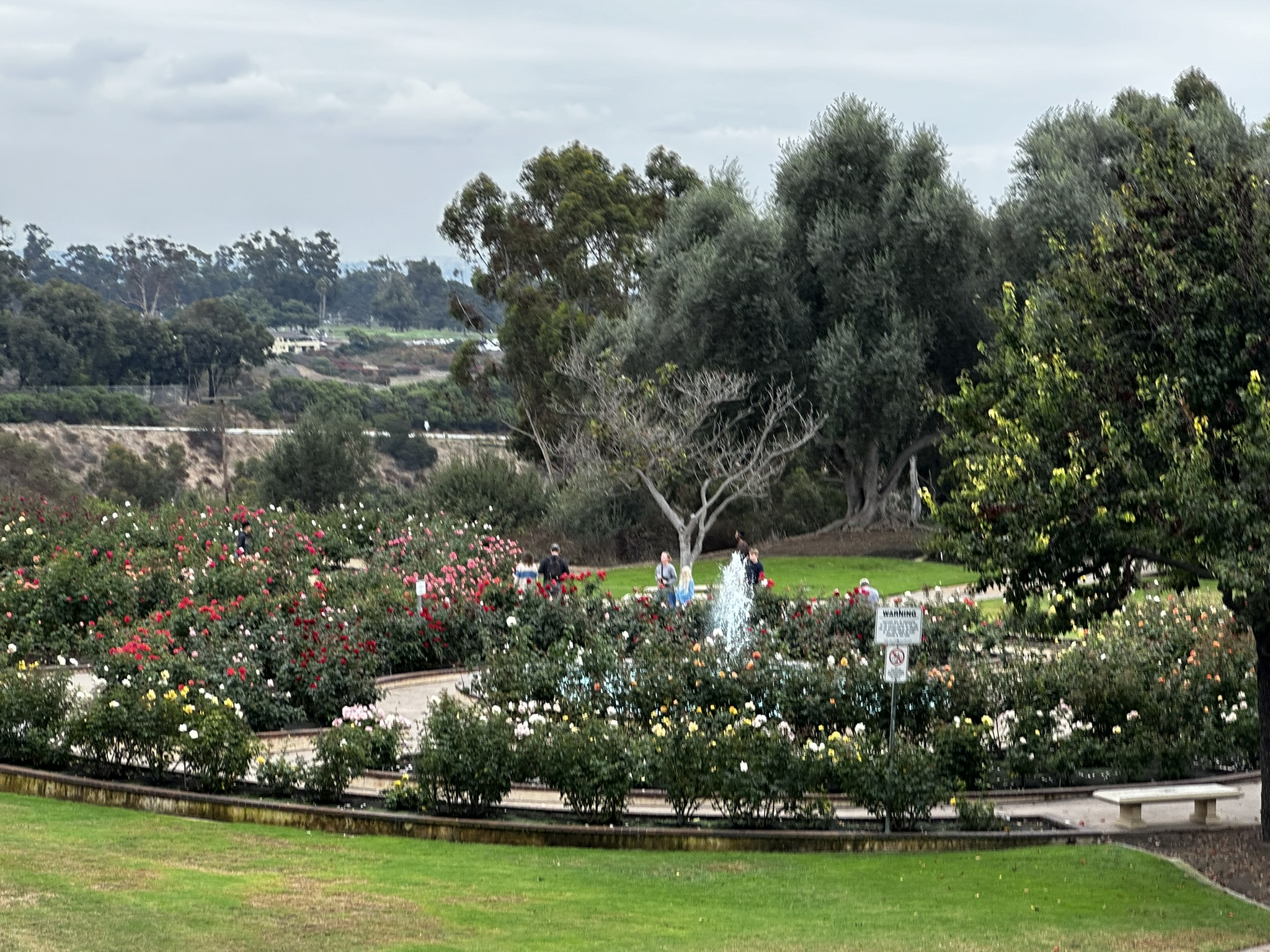
Overview of the southwestern perspective of the Grant Parker Memorial Rose Garden

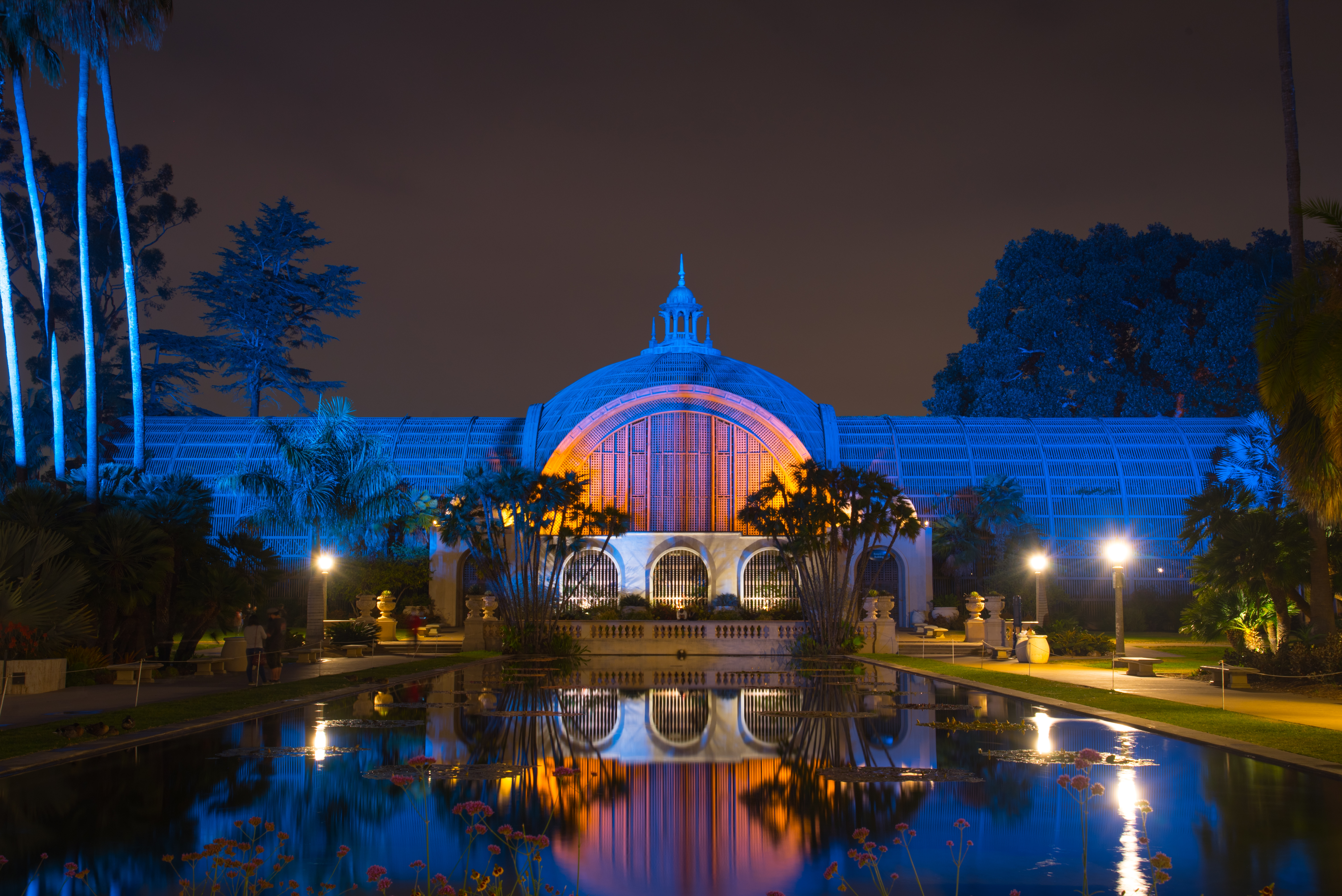
Botanical Building at night

== See also ==
- Kate Sessions
- List of Parks in San Diego
- Gold Gulch
- List of botanical gardens and arboretums in California
