= Arlington Garden =

Botanical garden in Pasadena, California

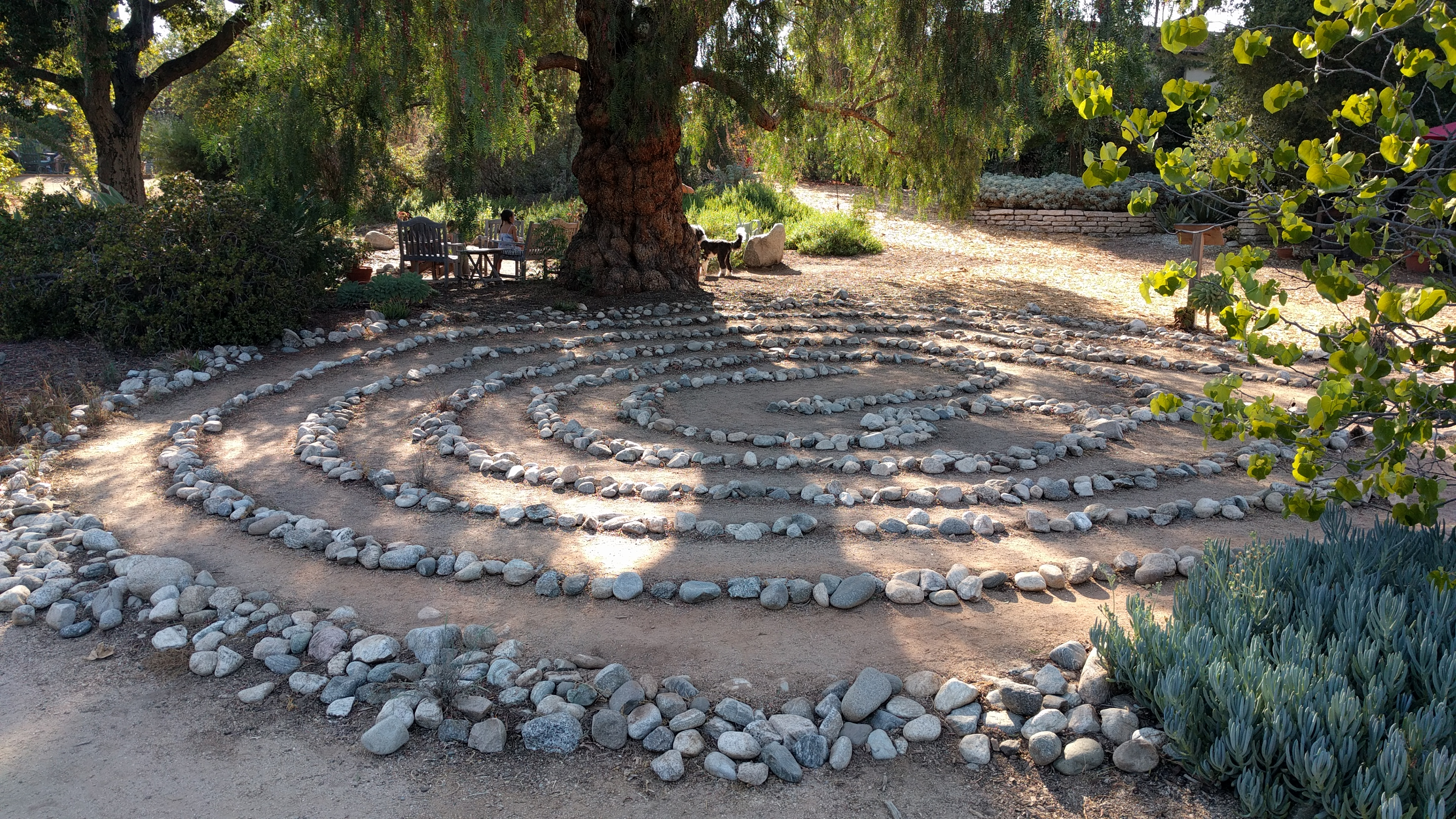
- Arlington Garden Labyrinth

- Location within California Location within the United States
- Interactive map of Arlington Garden
- Type: Botanical garden
- Location: Pasadena, California
- Nearest city: Pasadena, California
- Coordinates: 34°07′43″N 118°09′21″W
- Area: 3 acres (1.2 ha)
- Created: 2005
- Operator: Arlington Garden in Pasadena
- Open: 8am-6pm
- Status: Open year round
- Website: Official website

The Arlington Garden is a 3-acre (1.2 ha) botanical garden, located in Pasadena, California. It is Pasadena's only dedicated free public garden. The garden was designed by Mayita Dinos; planting was first begun in 2005.

== History ==
In 1902, the businessman John Durand purchased the site. From then to 1964, the property was home to the renowned Durand Mansion. The mansion was purchased and demolished by Caltrans in 1964. Caltrans used the lot to store heavy equipment during the construction of the Long Beach Freeway (I-710) expansion. The three-acre lot remained vacant since 1967. In 2003, Caltrans leased the lot to the City of Pasadena for city purposes.

Arlington Garden is located on the site of a former staging ground for the 710 freeway. The freeway was halted due to community opposition, but the denuded, compacted lot remained empty until the birth of the garden in 2005.

Pasadena City Councilmember Steve Madison first approached a group of local community members, including the garden's founders Betty and Charles “Kicker” McKenney, in 2002. His goal was to solicit advice on what to do with the empty lot. After discussion with the community, and some key inspiration from Betty, it was decided that the site would be turned into a garden.

With the help of former City Manager Cynthia Kurtz, Betty and Charles worked with designer Mayita Dinos to break ground on the garden in 2005. They were inspired by Jan Smithen's book Sun-Drenched Gardens: The Mediterranean Style, and, in the summer of 2005, the first of many plantings began. Their goal was to create a public, water-wise garden that celebrates Southern California's mediterranean climate. The garden they founded demonstrates how beautiful and practical a well-planned, water-conserving and climate-appropriate garden can be.

Over the years, the mission of the garden has evolved to include promoting urban wildlife habitat and demonstrating the use of regenerative gardening techniques, which include refraining from the use of herbicides, pesticides, or chemical fertilizers.

The garden was rezoned as open space in 2016 and is maintained and supported by the nonprofit group Arlington Garden in Pasadena a 501(c)(3) which hired executive director, Michelle Matthews in 2017.

== Points of interest ==
The garden includes thousands of California-native plants such as poppies, sunflowers, cactus and succulents, orchards of orange and olive trees, and many more species. It also includes a variety of benches and tables, birdbaths and statuary.

On November 15, 2008, Yoko Ono's art installation Wish Tree for Pasadena were donated to Arlington Garden and permanently installed there.

On October 8, 2010, a classical seven circuit Labyrinth was built with the help of the Sophomores at Mayfield Senior School. It takes roughly five minutes slow walking to navigate the labyrinth.

September 2019 a Batchelder Craftsman Tile Fountain was installed and features custom tiles made by Cha-Rie Tang of Pasadena Craftsman Tile.

== Awards ==
Betty and Charles McKenney, co-founders of the garden, were honored as the 2008 Contemporary History Makers by Pasadena Museum of History.

The Arlington Garden received 2015 Best Public Garden Award, which was awarded by LA Weekly.

== See also ==
- List of botanical gardens and arboretums in California
- Storrier-Stearns Japanese Garden is located across the street from the Arlington Garden.
