= Labadi (disambiguation) =

Labadi is a city in Ghana. It may also refer to:

- Labadi Beach, beach in Ghana
- Mahmoud Labadi (1940–2014), Palestinian journalist and politician
