= Harland Hand Memorial Garden =

Botanical garden in El Cerrito, California

Coordinates: 37.91436°N 122.29096°W

The Harland Hand Memorial Garden is a one-half acre (0.20 hectares) botanical garden built on a hillside of the El Cerrito Hills in El Cerrito, California. The garden is known for its dramatic color combinations and panoramic view over San Francisco Bay.

== Overview ==
The garden is privately owned but opens several days a year to groups by prior arrangement. It uses concrete across many levels to mimic the gray granite glacial washes of the High Sierra's Silver Lake. Its planting is varied, with succulents and more temperate plants, trees, and shrubs, while it also hosts a population of Pacific tree frogs.

Harland Hand (1922–1998) was a school teacher, plantsman, and garden designer. He was president of the California Horticultural Society, a co-founder of Pacific Horticulture, and a board member of the University of California Botanical Garden.

== See also ==
- List of botanical gardens in the United States
