= Eddy Arboretum =

Arboretum in California, United States

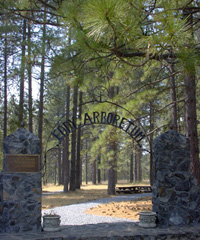
- Entrance to the arboretum

- Location within California Location within the United States
- Type: Public
- Location: Placerville, California, US
- Nearest city: Placerville, California
- Coordinates: 38°43′47″N 120°47′56″W
- Created: 1926
- Status: Open year round

The Eddy Arboretum is located at the Institute of Forest Genetics in the Sierra Nevada near Placerville, in El Dorado County, eastern California.

== Collection ==
The arboretum contains what is claimed to be the best-documented collection of native and exotic pines in the world, in addition to many other native and exotic conifers.

78 pine species, 24 fir species, and many other conifer species are growing on the arboretum's grounds. Some species collections sample a wide range of genetic diversity, such as the native California conifers Pinus lambertiana and Pinus coulteri.

The Arboretum's first plantings were made in 1926. Because genetic diversity is the raw material for breeding, the Arboretum assembled as many pine species and varieties as possible. The origins of individual seeds were recorded, often mapping the location of each parent tree.

== Access ==
The Eddy Arboretum is part of the Pacific Southwest Research Station of the United States Forest Service. It is open to the public during business hours, excluding weekends and holidays.

== See also ==
- Arboreta in California
- Botanical gardens in California
- List of botanical gardens in the United States
- List of California native plants
