= San Luis Obispo Botanical Garden =

Botanical garden in San Luis Obispo County, California

Coordinates: 35°20′27″N 120°43′14″W

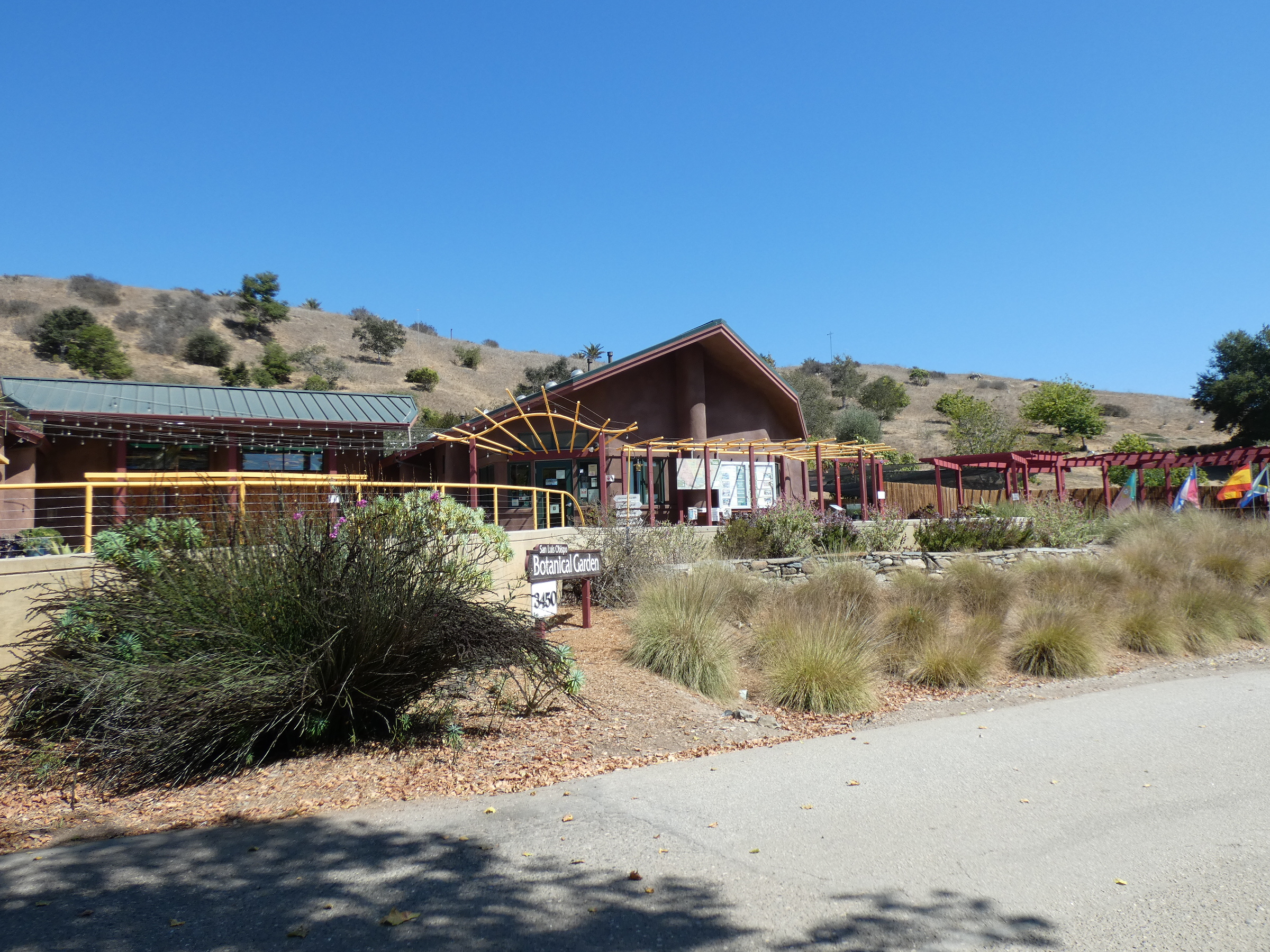
- Visitor center.
- Interactive map of San Luis Obispo Botanical Garden
- Location: San Luis Obispo County
- Area: 150-acre (61 ha)
- Website: slobg.org

The San Luis Obispo Botanical Garden is a botanical garden located in the rolling hills of El Chorro Regional Park, between San Luis Obispo and Morro Bay in San Luis Obispo County, within the Central Coast of California region. Its grounds, when completed, will be a 150-acre (61 ha) collection of gardens displaying the diverse plant life of the five Mediterranean climate zones of the world; the Mediterranean Basin, and regions of California, Chile, Australia, and South Africa.

== History ==
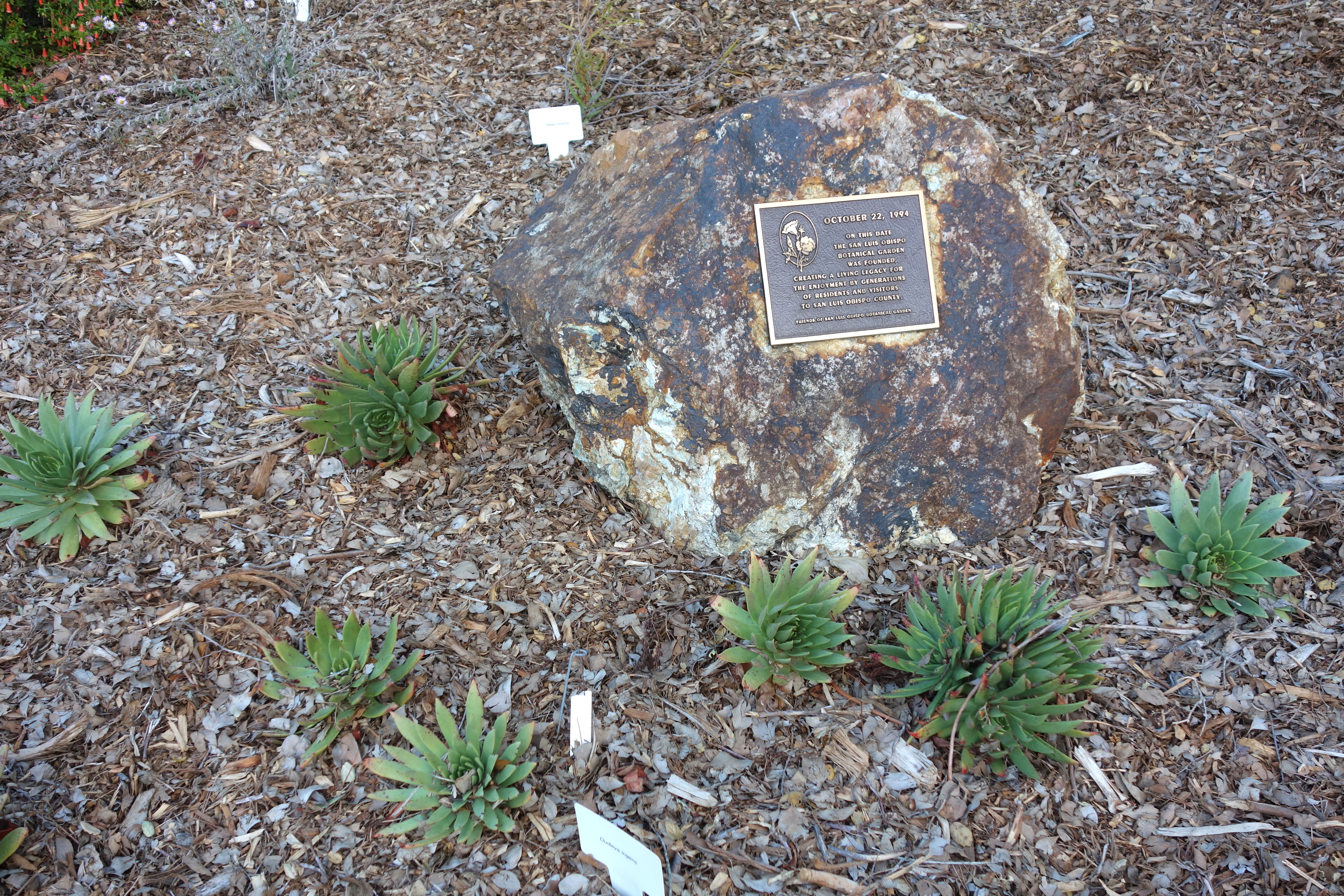
Foundational plaque.

The first idea for the garden began in 1989, and in 1991 the Friends of SLO Botanical Garden was incorporated. In 1993, a 40-year renewable lease for 150 acres (61 ha) was signed with San Luis Obispo County. The 2-acre (8,100 m^{2}) Preview Garden was opened in 1997.

The master plan was completed in 1998, as was the greenhouse and nursery. The 4,000-square-foot (370 m^{2}) green, sustainably-built educational center was opened in 2007.

Work is ongoing to build the entire garden. When complete, the San Luis Obispo Botanical Garden will be one of the largest botanical gardens in the Western United States.

== Gardens ==
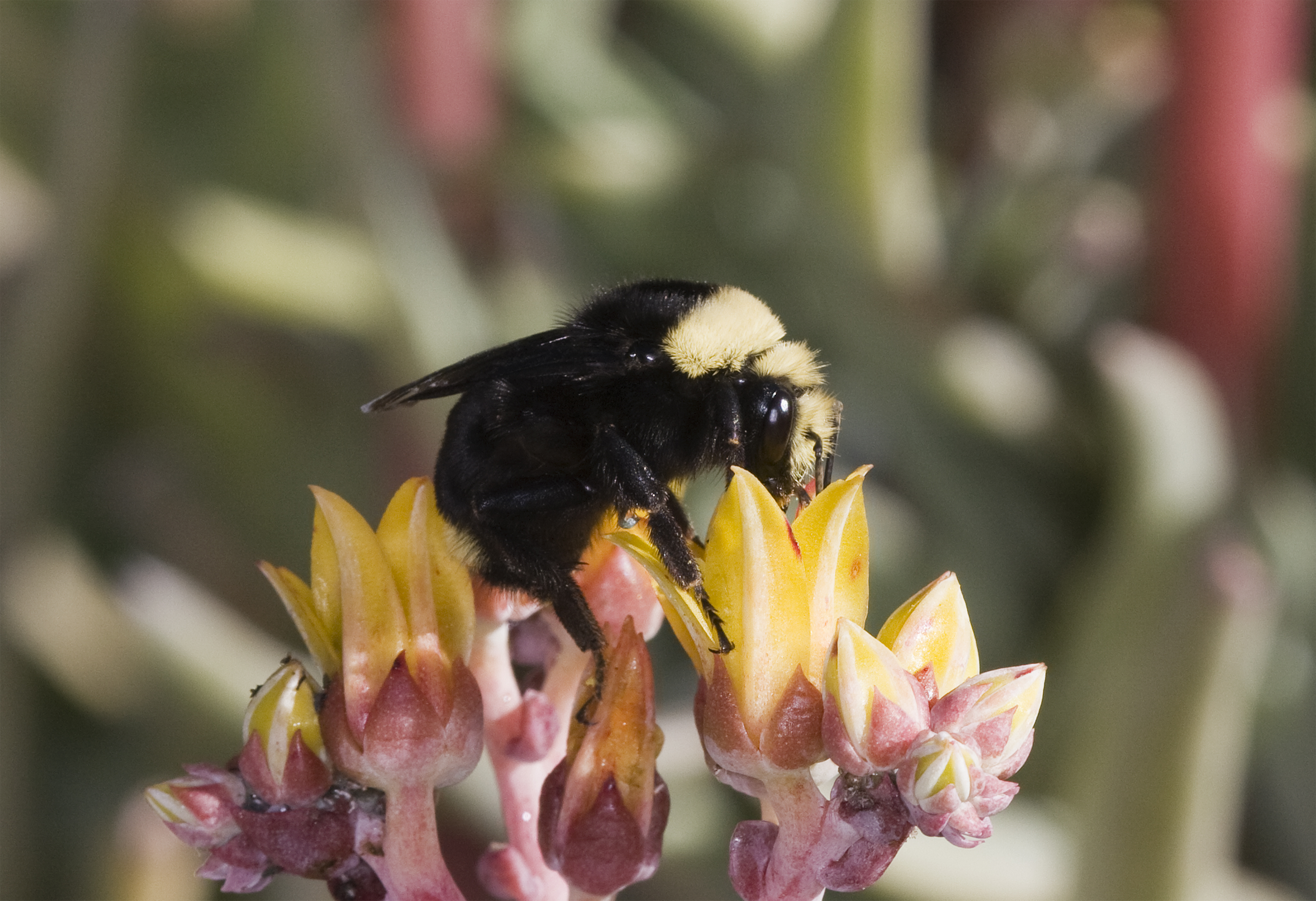
Yellow-faced Bumblebee (Bombus vosnesenskii) on Lanceleaf liveforever flower (Dudleya lanceolata-Calif. native.)

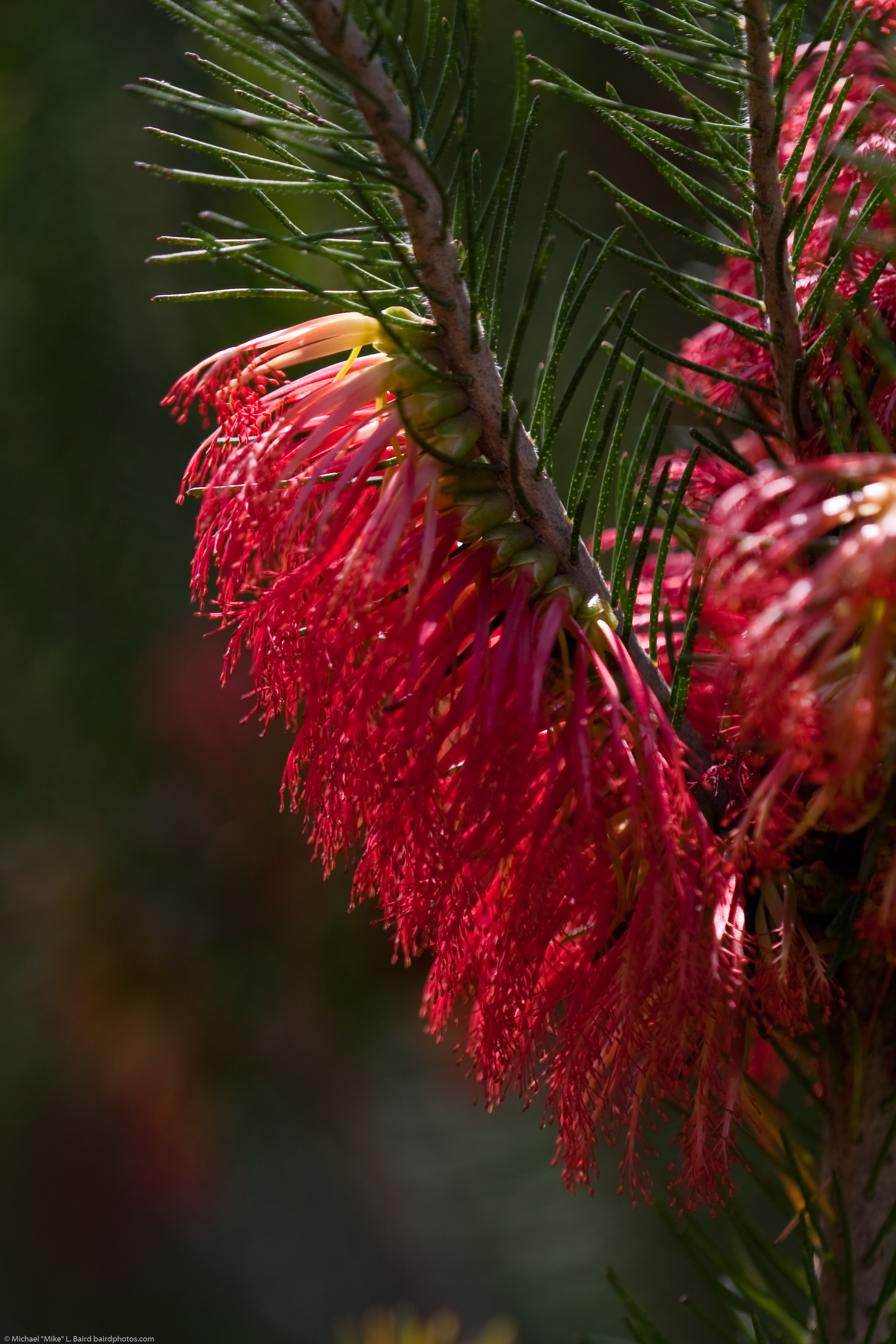
One-sided Bottlebrush (Calothamnus quadrifidus), native to Southwest Australia.

=== Mediterranean gardens ===
The San Luis Obispo Botanical Garden is developing gardens of the five ecoregions in the Mediterranean forests, woodlands, and scrub Biome:

- The California chaparral and woodlands garden will be 47.40 acres (19.18 ha) with nine collections: oak woodland, mixed evergreen forest, grassland, coastal scrub, chaparral, sycamore glen, agave-yucca rise, riparian forest and wetland. It will display specimens from Baja California northward to a point about halfway between San Francisco and Eureka.
- The Mediterranean Basin garden 11.50 acres (4.65 ha) will be organized into three collections; oasis, Canary Island crest, and Mediterranean slope.
- The Chilean Matorral garden 20.43 acres (8.27 ha) will be devoted to the flora of central Chile with seven separate collections; araucaria crest, southern beech forest, coastal matorral, puya palisades, Chilean arroyo, Chilean mixed forest and Chilean palm grove.
- The Cape Province-Western Cape of South Africa garden 7.63 acres (3.09 ha) will contain three collections: Cape succulents (the Cape of Good Hope area is home to the richest succulent flora in the world), floral carpet of the Cape and a tapestry of diverse vegetation woven into a continuous shrub land.
- The Southwest Australia garden 12.50 acres (5.06 ha) will hold four collections from two areas of Australia; a garden of the protea family, kwongan (small groupings of eucalyptus woodlands and associated thickets), karri, marri, and jarrah forest (a display of giant eucalyptus trees that rank among the tallest trees in the world) and grass tree slope.

=== Theme gardens ===
- The Orchard, Vineyard and Entry Plantings 12 acres (4.9 ha) will highlight plants of economic importance: orchards of grapes, walnuts, pistachios, olives and other productive plants of the Mediterranean climate areas with naturalized flowering ground covers from each region. It will also include an avenue of Mediterranean cypress intermixed with a broad leaf evergreen canopy lines the entry road.
- The Gardens of Exploration 11 acres (4.5 ha) will contain groupings of demonstration gardens. Five general areas have been identified: horticultural therapy, ecology, biology, cultural influences and horticultural opportunities.

== Gallery ==
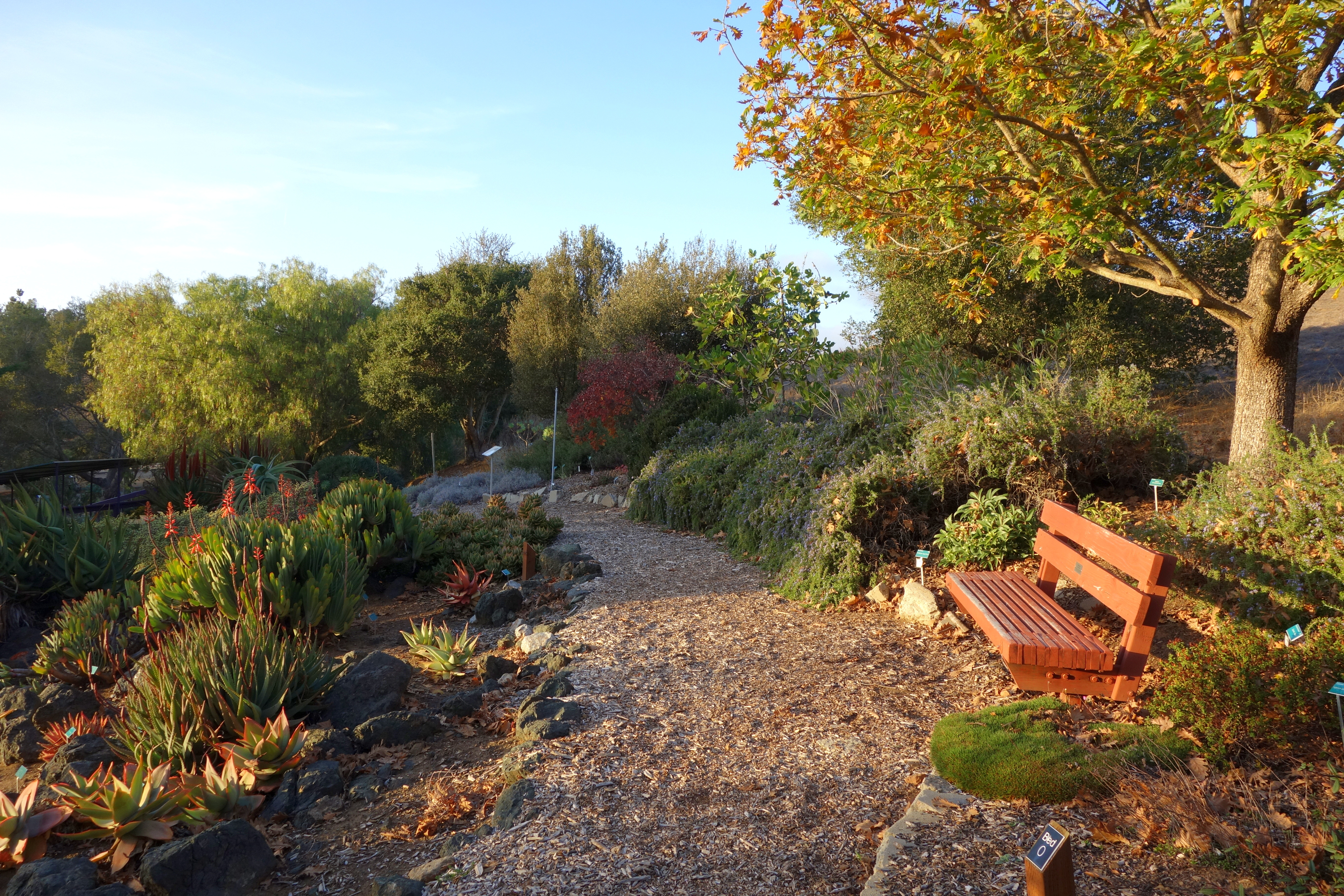
One of the paths in the garden.

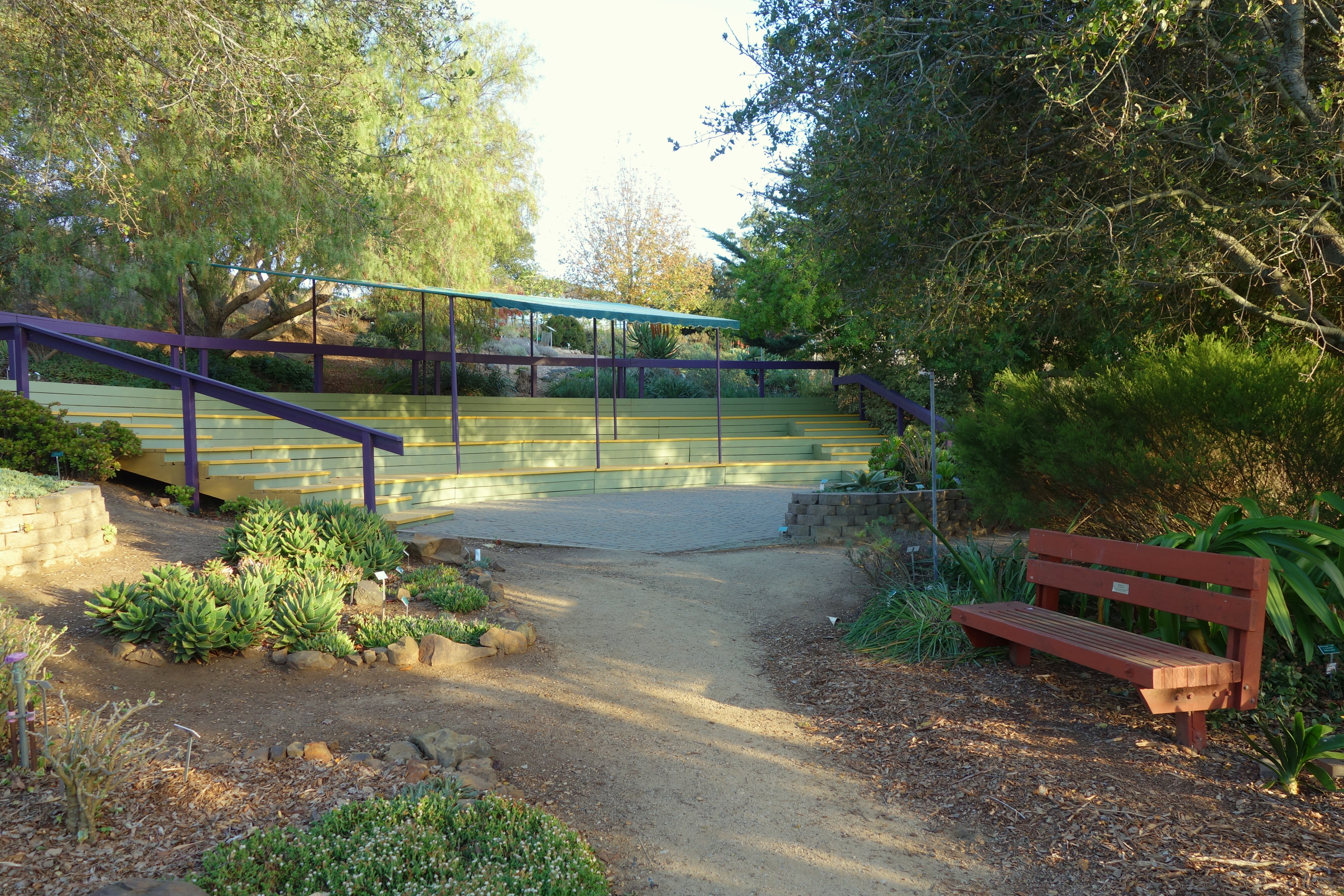
Group seating area.

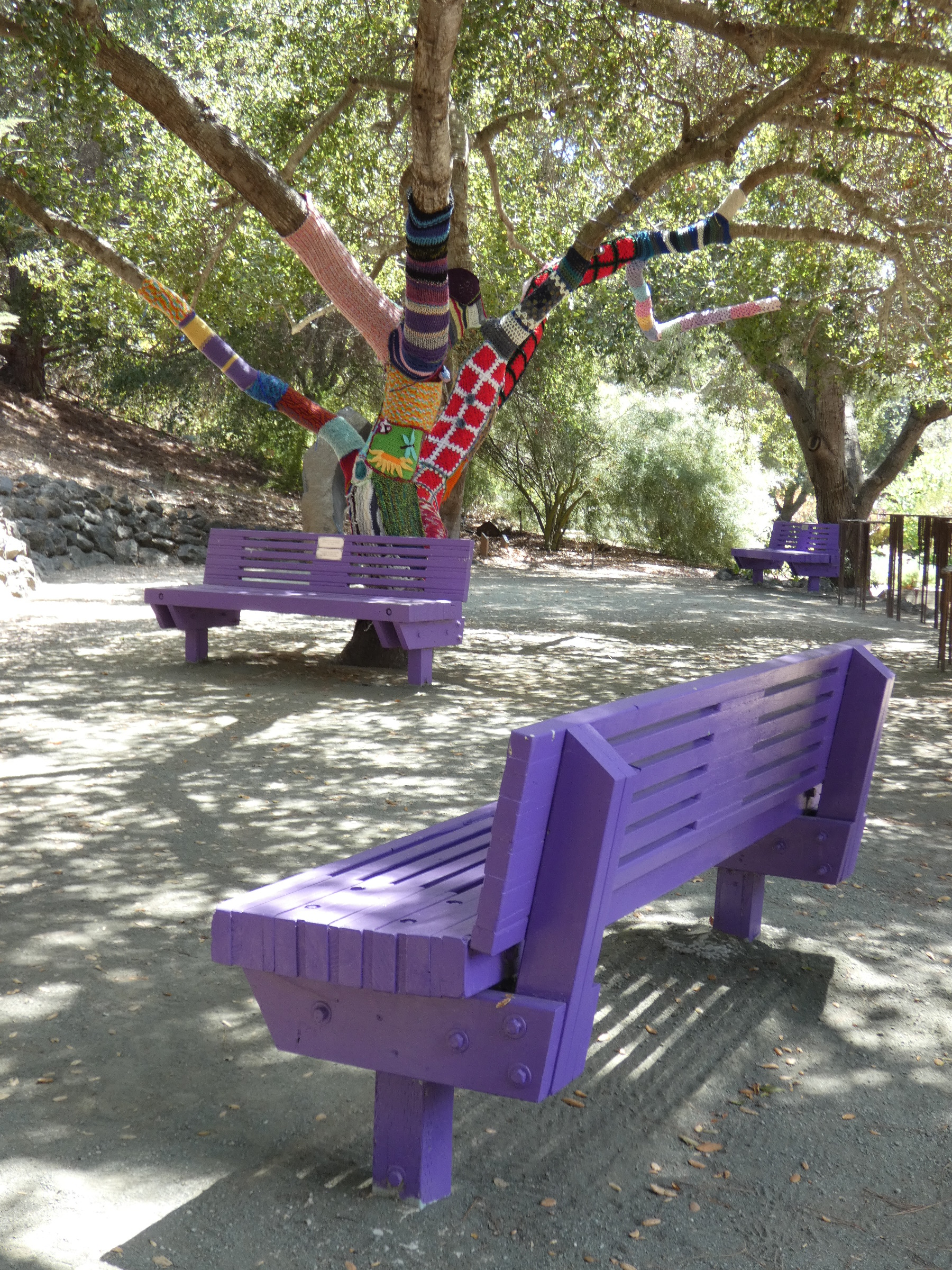
Artwork in the garden.

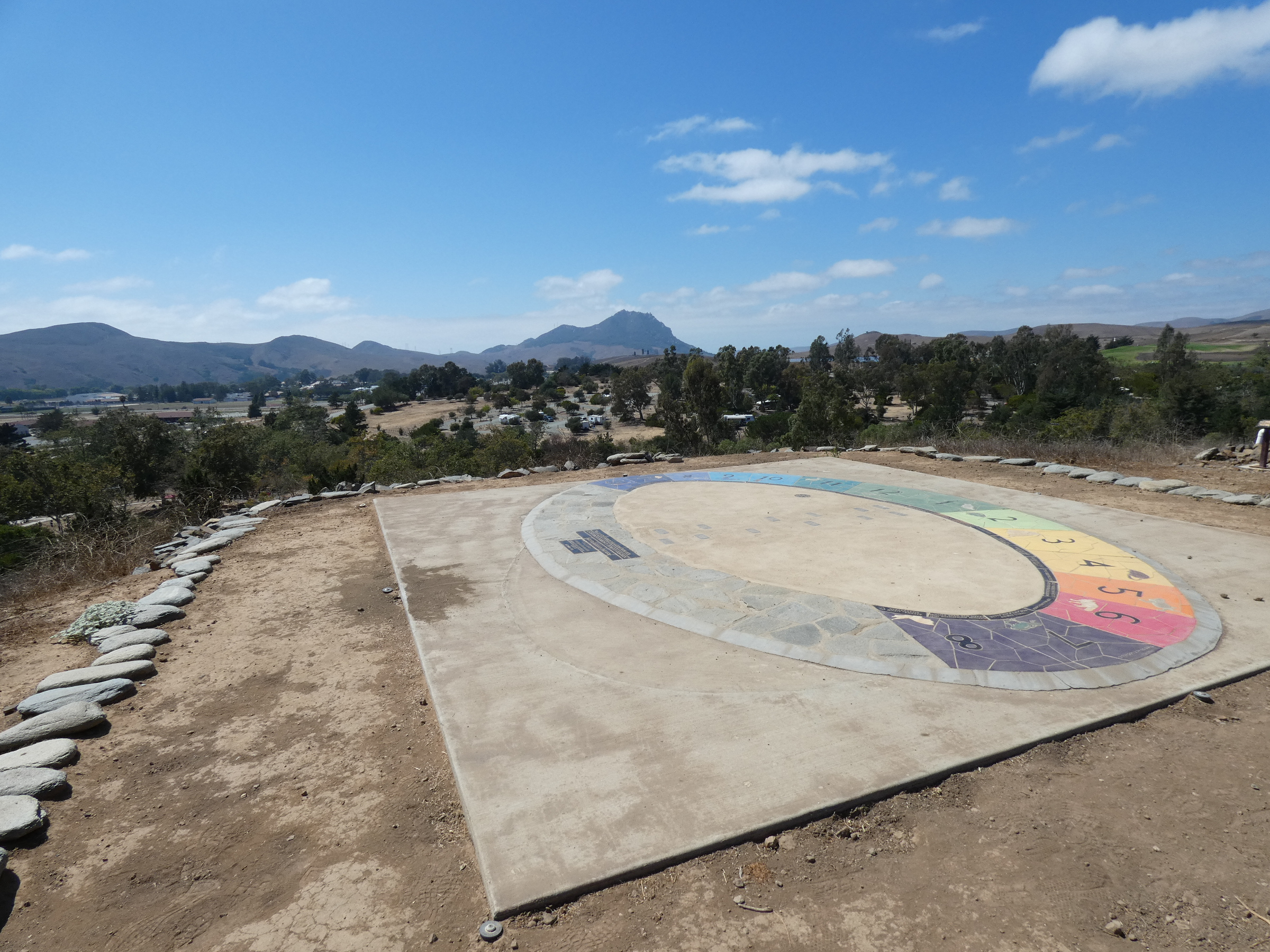
Discovery Trail

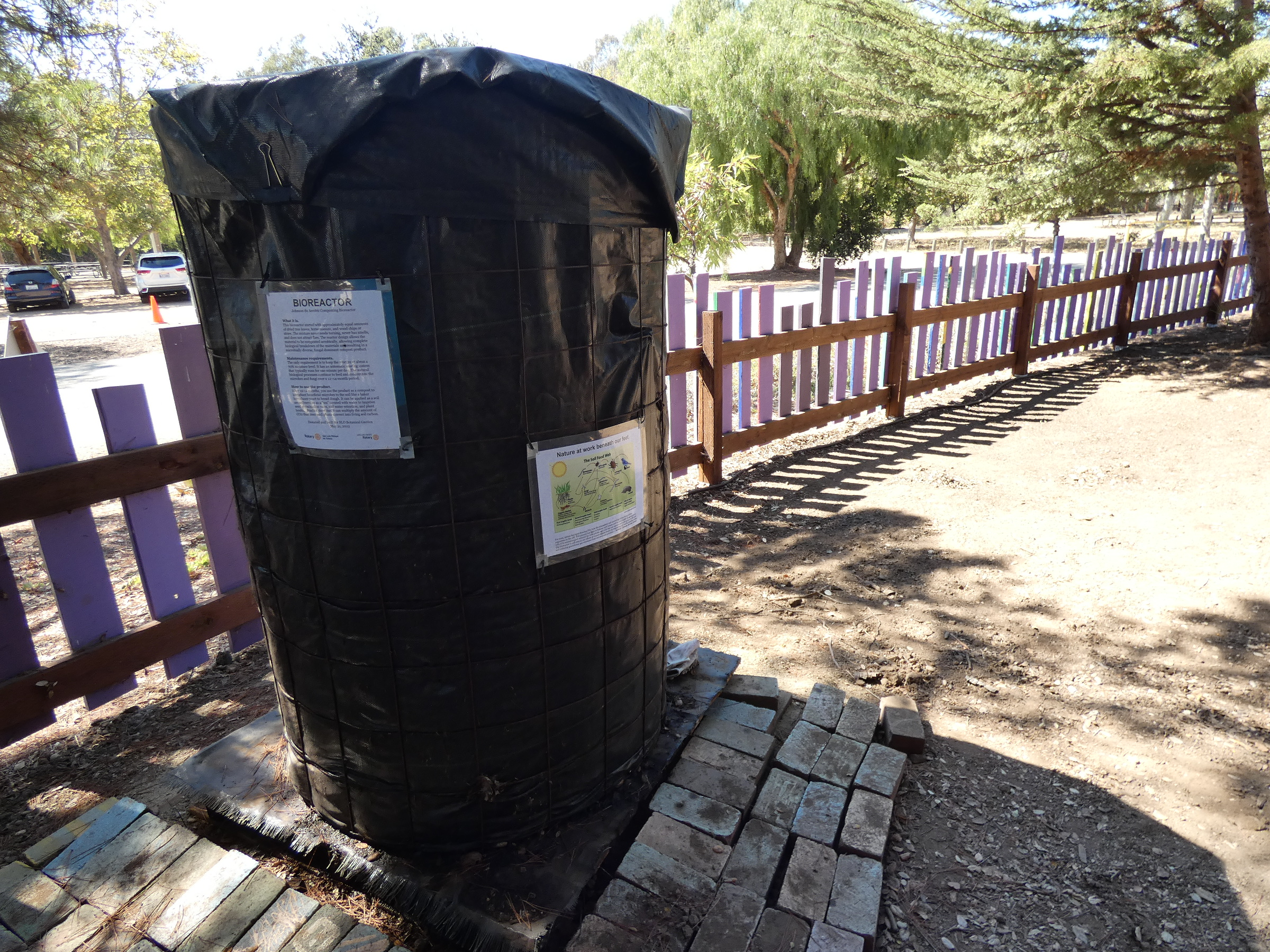
Bioreactor onsite.

== See also ==
- List of California native plants
- Index: Mediterranean forests, woodlands, and scrub – biome, ecoregions, and flora.
- List of botanical gardens in the United States
