= Jensen Botanical Gardens =

Botanical garden in California

Coordinates: 38.6394°N 121.3210°W

The Charles C. Jensen Botanical Gardens are botanical gardens located at 8520 Fair Oaks Boulevard, Carmichael, California. They are open during the daylight hours without charge.

The gardens exhibit a variety of flora including camellias, dogwoods, azaleas, and rhododendrons.

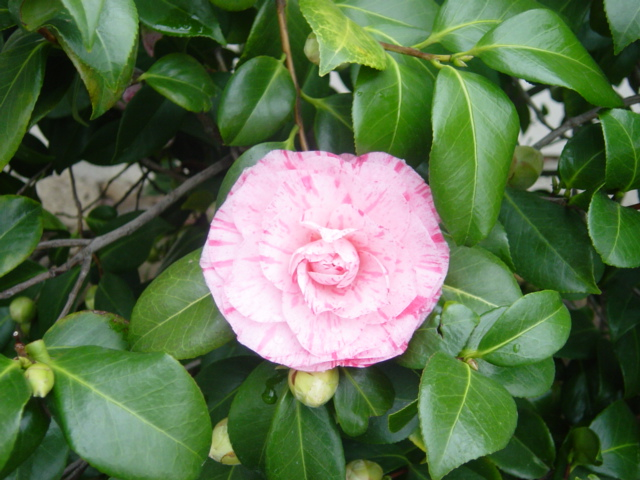

== See also ==
- List of botanical gardens in the United States
