= Labadie Arboretum =

Arboretum in Oakland, California

Coordinates: 37°47′37.98″N 122°10′4.48″W

The Emile L. Labadie Arboretum is an arboretum operated by the Landscape Horticulture department of Merritt College, 12500 Campus Drive, Oakland, California, United States.

Emile Labadie was an esteemed professor in the department and also worked for the San Mateo Department of Agriculture.

== See also ==
- List of botanical gardens in the United States
