= Mina Pulsifer =

American artist (1899–1989)

Mina Pulsifer (nee Wilhelmina Pulsifer Schutz; August 3, 1899 – February 14, 1989) was an American printmaker. Her work is included in the collections of the Whitney Museum of American Art and the National Gallery of Art, Washington.

== Early life ==
Born as Wilhelmina Pulsifer Schutz on August 3, 1899, Pulsifer attended the Kansas City Art Institute before marrying retired Major George Pulsifer.

== Career ==
By 1944, Pulsifer was appointed president of the San Diego Art Guild and her art was included in exhibitions at the California Pacific International Exposition, the Golden Gate International Exposition, La Jolla Art Center, and the San Diego Fine Art Gallery.

== Collections ==
Her work is included in the collections of the Whitney Museum of American Art and the National Gallery of Art, Washington.
