= San Diego Repertory Theatre =

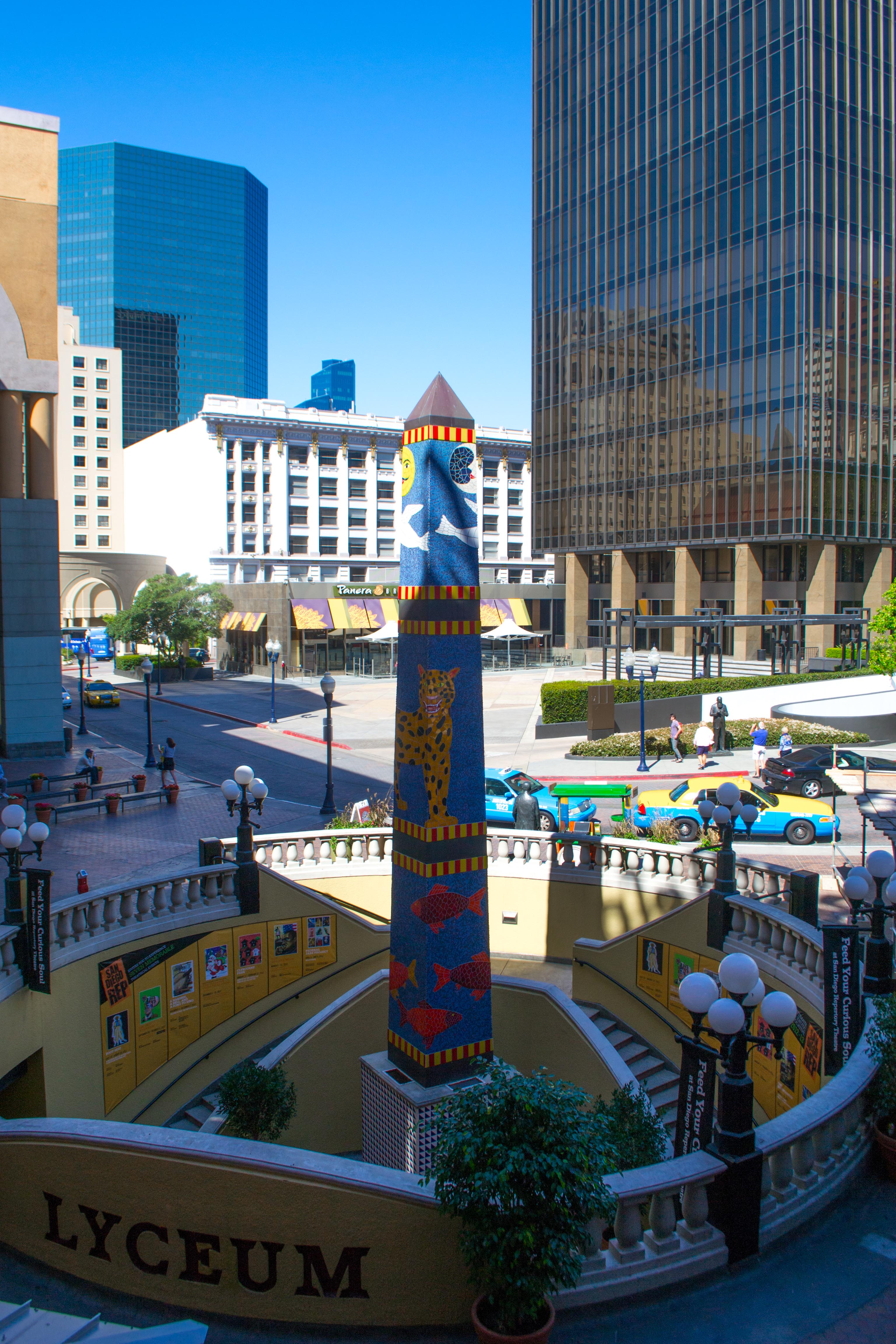
Building of Lyceum Theatre Obelisk in San Diego

The San Diego Repertory Theatre was a performing arts company in San Diego, California, United States.

== History ==
The company grew out of Indian Magique, a street theater group of actors, writers, directors, and producers, some of whom were theater graduates from United States International University. Founded initially in 1972 by Christopher R, a year later Indian Magique became San Diego's most famous street theater. Its original members included Christopher R, John William See, Hugh Monahan, Ralph Steadman, Wayne (Bernard) Baldan, Sally Brown, Frank Muir, Alan Aimes, J. Michael, Francine Lembie, and Sam Woodhouse. Whoopi Goldberg was also a founding member of the company and Annette Bening appeared in early productions. Rehearsing in the loft of the old Spreckels Building in San Diego, the troupe initially performed on the weekends in the Zoro Garden's amphitheater located in Balboa Park. These performances included their original shows Corn Dogs On Parade and the original comedia Peepee's Revenge. Both of these shows were presented at the Los Angeles Theater Festival receiving standing ovations. When the group's head writer John William See left the group in 1974, Indian Magique began relying on outside material. By 1975 they were performing See's one act play Tag for high school assemblies in the greater San Diego area, mentoring theater students at the respective high schools, and performing The Duchess of Malfi, which toured California.

In 1976, Sam Woodhouse and D. W. Jacobs established the Rep in its first home, the Sixth Avenue Playhouse. Woodhouse and Jacobs remain the company's co-directors, with Woodhouse as artistic director and Jacobs as producing director. In 1980, the company reunited two of the original Indian Magicians when presenting the world premiere of John William See's The Lady Cries Murder, directed by Christopher R. The production was voted the best play of the year by The San Diego Union-Tribune, and its popularity allowed the Rep to achieve the status as one of San Diego's premiere theaters. From that point on the San Diego Repertory would present 19 premieres and 12 West Coast premieres of plays such as American Buffalo and K2. The company's world premieres during this period included Gold! —a production that included Whoopi Goldberg, a founding member of the company.

On June 8, 2022, the company announced that it was canceling its remaining productions due to financial difficulties, and that all staff would be laid off by June 19.

== Mission ==
The company describes its mission as producing "intimate, exotic, provocative theatre." Since moving to the Lyceum it has presented 43 world premieres and 37 mainstage productions by Latino playwrights. The 1998 production of It Ain't Nothin' But the Blues was nominated for a Tony Award.

== Lyceum Theatre and Gallery ==
In the 1980s a dilapidated old theatre, the Lyceum on F Street in downtown San Diego, was scheduled to be demolished to create the Horton Plaza shopping center. The Rep obtained permission to use the 400-seat theatre as a second performance site until it was torn down. The larger venue gave the company a higher profile and a doubled budget. Also, the company's ability to draw thousands of theatergoers to a downtown site increased the pressure on the developers to include a theater in the Horton Plaza project. So a theater space was identified, completely underground below an already-built drugstore, and developed into a performing arts complex with two venues: a 550-seat mainstage theater and a flexible performance space that can accommodate up to 250 seats. The city owns the facility, which is overseen by the nonprofit Horton Plaza Theatre Foundation.

In 1986, the San Diego Repertory Theatre moved into the new Lyceum Theatre and assumed the duty of Resident Manager of the Lyceum complex, which also provides services to other arts and community organizations. The Lyceum Gallery holds art exhibitions in conjunction with the theater that usually run the length of the productions. In a single year, 350-400 performances are presented in the theaters, with an annual attendance of over 150,000 people. Of these events, two-thirds are co-productions between the Rep and more than 40 community organizations. In 2017 the theater completed a $3.9 million renovation of the facility.
