= Zoro Garden Nudist Colony =

Attraction featuring nude entertainers in California, 1935-1936

Coordinates: 32°43′52″N 117°8′52″W

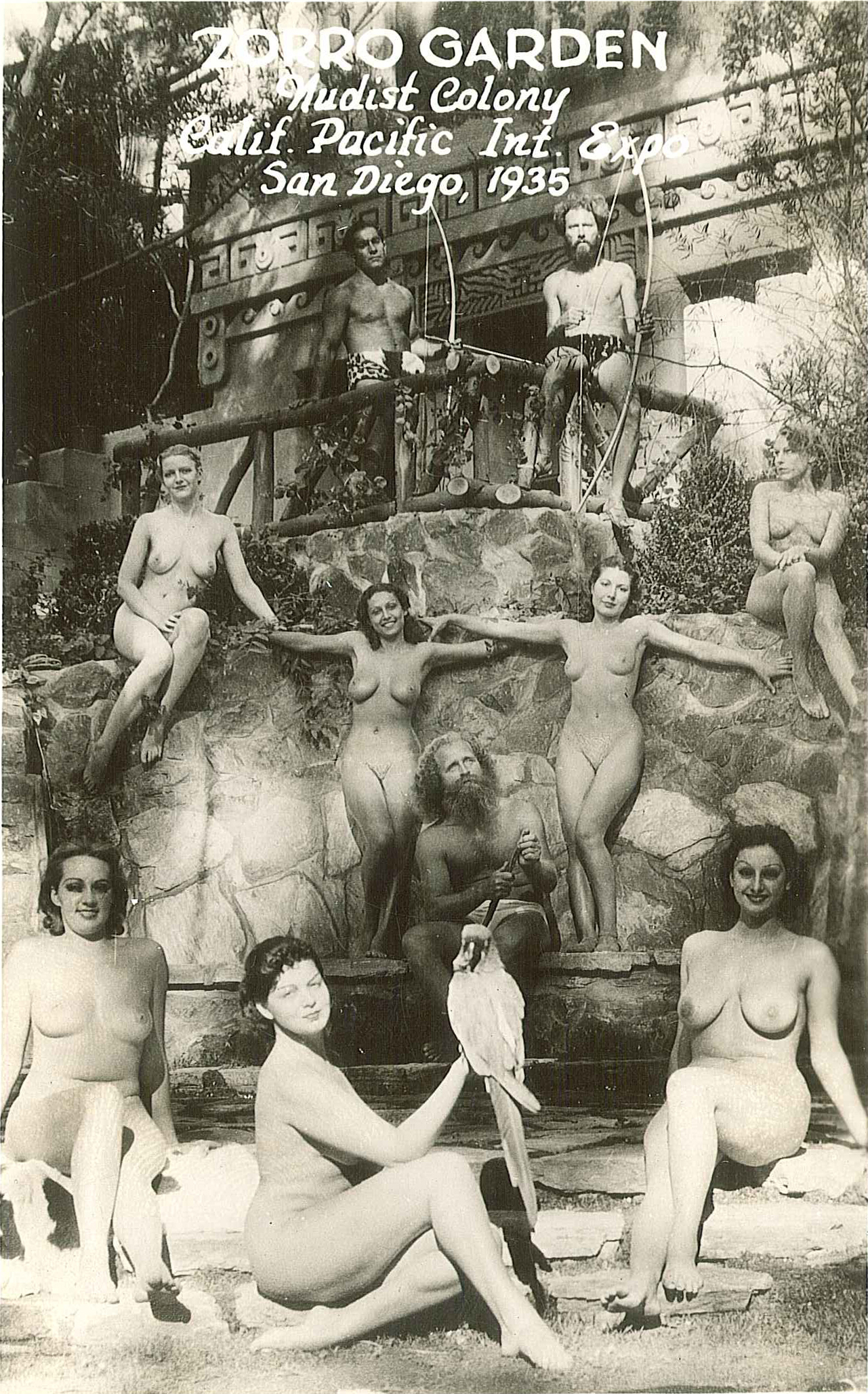
1935 postcard shows the performers posing in their "colony"

Zoro Garden Nudist Colony was an attraction at the 1935–36 California Pacific International Exposition in Balboa Park in San Diego, California. It was located in Zoro Garden, a sunken garden originally created for the 1915-16 Panama–California Exposition. Billed as a nudist colony, it was populated by hired performers rather than actual practicing nudists. The women wore only G-strings; the men wore loincloths or trunks.

The participants lounged around in their "colony", played volleyball and other games, and performed a quasi-religious "Sacrifice to the Sun God" five times a day. Fair attendees could pay for admission to bleacher-type seats, or they could peek through knotholes in a wooden fence for free. On August 27, 1936, the colony closed, allegedly "after an argument with Exposition officials about finances."

Contemporary newspaper accounts indicate the "colony" was composed of actual nudists, but local historian Matthew Alice has stated that the women were "wearing flesh-colored bras, G-strings, or body stockings so everything was zipped up tight."

Nate Eagle, a sideshow promoter who, with partner Stanley R. Graham, created the scandalous Zoro Garden nudist colony. Located in a sunken garden east of the Palace of Better Housing (today's Casa de Balboa), Zoro Garden was, according to the Zoro Garden program, "designed to explain to the general public the ideals and advantages of natural outdoor life." Topless women and bearded men in loincloths read books, sunbathed, and acted in pseudo-religious rituals to the Sun God. According to the program, "Healthy young men and women, indulging in the freedom of outdoor living in which they so devoutly believe, have opened their colony to the friendly, curious gaze of the public." The public's curious gaze quickly turned Zorro Garden into the Exposition's most lucrative outdoor attraction. Despite protests, Zorro Garden lasted for the entire run of the Exposition. The area is now the Zoro Butterfly Garden.

— Marshall, David (2008). San Diego's Balboa Park. Arcadia Publishing. ISBN 9780738569581.

== Controversy ==
Protests came from the San Diego Council of Catholic Women, the Women's Civic Center and the San Diego Braille Club. In response the city manager announced that there would be no "indecent" shows in Balboa Park during the second season of the exposition, which opened in February 1936. However, the nudist colony was still there during the second season.

The San Diego County district attorney, Thomas Whalen, inspected the colony the day before the opening of the exposition in May 1935 and approved it. Next month, "amateur nudists" demanded that Whalen investigate the showgirls as frauds, but he declined. One of the Zorro women rode through the fairgrounds at Gold Gulch on a burro and was arrested, but she was "acquitted and rode again under police supervision."
