= California Pacific International Exposition half dollar =

United States commemorative fifty-cent piece

- United States
- Value: 50 cents (0.50 US dollars)
- Mass: 12.5 g
- Diameter: 30.61 mm (1.20 in)
- Thickness: 2.15 mm (0.08 in)
- Edge: Reeded
- Composition: 90.0% silver; 10.0% copper
- Silver: 0.36169 troy oz
- Years of minting: 1935–1936
- Mintage: 1935-S: 250,132 including 132 pieces for the Assay Commission, 180,000 melted 1936-D: 180,092 including 92 assay coins, 150,000 melted
- Mint marks: S (all 1935 coins), D (all 1936 coins). Beneath the letter T beginning TRUST on the reverse

Obverse
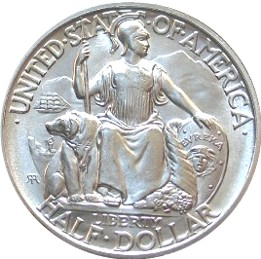
- Design: Minerva and other elements of the Seal of California
- Designer: Robert Ingersoll Aitken
- Design date: 1935

Reverse
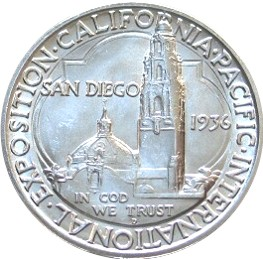
- Design: California Tower and Chapel of St. Francis, Balboa Park, San Diego
- Designer: Robert Ingersoll Aitken
- Design date: 1935

The California Pacific International Exposition half dollar, sometimes called the California Pacific half dollar or the San Diego half dollar, is a commemorative fifty-cent piece struck by the United States Bureau of the Mint in 1935 and 1936. Robert Ingersoll Aitken designed the coin. Its obverse depicts Minerva and other elements of the Seal of California; the reverse shows buildings from the California Pacific International Exposition (held 1935–1936), which the coin was issued to honor.

Legislation for the half dollar moved through Congress without opposition in early 1935, and Aitken was hired to design it. Once his creation was approved, the San Francisco Mint produced 250,000 coins, but expected sales did not materialize. Left with more than 180,000 pieces they could not sell, the Exposition Commission went back to Congress for further legislation so it could return the unsold pieces and have new coins, dated 1936, hoping for greater sales in the second year of the fair's run. Although the commission was successful in getting the legislation passed, it was less so in selling the coins, and 150,000 1936-dated pieces were returned to the Mint. The coins, of either date, sell in the low hundreds of dollars today.

== Background and authorization ==
The California Pacific International Exposition was a world's fair held in San Diego's Balboa Park in 1935 and 1936. One of the largest expositions of its kind, it was held on 1,400 acres (570 ha) of land, and cost $20 million. The fair attracted some 3.75 million visitors during its two-year run.

At that time, commemorative coins were not sold by the government—Congress, in authorizing legislation, usually designated an organization which had the exclusive right to purchase them at face value and sell them to the public at a premium. In the case of the California Pacific Exposition half dollar, it was the California Pacific International Exposition Co.

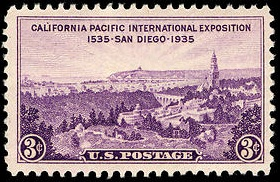
Three-cent stamp issued by the United States Post Office Department for the Exposition, 1935

California's George Burnham introduced a bill for a California Pacific Exposition half dollar into the House of Representatives on February 19, 1935. It was referred to the Committee on Coinage, Weights, and Measures. John J. Cochran of Missouri, acting chairman of that committee, reported back to the House on April 12 with the recommendation that it pass after small technical amendments were made. The bill called for the issuance of a maximum of 250,000 half dollars. Cochran noted that Congressman Burnham had appeared before the committee, representing that there would be no expense to the government, and sent a letter so stating (reproduced in the report). Burnham had also written that the Exposition had considerable participation by the federal government, and its officials expected seven to ten million people to attend. The following day, Cochran had the bill considered by the House, which passed the recommended amendment and then the bill itself without any debate.

The Senate received the bill on April 15, and referred it to the Banking and Currency Committee. On April 23, the committee, through its chairman, Duncan U. Fletcher of Florida, recommended that the bill pass, with a report similar to that of the House. On April 26, the bill passed the Senate on Fletcher's motion without any discussion or dissent. President Franklin D. Roosevelt signed it on May 3, 1935.

== Preparation and design ==
California Senator William G. McAdoo, former Secretary of the Treasury under Woodrow Wilson, wrote to the incumbent Treasury Secretary, Henry Morgenthau, proposing that the late president appear on the half dollar; Morgenthau wrote back calling the idea "interesting" and suggested it be directed to the Exposition Commission, which was responsible for securing designs. The January 1935 issue of The Numismatist (the journal of the American Numismatic Association), which went to press before the congressional actions, reported that there were plans for 50,000 silver dollar and 150,000 half dollar coins depicting President Roosevelt.

State Seal of California

Sculptor Robert Aitken, creator of other commemorative coins including the $50 Panama-Pacific issue, was hired to design the California Pacific half dollar. He submitted plaster models to the Commission of Fine Arts, charged by a 1921 executive order by President Warren G. Harding with making recommendations regarding public artworks, including coins. Commission sculptor-member Lee Lawrie took the lead in examining the models, and they were approved on July 5, 1935, though Lawrie questioned the legality of having coins omitting the mottoes LIBERTY and E PLURIBUS UNUM. Aitken subsequently added LIBERTY to the obverse. After final approval, the models were shipped to the Medallic Art Company of New York for reduction to coin-sized hubs, which were then sent to the Philadelphia Mint, where the working dies were made. These dies were in turn shipped to the San Francisco Mint.

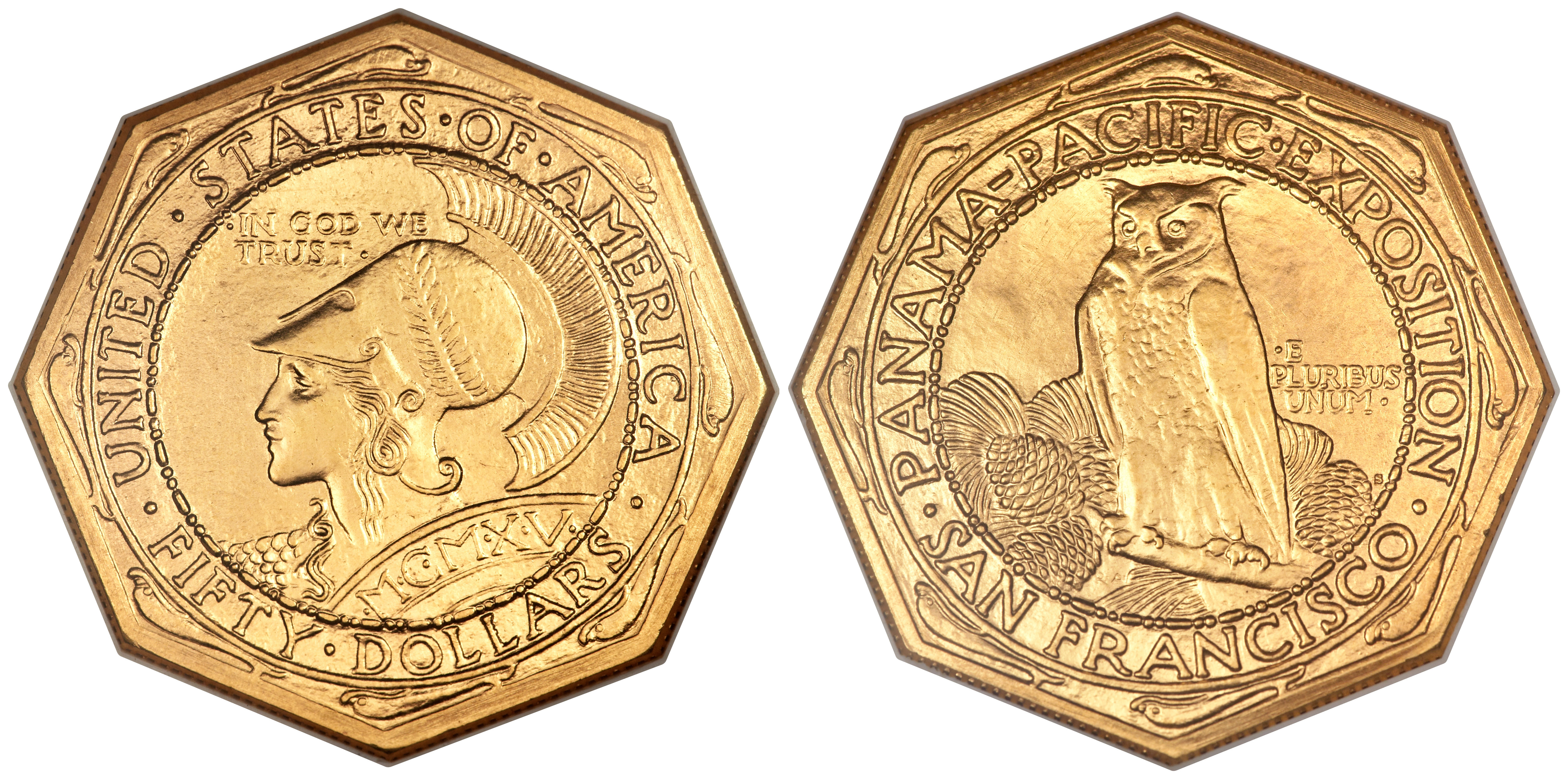
Aitken's octagonal $50 piece, part of the 1915 Panama-Pacific commemorative coin issue, also depicts Minerva.

Aitken's obverse shows elements of the California State Seal with a seated depiction of Minerva. She wears a helmet and holds a staff with her right hand, her left rests on a shield with EUREKA on it. On the shield is an aegis, with the head of Medusa affixed; between goddess and shield is a cornucopia overflowing with produce, symbolic of California's vast resources. A grizzly bear is to the left of Minerva. Behind them, in the distance, is a sailing ship and gold miner, with the hills of the Sierra Madre as background. The name of the issuing country and the denomination surround the central design, with LIBERTY under Minerva. The reverse shows two buildings constructed for the Exposition, and part of the California State Buildings at the fair, the California Tower and Chapel of St. Francis (today the Museum of Us). The outline which surrounds the buildings is said to suggest Spanish Mission architecture but Anthony Swiatek and Walter Breen, in their book on commemorative coins, identify it as a tressure, found on some medieval gold coins. The name of the exposition surrounds the design, with the date, IN GOD WE TRUST (under which the mint mark is found) and SAN DIEGO among the buildings.

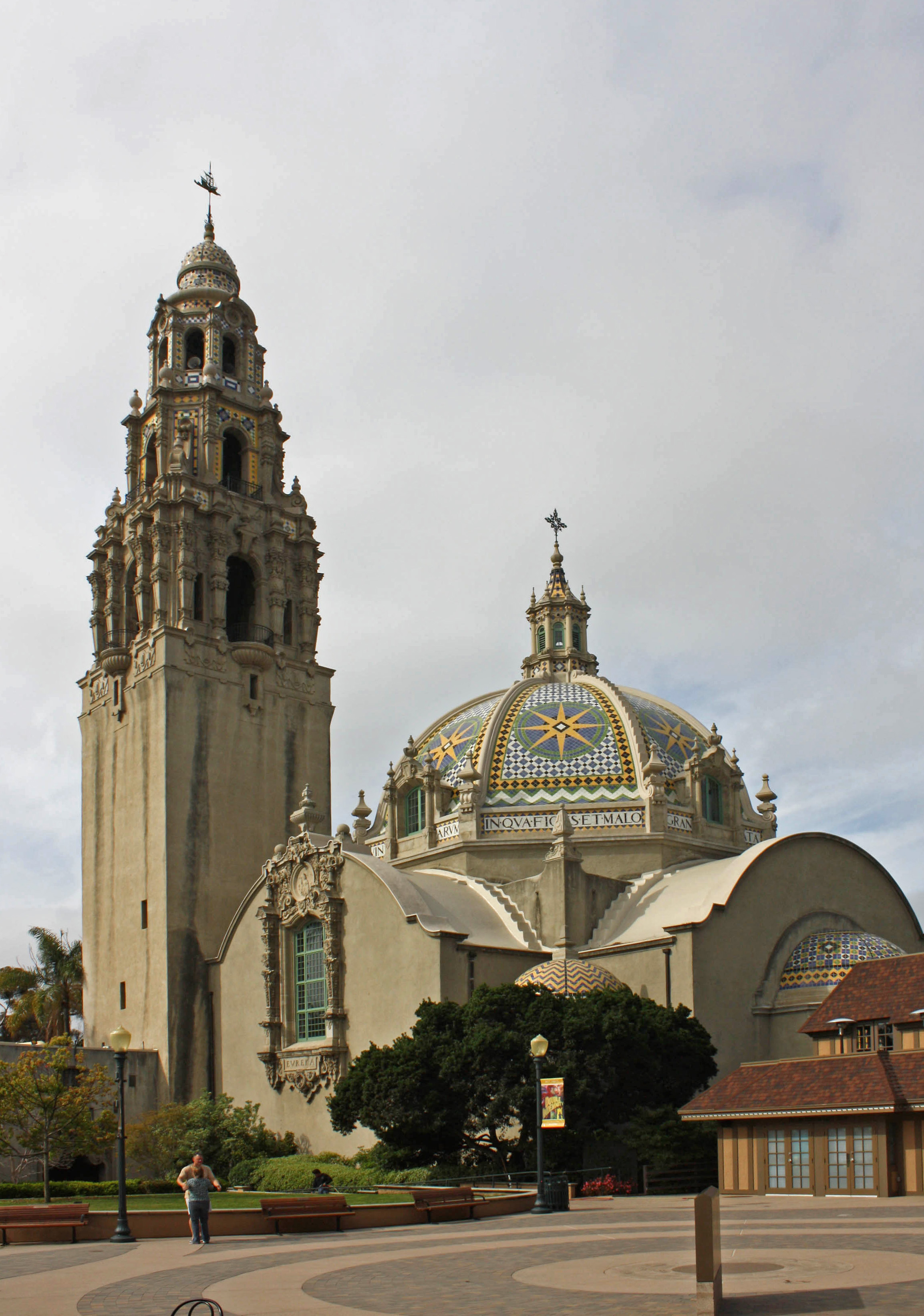
The California Tower and Chapel of St. Francis, Balboa Park, San Diego

Numismatic author Don Taxay called the half dollar "a very distinguished coin artistically", and said of its reverse, "I cannot think of another architectural motif that has been treated so successfully on a United States coin." Art historian Cornelius Vermeule liked the California Pacific half dollar, deeming the Minerva "one of the most powerful uses of the facing figure in American numismatic art". He deemed Aitken's design influenced by the pediments and other works he had sculpted during the 1920s and 1930s, including the pediment for the United States Supreme Court Building. He felt the depiction of the buildings on the reverse was "good enough for what it pretends to show", and noted that the monogrammatic style of the artist's initials was imitated by Gilroy Roberts when signing his obverse of the Kennedy half dollar (1964). Vermeule noted that the lettering "confirms the strength and balance of the total visual experience".

== Production, distribution, and collecting ==
250,132 coins were minted in San Francisco in August 1935. 132 were sent to Philadelphia and held for inspection and testing at the 1936 meeting of the Assay Commission. The 250,000 remaining coins were sent from San Francisco to the Bank of America branch in San Diego, which handled distribution, and placed on sale at the fair on August 12 at $1 each. Despite considerable publicity, only 68,000 sold, with 2,000 more being held by the Exposition authorities.

Although commemorative coin collecting (and investing) was becoming popular in 1935, the mintage of a quarter million coins, far in excess of some other issues of the era, meant investors were indifferent to the California Pacific issue. With sales of the 1935-S (Note: Dated 1935 with mint mark S for the San Francisco Mint, thus 1935-S.) half dollar coming to a standstill, the Exposition Commission was well aware of this problem. Thus, they sought relief from Congress in the form of an act allowing them to return unsold half dollars for new ones, dated 1936. Coin collectors would view this as a new variety and possibly buy both, and melting the returned coins would decrease the supply and (hopefully) increase the attractiveness of the remaining 1935-S specimens.

At about this time [late 1935], commemorative coin collectors throughout the nation became coinage-figure conscious. Coinage figures for a while determined retail values. Large authorizations meant a tremendous floating supply of coins, which would have little value to the commemorative coin collector or to his new companion, the commemorative coin speculator.

— David M. Bullowa, The Commemorative Coinage of the United States 1892–1938 (1938), p. 124.

Accordingly, on January 6, 1936, Congressman Burnham introduced legislation to accomplish this. On February 17, the committee reported back through New York's Andrew Somers, noting that the bill provided that the exchange would take place without expense to the United States, and recommending that it pass. When Burnham brought the matter to the House floor on March 16, Michigan's Jesse Wolcott asked how the exchange would be done without expense to the government, and Burnham affirmed that the Exposition Commission would meet all expenses. He explained that the coins had been received so late in the year there had not been time to sell many. There were no further questions, and the bill passed the House without objection.

The Senate committee reported on April 17, adding provisions requiring that the coins be dated 1936, regardless of when struck, and that they be produced at only one mint, chosen by the Director of the Mint, in line with other commemorative coin bills that committee had been reporting. Early numismatic author David M. Bullowa noted these provisions, designed to prevent the creation of varieties, were thus inserted in a bill that itself created a new variety. The Senate considered the bill on April 24, and it was amended and passed without debate or opposition. As the two versions passed were not identical, the bill returned to the House of Representatives where, on April 27, that body at Burnham's motion, without debate or opposition, agreed to the Senate amendments. President Roosevelt signed the bill on May 6.

G. Aubrey Davidson, chairman of the Exposition Commission, wrote to Acting Director of the Mint Mary M. O'Reilly on May 16, 1936, asking that the coins (which were to be struck at the Denver Mint and bear its mint mark "D") be minted as quickly as possible, as heavy attendance was expected at the fair around Memorial Day at the end of May. The production at the Denver Mint made the California Pacific half dollar the first commemorative to be struck at San Francisco and at Denver, but not at Philadelphia. It is the only pre-1954 commemorative with that distinction. A total of 180,092 of the 1936-D were produced, representing the number returned (the maximum allowed) plus 92 assay coins. The new coins were placed on sale at $1.50 each.

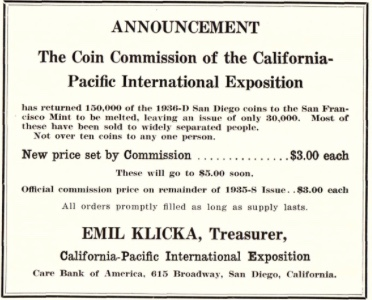
Advertisement for the half dollars, 1937

There was a spike in prices for many commemorative coins in 1936, but due to the relatively high mintages of both the 1935-S and the 1936-D, the California Pacific coins sold badly, and when the Exposition closed in late 1936, fewer than 30,000 of the 1936-D had been sold. On January 27, 1937, Davidson wrote to the Director of the Mint, Nellie Tayloe Ross, asking her to allow the return of some 150,000 coins for refund, the glut blamed on having a relatively short period to sell them. Once the Mint had granted permission, the Exposition Commission placed the 1935-S and 1936-D pieces it withheld from the melting pot on sale at $3 each. Swiatek, in his 2012 volume on commemoratives, said the price increase was "to create the appearance of demand and future rarity. This didn't work."

In 1938, Emil Klicka, treasurer of the Exposition, offered the 1936-D for sale at $1 each, with a limit of ten. The 1935-S coins were available at $2. Large hoards of both dates were held by insiders for decades, including one holding of 31,050 of the 1935-S, amounting to nearly half the extant mintage. These were gradually dispersed from the 1960s to the 1980s. In 1962, the 1935-S was worth $9 in uncirculated condition, and the 1936-D was worth $11. The edition of the Red Book (A Guide Book of United States Coins) published in 2018 lists the 1935-S for between $100 and $160, depending on condition, with the 1936-D from between $100 and $225. A near-pristine 1935-S sold at auction in 2014 for $4,994.

== Sources ==
- Bowers, Q. David (1992). Commemorative Coins of the United States: A Complete Encyclopedia. Wolfeboro, New Hampshire: Bowers and Merena Galleries, Inc. ISBN 978-0-943161-35-8.
- Bullowa, David M. (1938). "The Commemorative Coinage of the United States 1892–1938". Numismatic Notes and Monographs (83). New York: American Numismatic Society: i–192. JSTOR 43607181.
- Flynn, Kevin (2008). The Authoritative Reference on Commemorative Coins 1892–1954. Roswell, Georgia: Kyle Vick. OCLC 711779330.
- Slabaugh, Arlie R. (1975). United States Commemorative Coinage (2nd ed.). Racine, Wisconsin: Whitman Publishing. ISBN 978-0-307-09377-6.
- Swiatek, Anthony (2012). Encyclopedia of the Commemorative Coins of the United States. Chicago: KWS Publishers. ISBN 978-0-9817736-7-4.
- Swiatek, Anthony; Breen, Walter (1981). The Encyclopedia of United States Silver & Gold Commemorative Coins, 1892 to 1954. New York: Arco Publishing. ISBN 978-0-668-04765-4.
- Taxay, Don (1967). An Illustrated History of U.S. Commemorative Coinage. New York: Arco Publishing. ISBN 978-0-668-01536-3.
- United States House of Representatives Committee on Coinage, Weights and Measures (April 12, 1935). Coinage of 50-cent pieces in connection with the California Pacific International Exposition to be held in San Diego, Calif., in 1935 and 1936. Washington, D.C.: United States Government Printing Office.
- United States House of Representatives Committee on Coinage, Weights and Measures (February 17, 1936). To authorize the recoinage of 50-cent pieces in connection with the California-Pacific International Exposition to be held in San Diego, Calif., in 1936. Washington, D.C.: United States Government Printing Office.
- United States Senate Committee on Banking and Currency (April 15, 1935). Coinage of 50-cent pieces in connection with the California Pacific International Exposition to be held in San Diego, Calif., in 1935 and 1936. Washington, D.C.: United States Government Printing Office.
- United States Senate Committee on Banking and Currency (April 17, 1936). Authorize recoinage of 50-cent pieces in connection with California-Pacific International Exposition, San Diego, Calif., 1936. Washington, D.C.: United States Government Printing Office.
- Vermeule, Cornelius (1971). Numismatic Art in America. Cambridge, Massachusetts: The Belknap Press of Harvard University Press. ISBN 978-0-674-62840-3.
- Yeoman, R.S. (2015). A Guide Book of United States Coins (1st Mega ed.). Atlanta, Georgia: Whitman Publishing, LLC. ISBN 978-0-7948-4307-6.
- Yeoman, R.S. (2018). A Guide Book of United States Coins (4th Mega ed.). Atlanta, Georgia: Whitman Publishing, LLC. ISBN 978-0-7948-4580-3.
