= San Diego Automotive Museum =

Automotive museum in San Diego, California

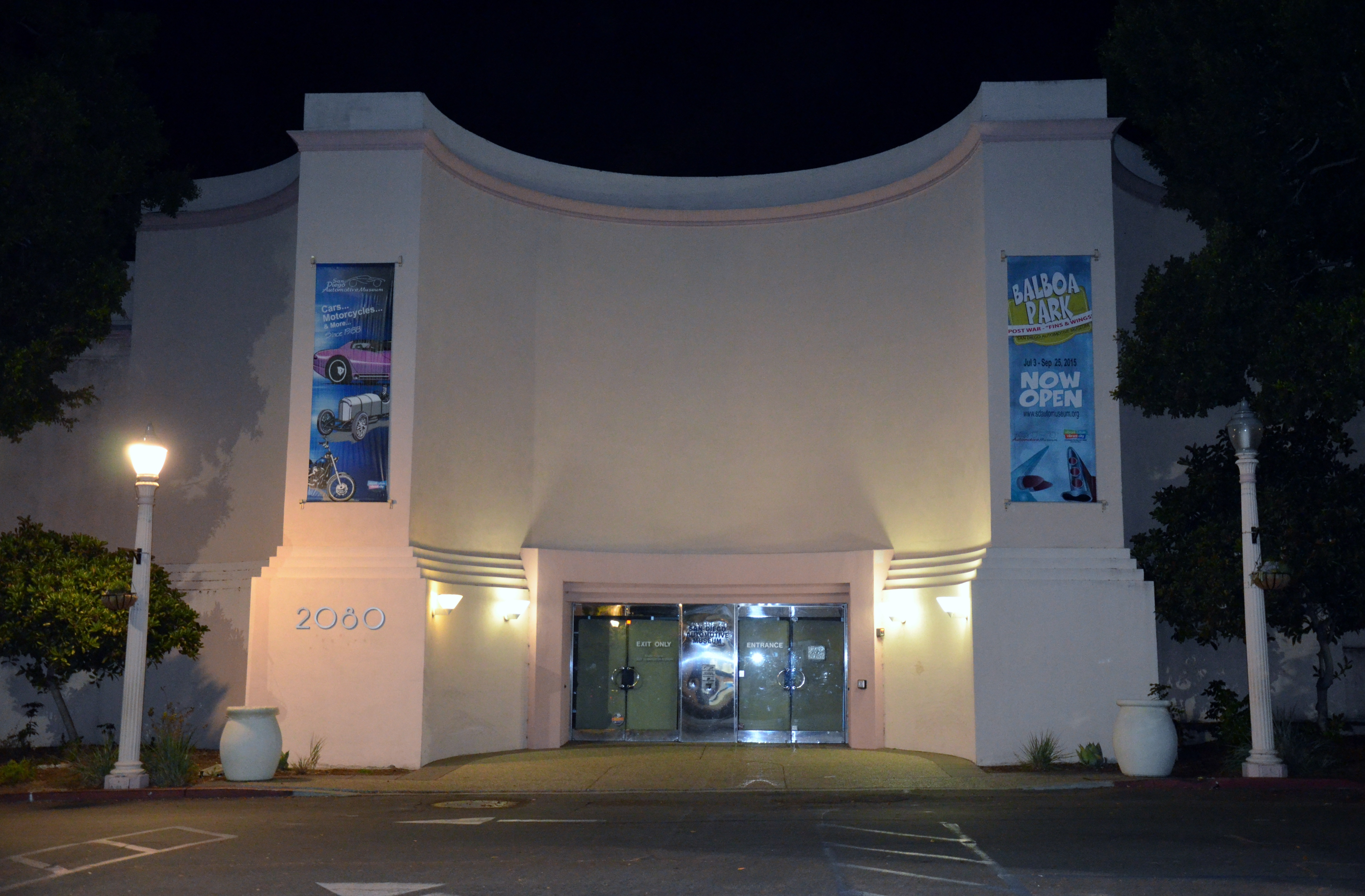

- Location within San Diego Location within California Location within the United States
- Established: 1988; 38 years ago
- Location: San Diego, California, United States
- Coordinates: 32°43′38.94″N 117°09′12.98″W
- CEO: Lenny Leszczynski
- Website: sdautomuseum.org

The San Diego Automotive Museum is a museum in Balboa Park in San Diego, California. It contains a collection of cars and motorcycles illustrating the history of American automotive culture.

== Organization ==
The San Diego Automotive Museum is a non-profit corporation under IRS section 501(c) It is housed in the former California State Building, which was constructed for the 1935–36 California Pacific International Exposition.

== Collection ==
One of the collection's signature cars is Louie Mattar's Fabulous Car, a 1947 Cadillac-with-trailer that was driven non-stop from Alaska to Mexico City and across the United States. Its owner extensively modified it to become largely self-contained, and its cross-country trips incorporated in-motion refueling from support vehicles.

Exhibits are rotated every four to six months.

The museum displays vintage cars and has an impressive collection of automobiles and their history. In 2024 the museum celebrated its 35th anniversary. Each anniversary it has special exhibitions that focus on different aspects of automotive history, including classic cars and racing.

== Gallery ==
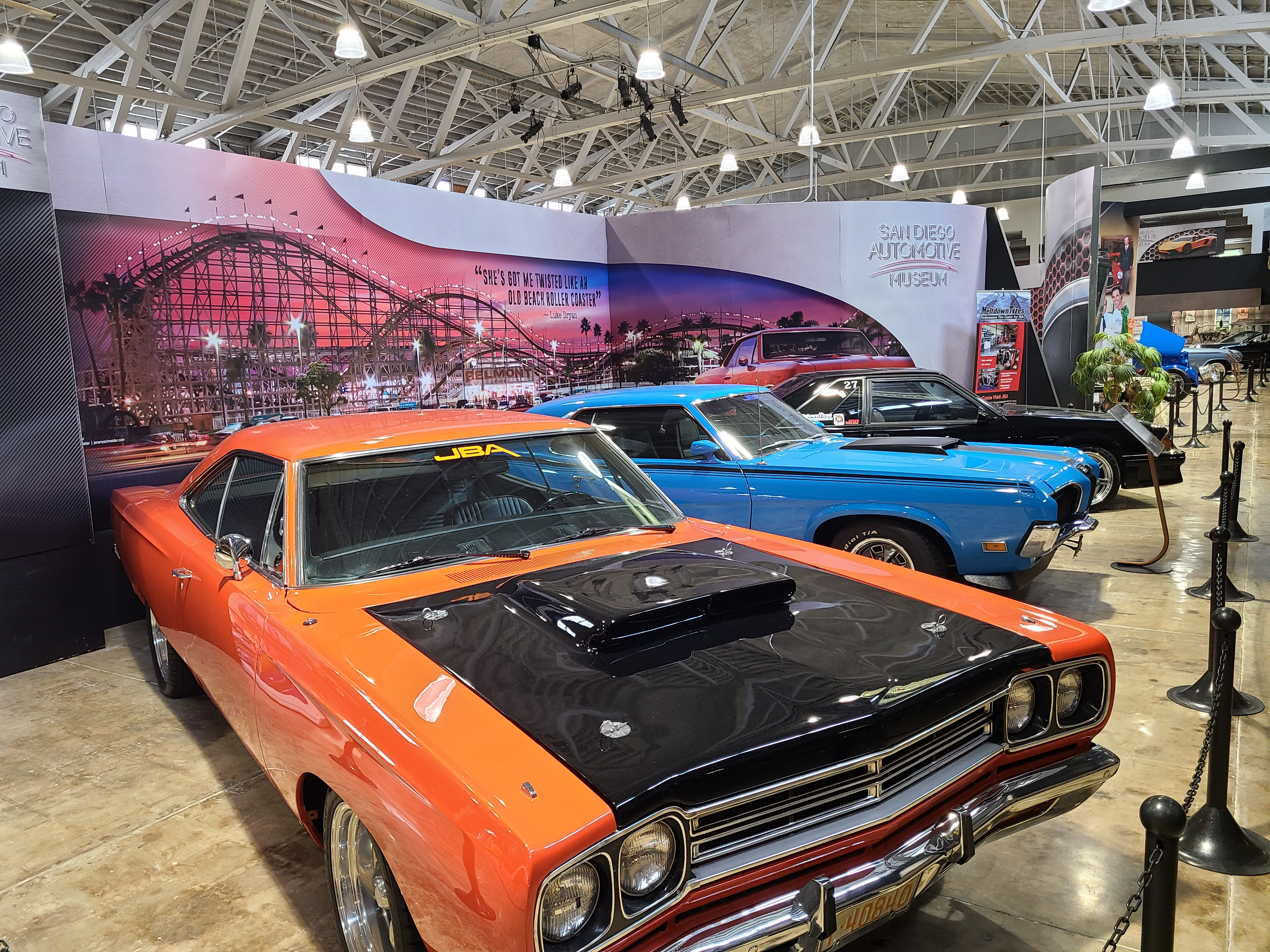

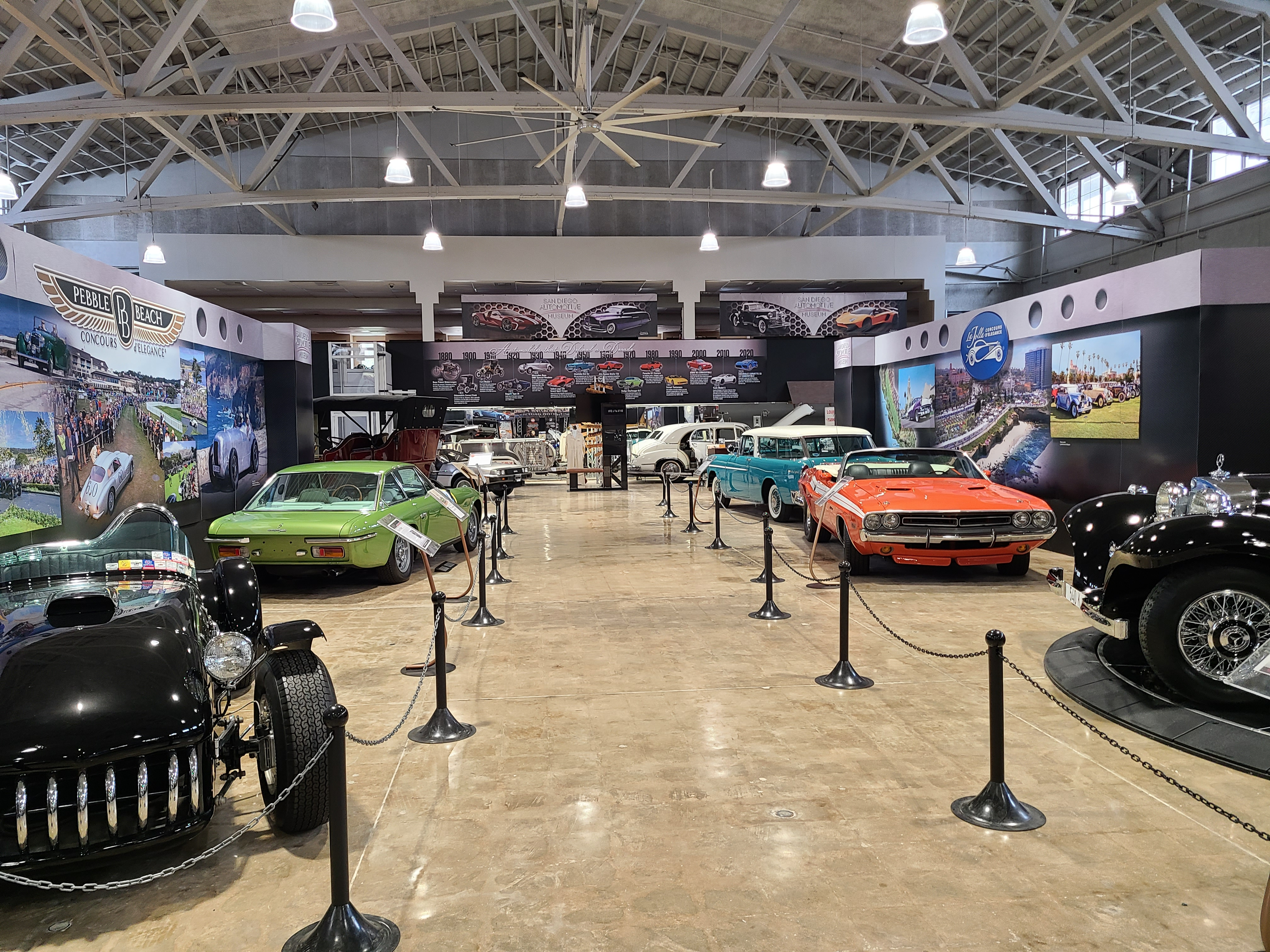

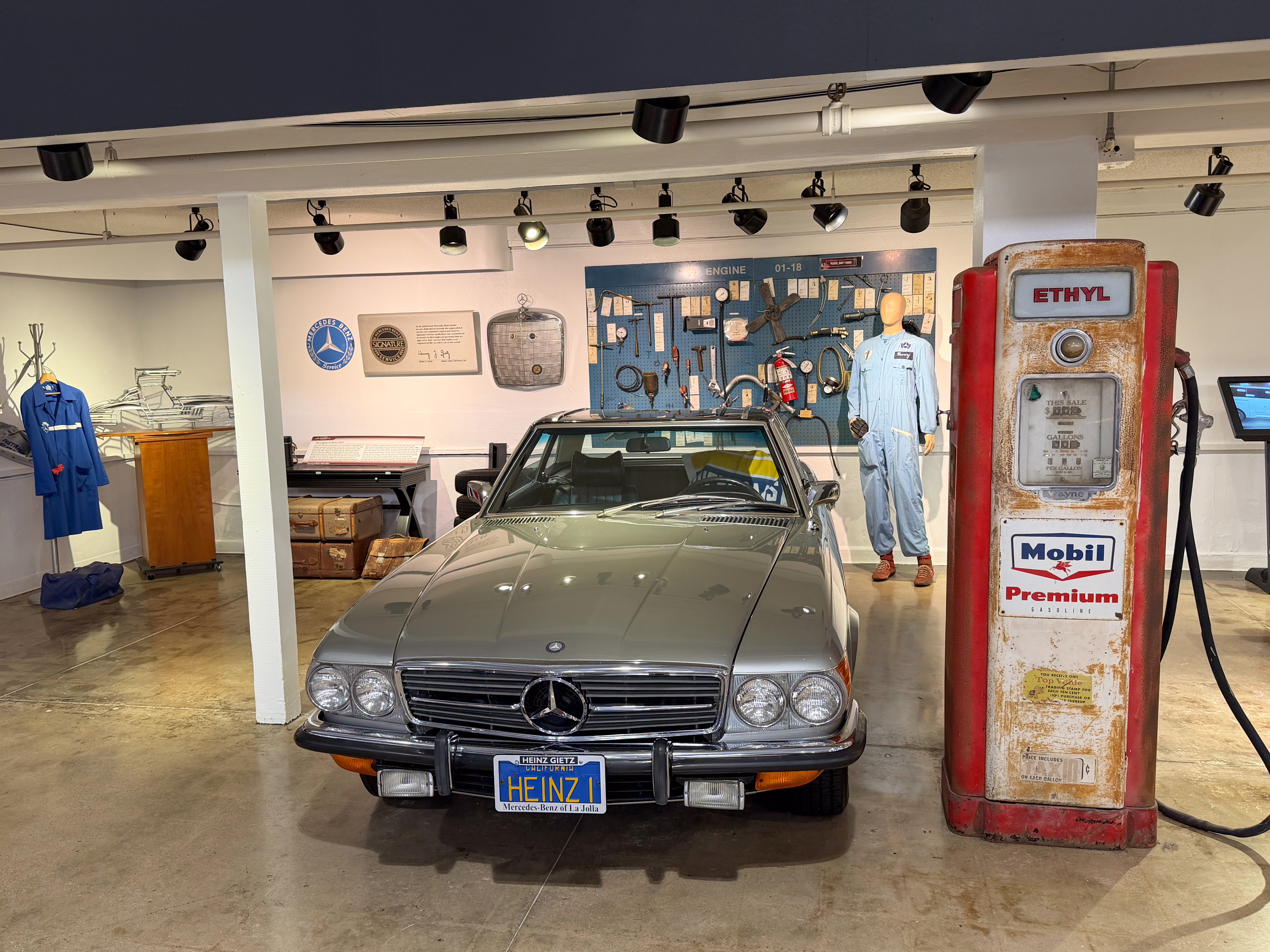

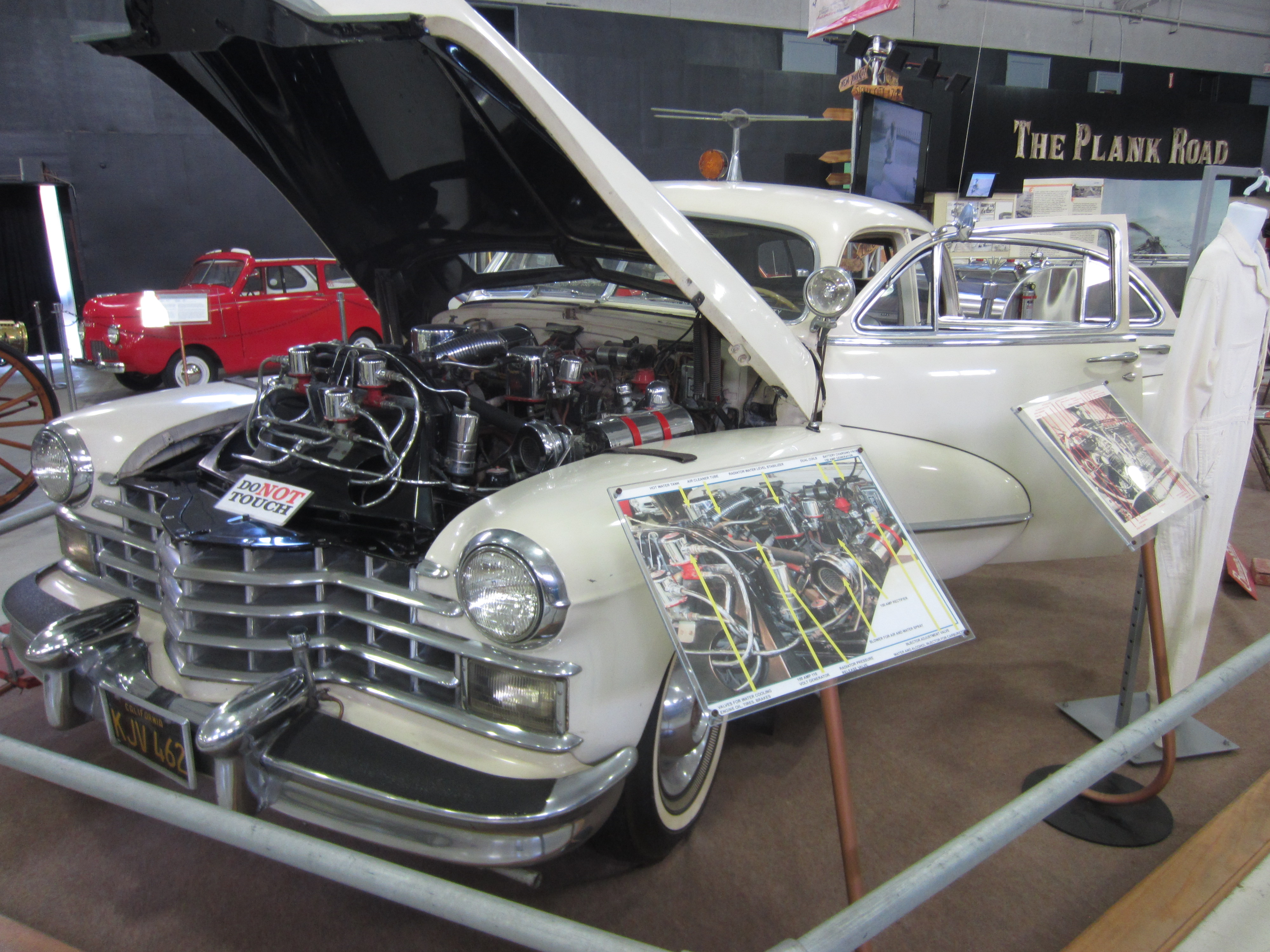

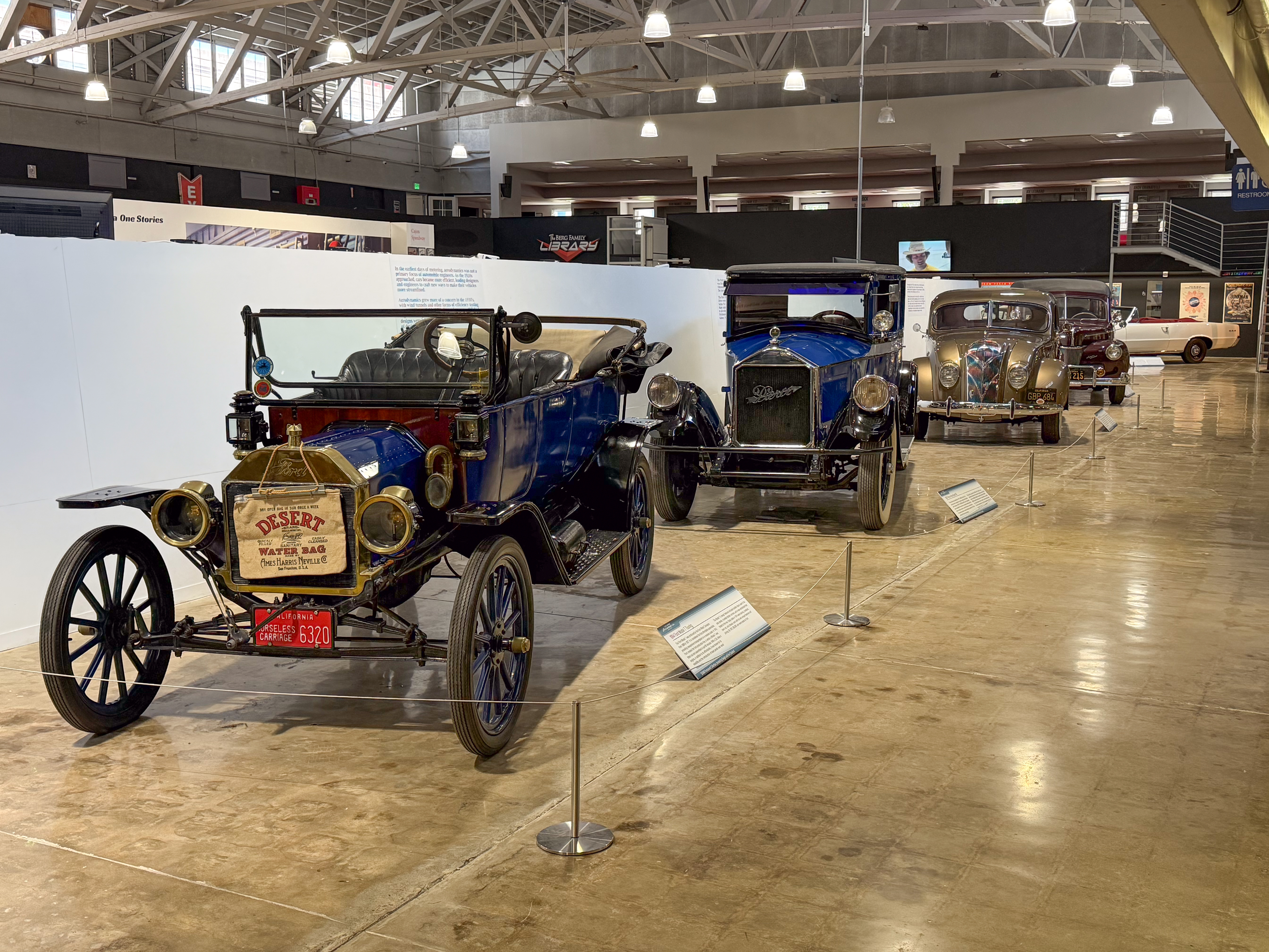

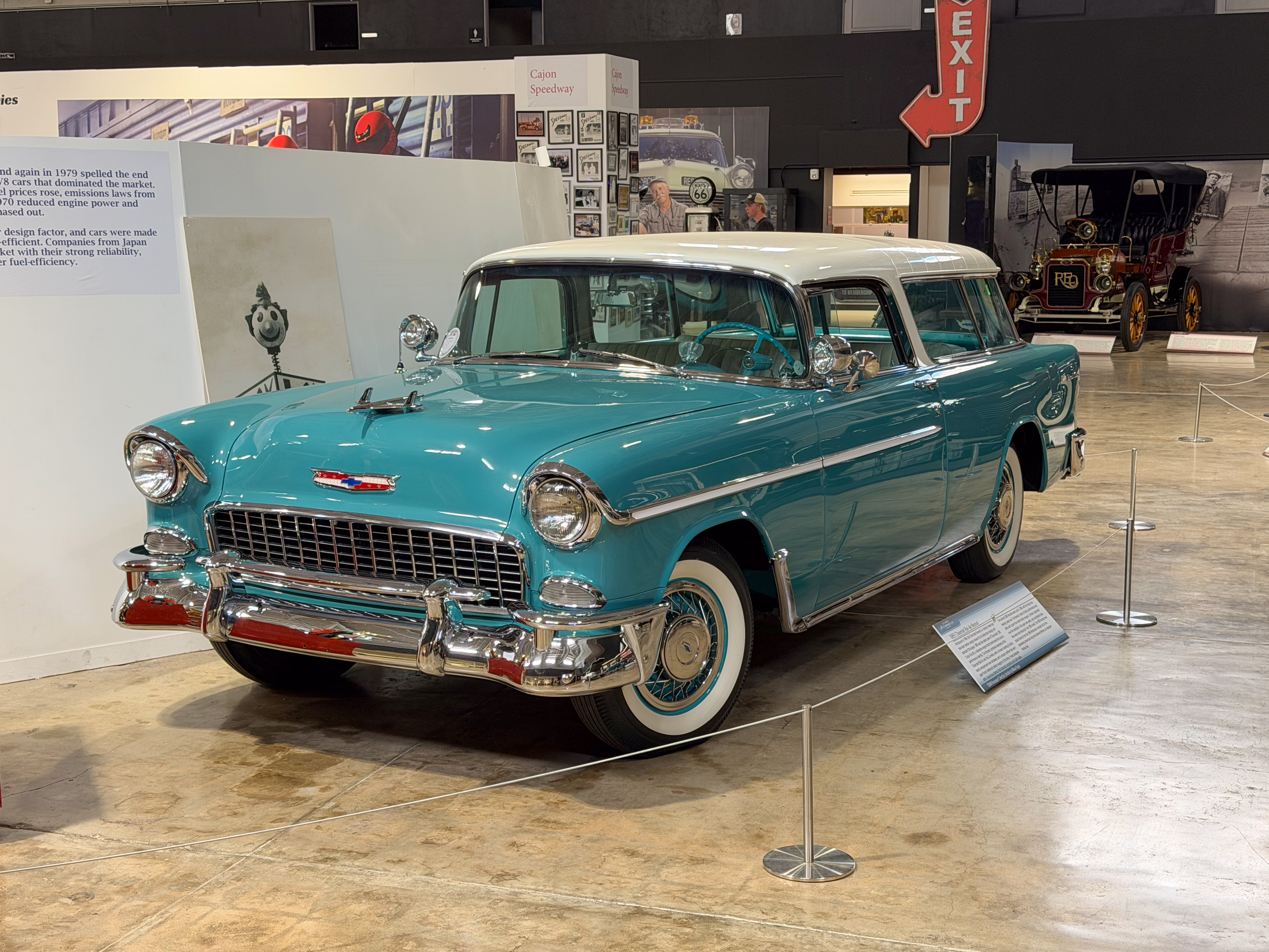

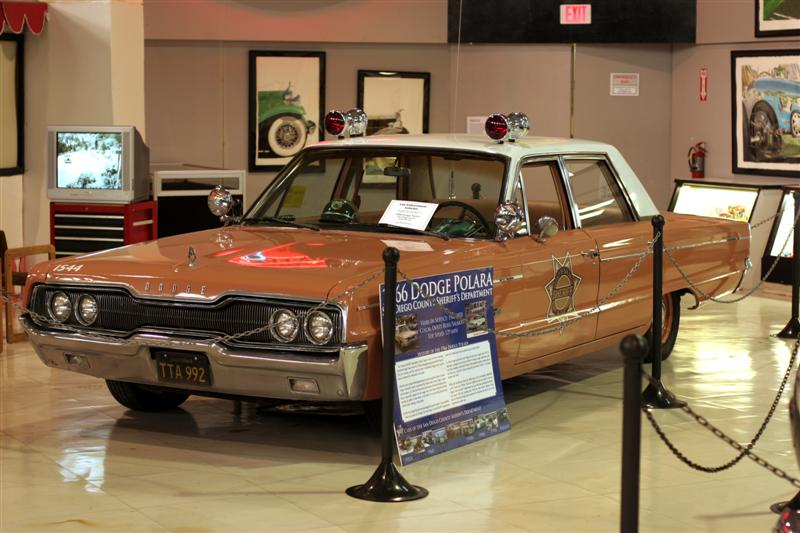

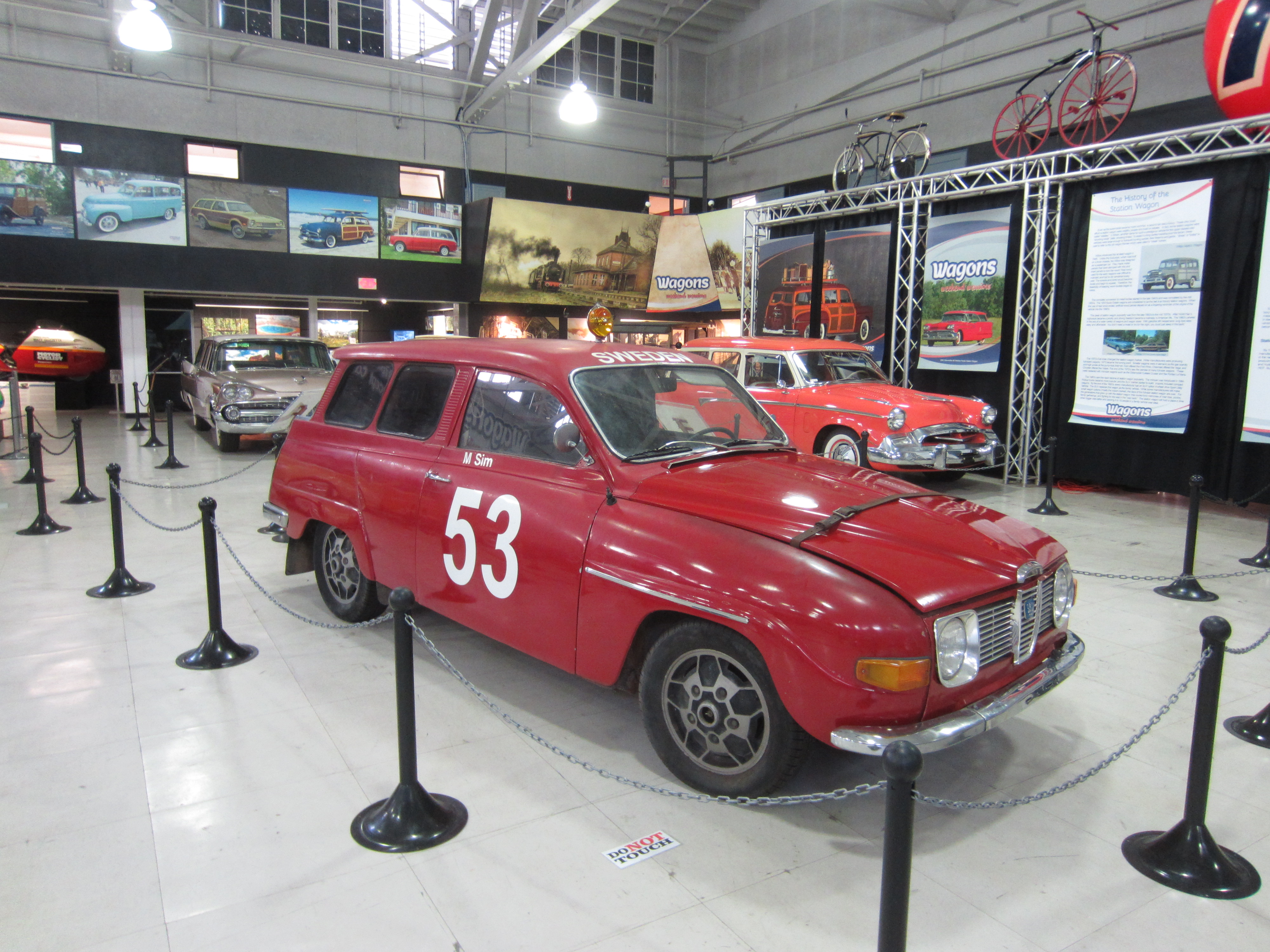

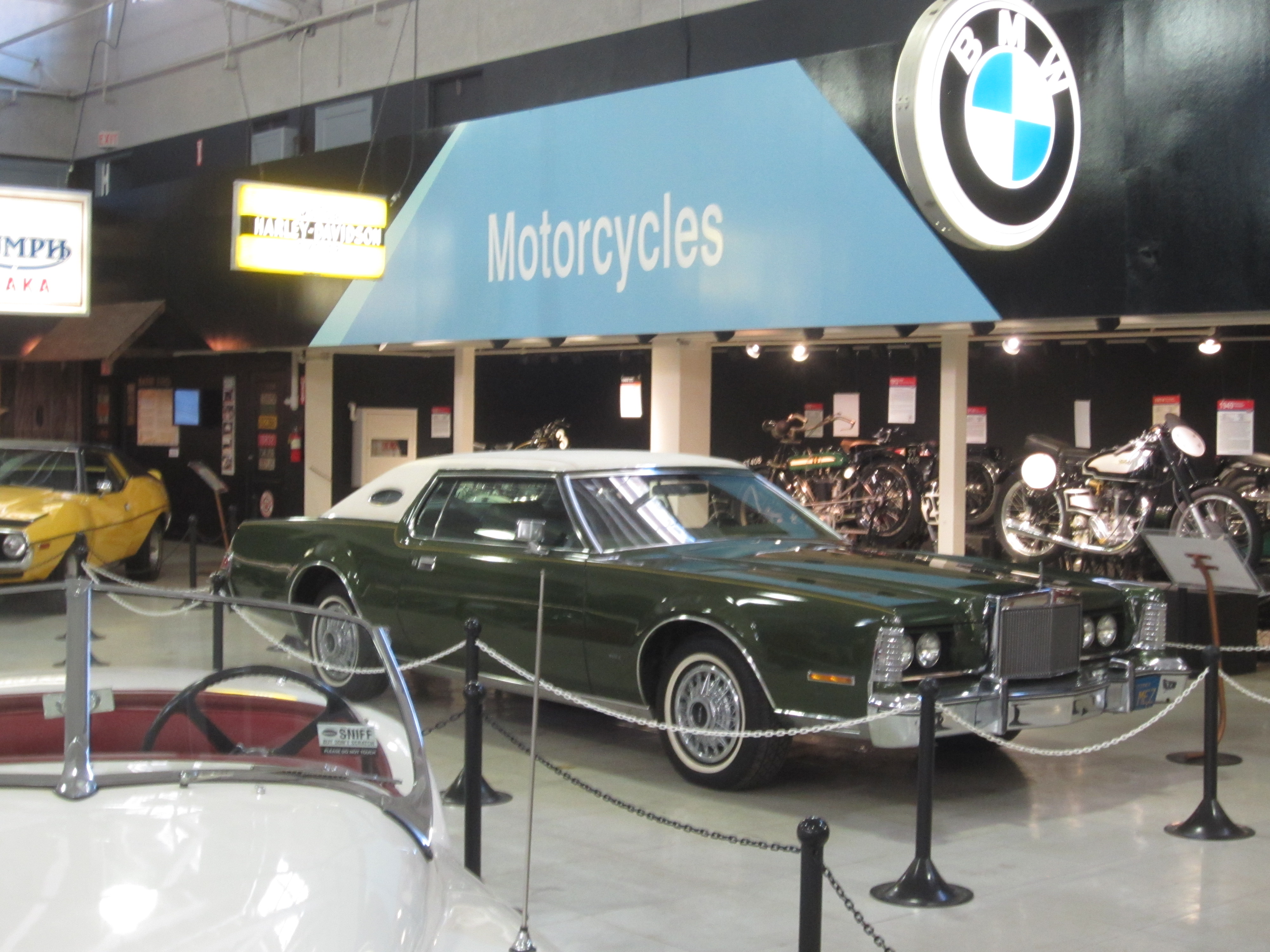
