= Zoro Garden =

Garden in San Diego, California, United States

Coordinates: 32°43′51.91″N 117°8′52.13″W

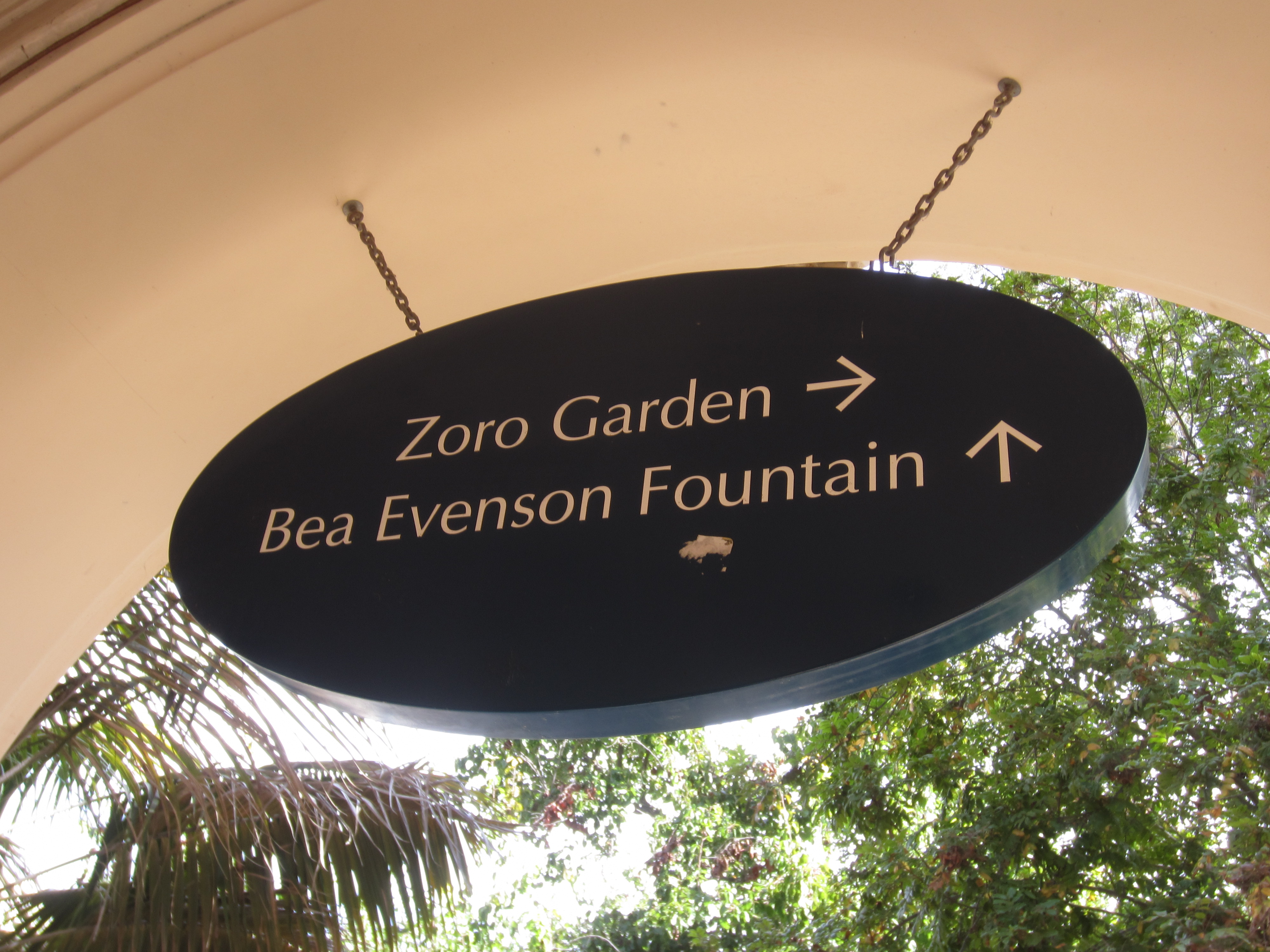

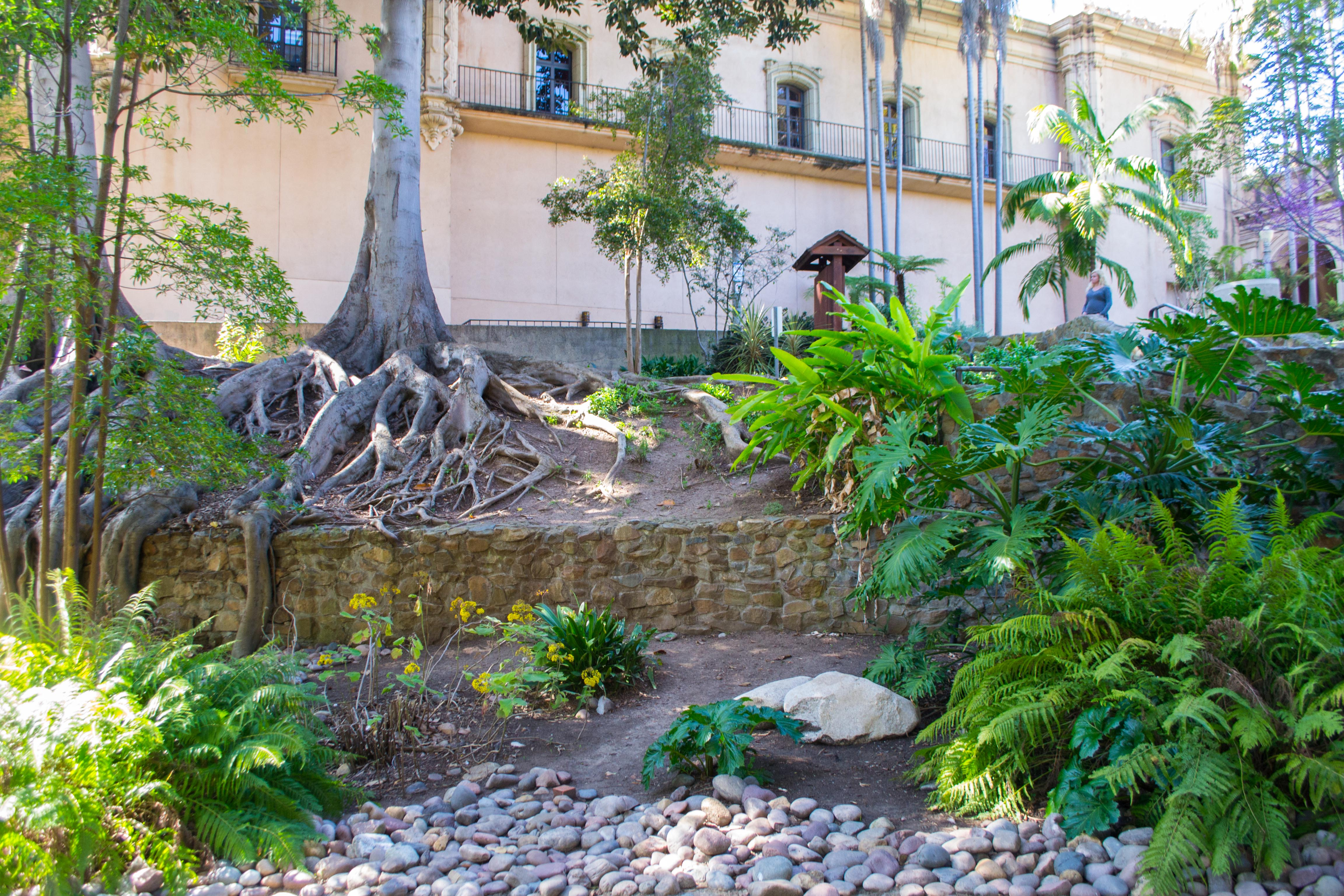
- Interactive map of Zoro Garden
- Type: Butterfly garden
- Location: Balboa Park, San Diego, California, United States
- Area: 6 acres (2.4 ha)
- Created: 1915
- Designer: Built for the Panama–California Exposition (1915–16)
- Open: Yes
- Status: Open year-round
- Facilities: Former site of the Zoro Garden Nudist Colony (1935–36)

Zoro Garden is a six-acre sunken garden in Balboa Park in San Diego, California. It is located between the Fleet Science Center and Casa de Balboa. The name refers to the Persian mystic Zoroaster.

The stone garden was originally built for the 1915–16 Panama–California Exposition. During the 1935–36 California Pacific International Exposition it was the site of Zoro Garden Nudist Colony, which featured mostly-nude performers rather than practicing nudists.

Zoro Garden is now planted as a butterfly garden. It is open to the public and can be reserved for special events.

== Image Gallery ==
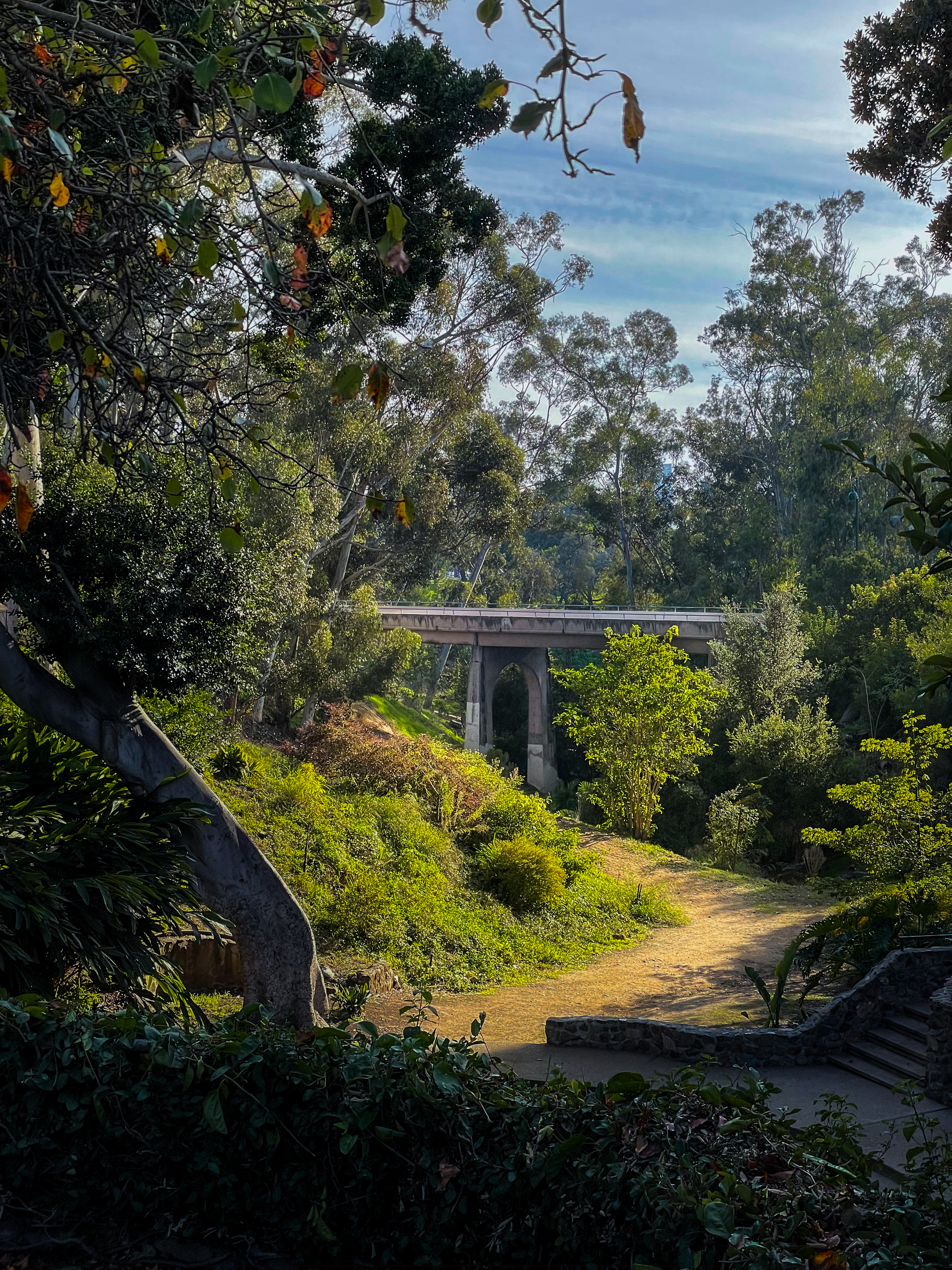
South-facing view from above Zoro Garden and towards the bridge of Space Theater Way.
