= California Pacific International Exposition =

1935 and 1936 exposition in San Diego, California

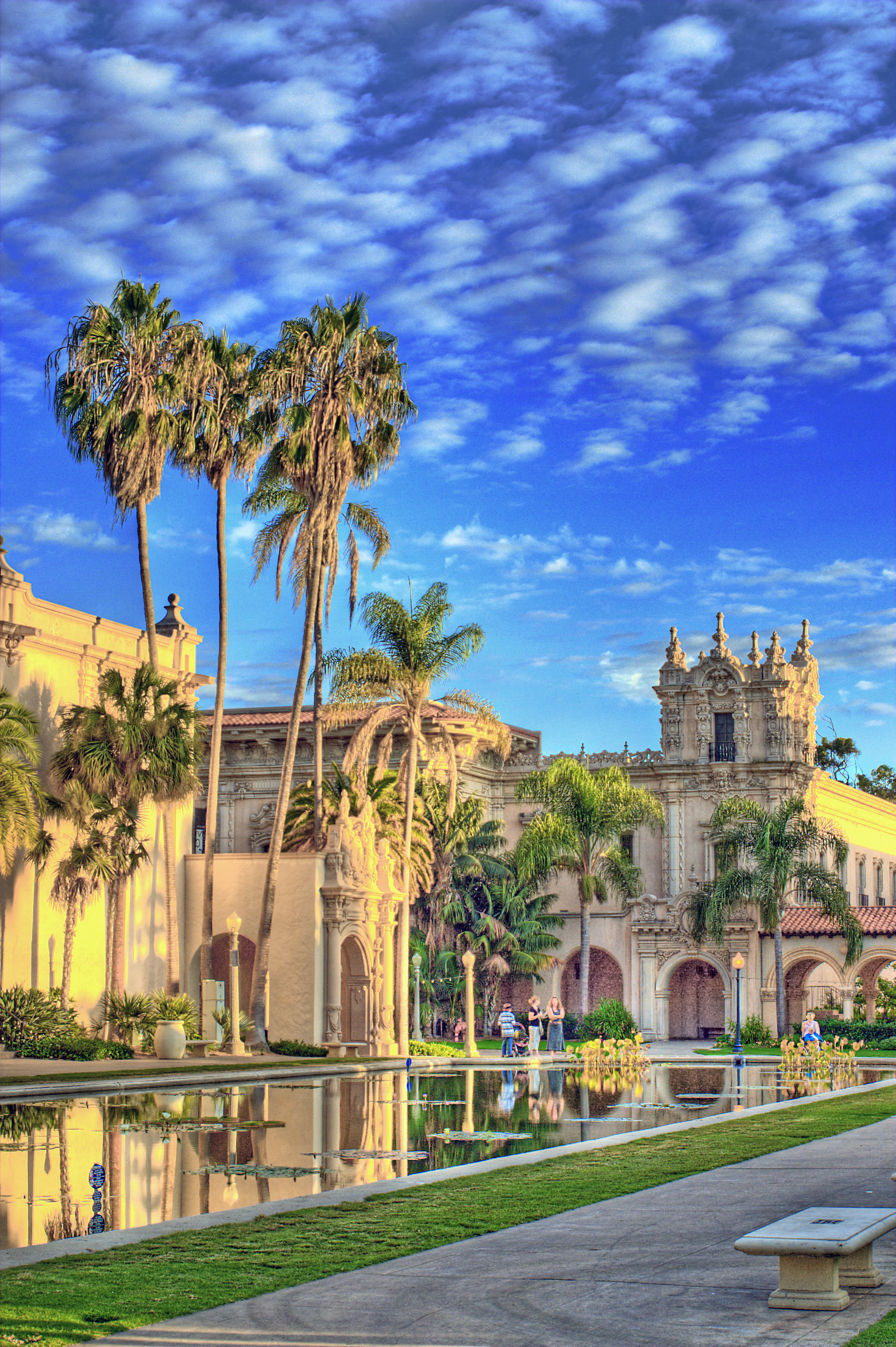
- Balboa Park as seen in 2007, site of the 1935 California Pacific International Exposition, in San Diego

Overview
- BIE-class: Unrecognized exposition
- Name: California Pacific International Exposition

Specialized expositions

The California Pacific International Exposition was an exposition held in San Diego, California, during May 29, 1935–November 11, 1935 and February 12, 1936–September 9, 1936. The exposition was held in Balboa Park, San Diego's large central urban park, which had also been the site of the earlier Panama–California Exposition in 1915.

The Exposition was held to promote San Diego and support its economy, which had slowed with the country's Great Depression. The first year was such a financial and attendance success that it was held over for a second year. The exposition had hundreds of exhibits on history, the arts, horticulture, ethnic cultures, science, and industry. Some concessions and exhibits were unusual, such as the Gold Gulch, Lost Continent of Mu, Zoro Garden Nudist Colony, and the "One Ton Mechanical Man."

== History ==
The idea for an exposition came from Frank Drugan, a newcomer to San Diego, California, who arrived in 1933. He recognized the potential of the buildings in Balboa Park left over from the 1915–16 exposition; the buildings had been designed to be temporary, but had been refurbished and upgraded several times and were available for use. In addition, Chicago's "Century of Progress" fair was just ending, and many of its exhibits could be transported for use in another fair. That exposition had paid for itself, and he was sure a San Diego exposition could do so as well. He promoted the idea of a new exposition, using the existing buildings and adding new ones, as a way of boosting San Diego's economy. He convinced local business people to support the idea.

The Exposition incorporated in August 1934. Construction of new buildings began in January 1935. The project was rushed through for a May opening. The foundations of some structures, such as the Electric Building and the Ford Building, were laid even before the final plans for the buildings had been drawn up. During March and April, 2,700 people worked around the clock on the Exposition. Approximately 65% of them were relief workers whose wages were paid by the federal government; the remainder were employees of private contractors.

== The Motion Picture Hall of Fame exhibit ==
The Hollywood Motion Picture Hall of Fame exhibit, at the now-called in 1935–36, had a stock company of actors that signed with the Screen Actors Guild and The Dominos Club of Hollywood (social organization for actresses, including: Carole Lombard, Thelma Todd, and ZaSu Pitts).

== Architecture ==
The buildings from the 1915 fair were in Spanish Colonial Revival architecture style, designed by Bertram Goodhue and Carleton Winslow. Architect Richard Requa designed the new permanent buildings to be added for the 1935 fair. He wrote that his goal was to relate pre-Columbian Indian buildings and temples, like those found in the Southwest and Mexico, to the modern era; his model was the 1915 New Mexico Building, which he remodeled into a Palace of Education. Many of the new large buildings were in this style, including the California State Building (now the San Diego Automotive Museum), Palace of Electricity (now a gymnasium), and Palace of Water and Transportation (no longer existent).

Other new buildings included:

- The Old Globe Theatre, a copy of a theatre built for the Chicago fair, which in turn was a copy of the original Globe Theatre in London. During the Exposition it showed 50-minute adaptations of plays by William Shakespeare. After the fair it was remodeled and roofed over, and continued to show theatrical productions. The building burned down in 1978 but was rebuilt and is now the focus of a three-theater complex.
- The circular Ford Building, generally regarded as the architectural wonder of the Exposition, now the home of the San Diego Air & Space Museum.
- The Ford Bowl, now called the Starlight Bowl, an amphitheater used for concerts and theatrical productions.
- The House of Pacific Relations, a collection of fifteen small tan red-tiled cottages which were dedicated to different foreign countries; these "International Cottages" are still in use by a consortium of groups from 32 countries as a focus of educational activities, outreach, and international festivals.
- Spanish Village, a group of six buildings used for shops, restaurants, and a children's theater; it is now the Spanish Village Art Center featuring 37 working art studios and galleries.

While some of the extensive gardens from the 1915 Panama California Exposition remained, they were redesigned from formal gardens to gardens overflowing with lush abundance of exotic plants. Many were reimagined by renowned architect Richard Requa who was influenced by the gardens he had seen traveling in Spain. Today's Alcazar garden, Zoro Garden, and the garden at Cafe del Rey Moro are all Requa designs.

== Commemorative coins and stamps ==
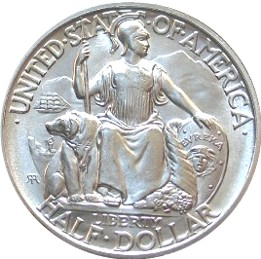
Obverse of the 1935-36 commemorative California Pacific International Exposition half dollar

In honor of the California Pacific International Exposition, the federal government released a commemorative silver half dollar.

A three-cent postage stamp (Scott catalog 773) was also issued. It presents a view of the Exposition grounds, and has the same wording as the reverse of the half dollar, plus the dates "1535 1935". Over 100 million were printed, making this a very common issue.

== Statistics ==
The Exposition took ten months to build. It attracted 7,220,000 visitors during its 377 days of operation. Visitors brought US$37.7 million to San Diego. The cost was US$20 million. Admission was 50 cents for adults and 25 cents for children 2–11. Four restaurants provided meals: Cafe of the World, Palisades Cafe, Spanish Kitchens, and the Pioneer Days Restaurant. Twenty-one nations participated: Argentina, British Empire, Chile, China, Czechoslovakia, Denmark, Germany, Honduras, Irish Free State, Italy, Japan, Nicaragua, Norway, Panama, Paraguay, Portugal, Sweden, Uruguay, United States and Yugoslavia.

== Legacy ==
Park improvements amounted to US$6 million. The exposition was so popular that some buildings were rebuilt to be made more permanent. Many buildings or reconstructed versions remain in use today, and are used by several museums and theatres in Balboa Park.

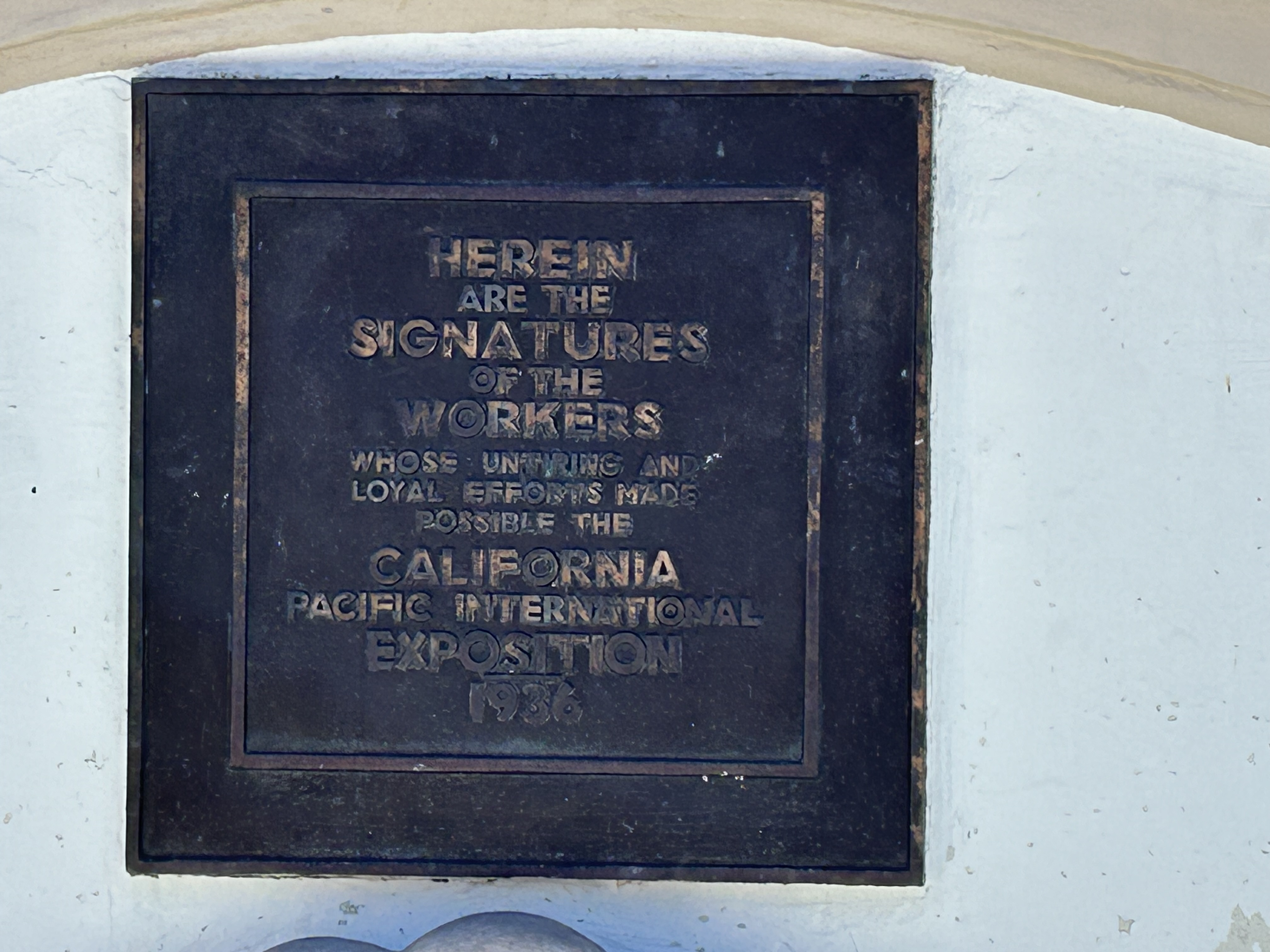
Plaque dedicated to the workers of the 1936 Exposition

In the early 1960s destruction of a few of the buildings and their replacement by aesthetically clashing modern architecture style of the new buildings "created an uproar" in San Diego's community. A 'Committee of One Hundred' was formed by citizens to protect the park buildings. The Committee convinced the City Council to enact resolutions that now require any new buildings to be designed and constructed in the Spanish Colonial Revival style. The Committee also worked with various government agencies for the remaining original buildings to be declared a National Historic Landmark, which was awarded in 1978. In the latter 1990s the buildings most deteriorated or that had burned were carefully rebuilt to restore the original style and scale of the park's public spaces.

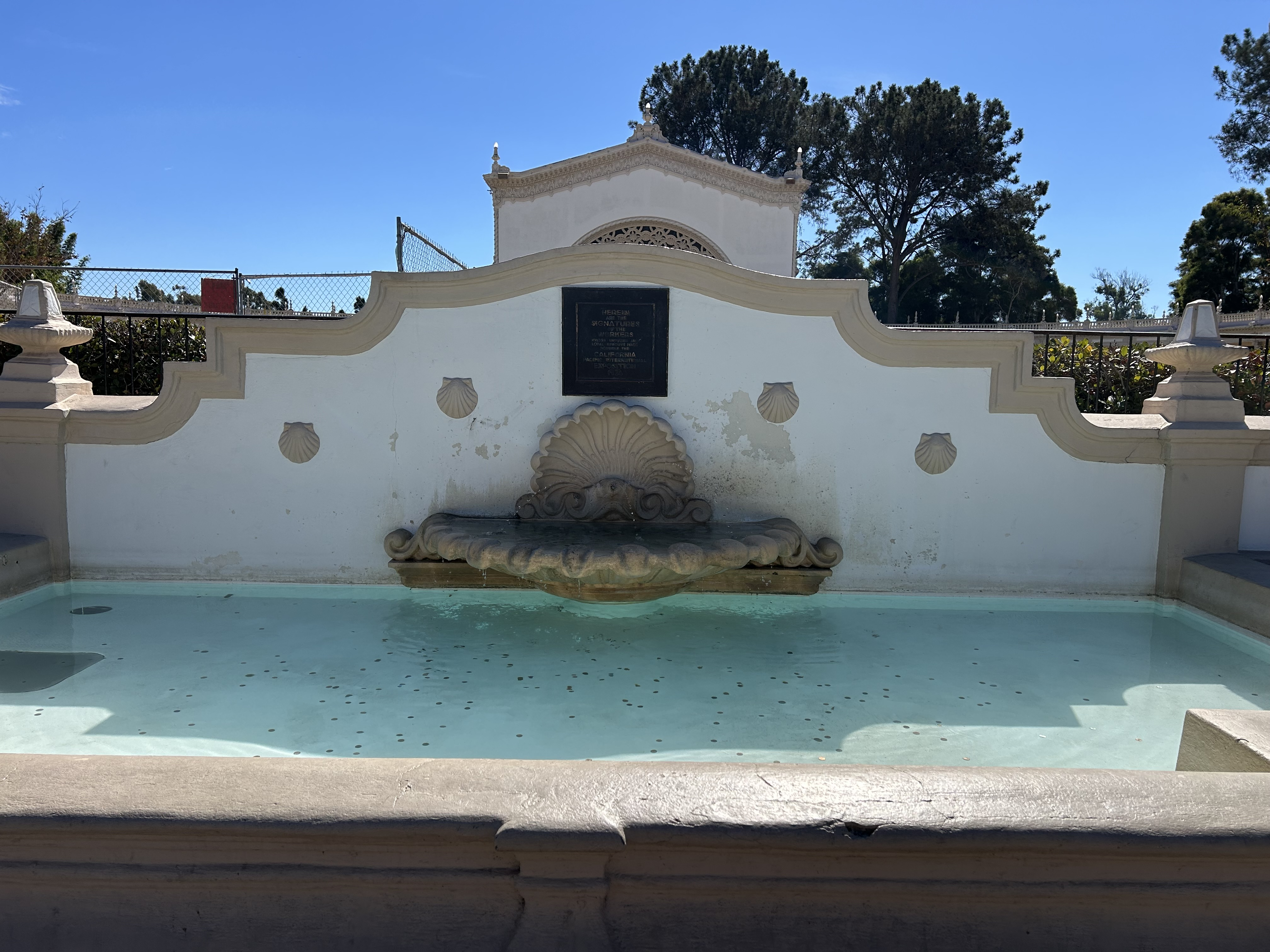
Fountain dedicated to the 1936 Exposition workers

In October 2010, the National Building Museum in Washington, D.C. opened an exhibition titled Designing Tomorrow: America's World's Fairs of the 1930s. This exhibition, which was available for view until September 2011, prominently featured the California Pacific International Exposition.

Featured on the front side of Spreckels Organ Pavilion is a fountain dedicated to the workers of the 1936 California Pacific International Exposition.
