= San Diego Museum of Art =

Art museum in California, US

The San Diego Museum of Art
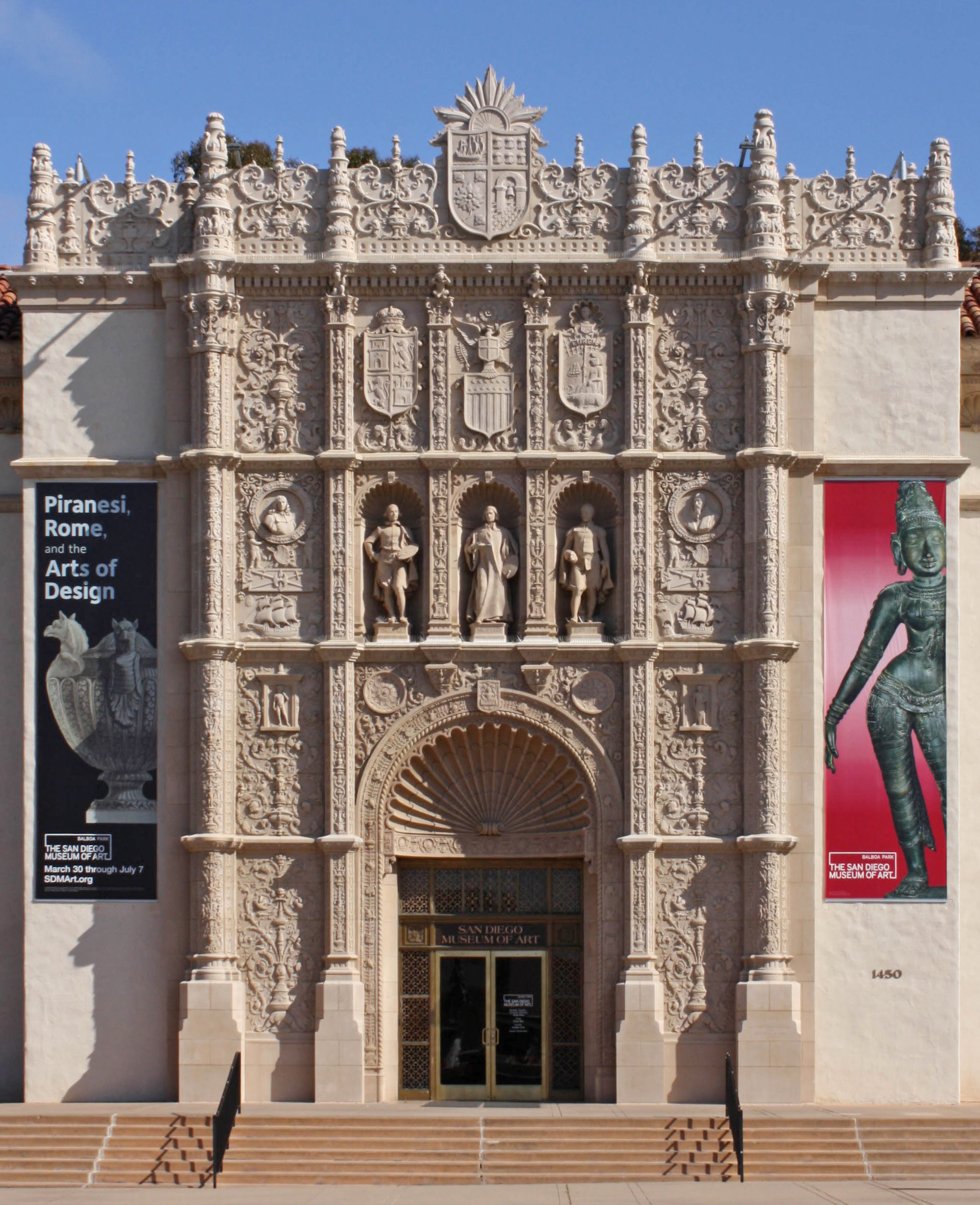
- The museum's façade

- Location within San Diego Location within California Location within the United States
- Established: 1926
- Location: 1450 El Prado in Balboa Park, San Diego, California, U.S.
- Coordinates: 32.7322°N 117.1505°W
- Type: Art Museum
- Website: sdmart.org

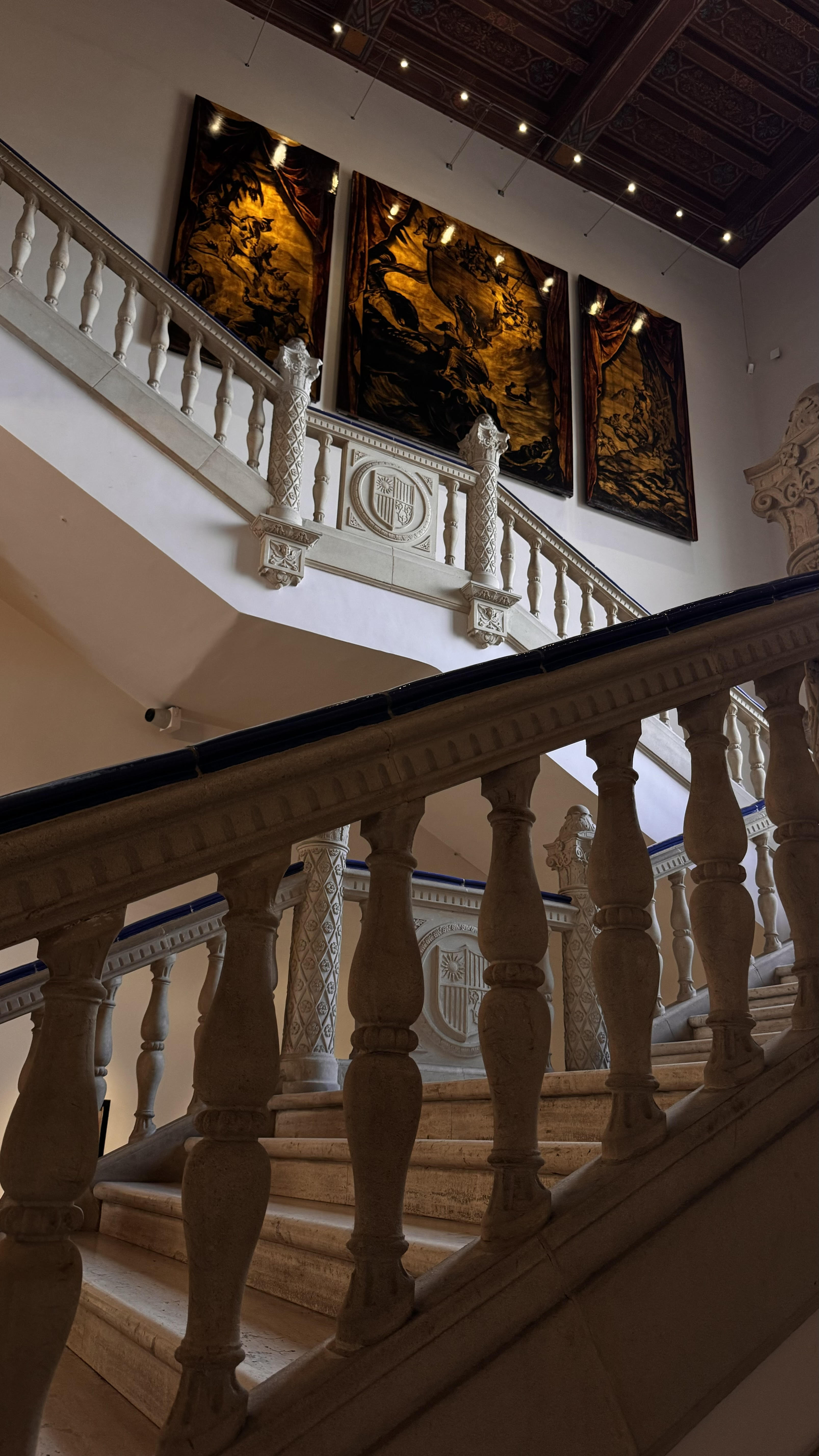
The main stairway of the San Diego Museum of Art, 2024.

The San Diego Museum of Art is a fine art museum in Balboa Park in San Diego, California, that houses a broad collection with particular strength in Spanish art. It opened as the Fine Arts Gallery of San Diego on February 28, 1926, and changed to its current name in 1978. The official Balboa Park website calls it "the region's oldest and largest art museum". Nearly half a million people visit the museum each year.

== Structure ==
The museum building was designed by architects William Templeton Johnson and Robert W. Snyder in a plateresque style to harmonize with existing structures from the Panama–California Exposition of 1915. The dominant feature of the façade is a heavily ornamented door inspired by a doorway at the University of Salamanca. The Cathedral of Valladolid also influenced the museum's exterior design, and the architects derived interior motifs from the Santa Cruz Hospital of Toledo, Spain. The original construction took two years. Sponsor Appleton S. Bridges donated the building to the City of San Diego upon its completion. In 1966 the museum added a west wing and a sculpture court which doubled its size, and an east wing in 1974 further increased its exhibition space. Plans are underway for a renovation to the rotunda, sculpture garden, façade, auditorium, and other features.

== Collections ==
The museum's collections are encyclopedic in nature, with pieces ranging in date from 5000 BC to 2012 AD. The museum's strength is in Spanish works by Murillo, Zurbarán, Cotán, Ribera and El Greco. Much of the museum's old master collection was donated by sisters Anne, Amy, and Irene Putnam. The museum's first major acquisition was the 1939 purchase of Francisco Goya's El Marques de Sofraga, which had belonged to a private family collection until that time and had never before been on public exhibition. The Putnam sisters provided financial backing for the purchase. The following year, director Reginald Poland acquired a portrait by Giovanni Bellini for the museum's collection. Then in 1941 the museum purchased a Diego Velázquez portrait of the Infanta Margarita of Spain, which was possibly a study for a larger portrait of her in Vienna. Other major benefactors during the museum's first quarter century were Archer M. Huntington and Mr. and Mrs. Henry Timken, whose small art collection is housed in the nearby Timken Museum of Art, established in 1965. In 2012, the Museum of Art received 48 German Expressionist paintings, drawings and prints from a range of artists, including Otto Dix, Egon Schiele, Alexej von Jawlensky, Gabriele Münter and Gustav Klimt from the collection of Vance E. Kondon and his wife Elisabeth Giesberger.

The museum houses works by Italian masters Giorgione, Giambattista Pittoni, Giotto, Veronese, Luini and Canaletto. Works by Rubens, Hals and van Dyck represent the Northern European School. The museum regularly hosts touring exhibits and has lately been working to display its standard collection in new ways, including an upstairs gallery discussing information that can be gathered by looking at the back of the canvas. The exhibition is complemented with a large collection of images, including portraits, Arnold Newman's work, and Mexican landscapes from the early twentieth century.

== Collection highlights ==
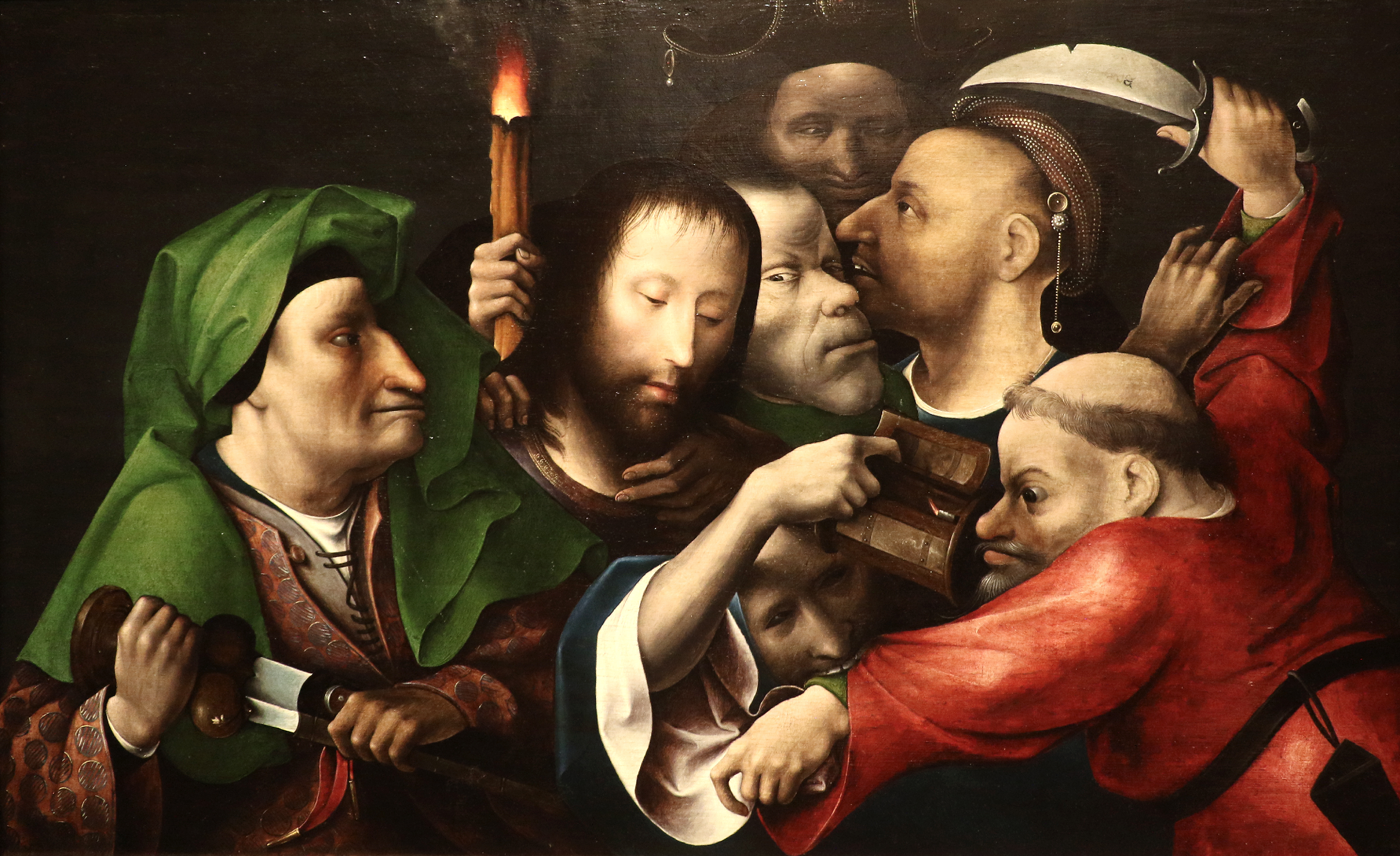
Workshop of Hieronymus Bosch, The Arrest of Christ, c. 1515, oil on panel

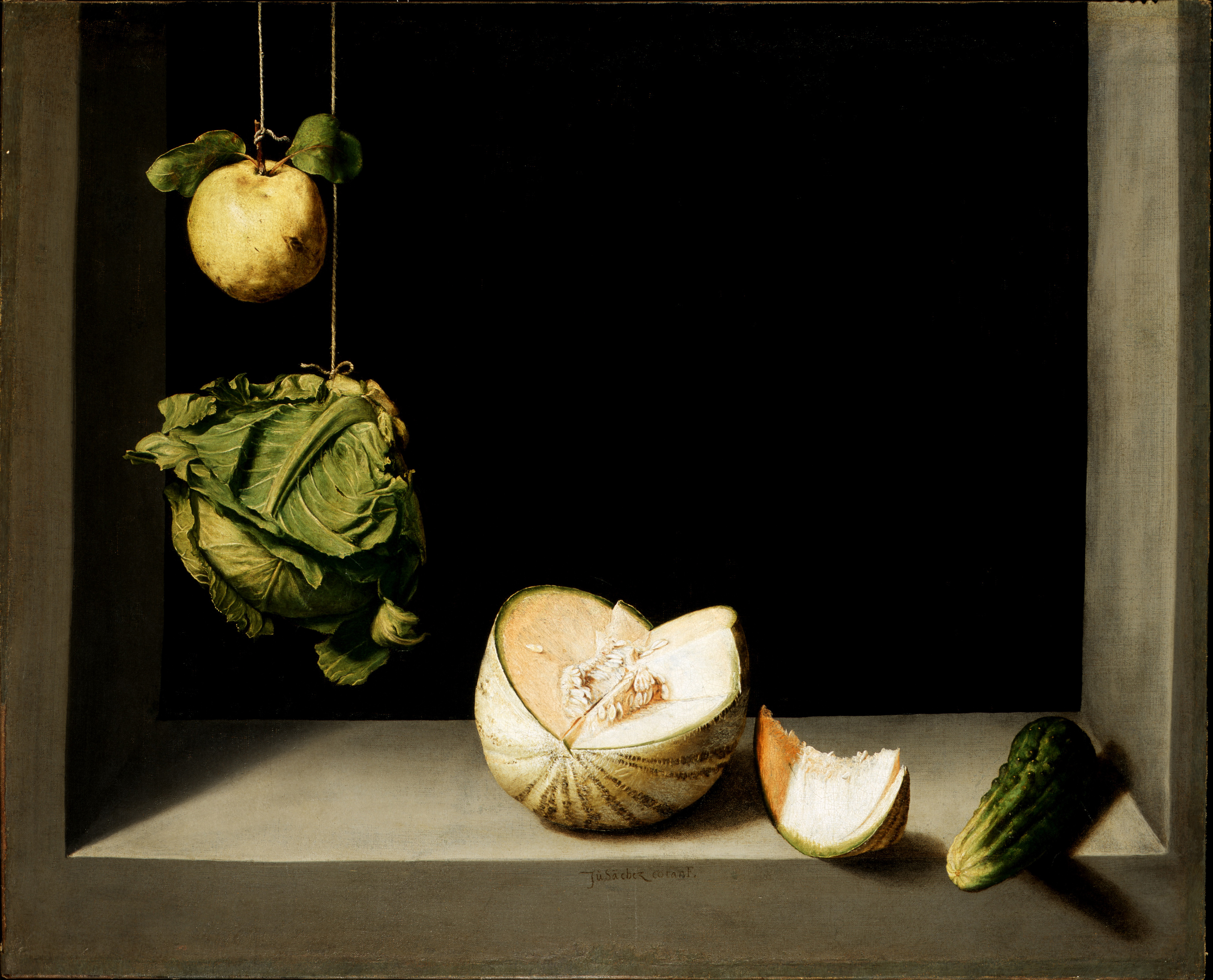
Juan Sánchez Cotán, 1602, Quince, Cabbage, Melon, and Cucumber

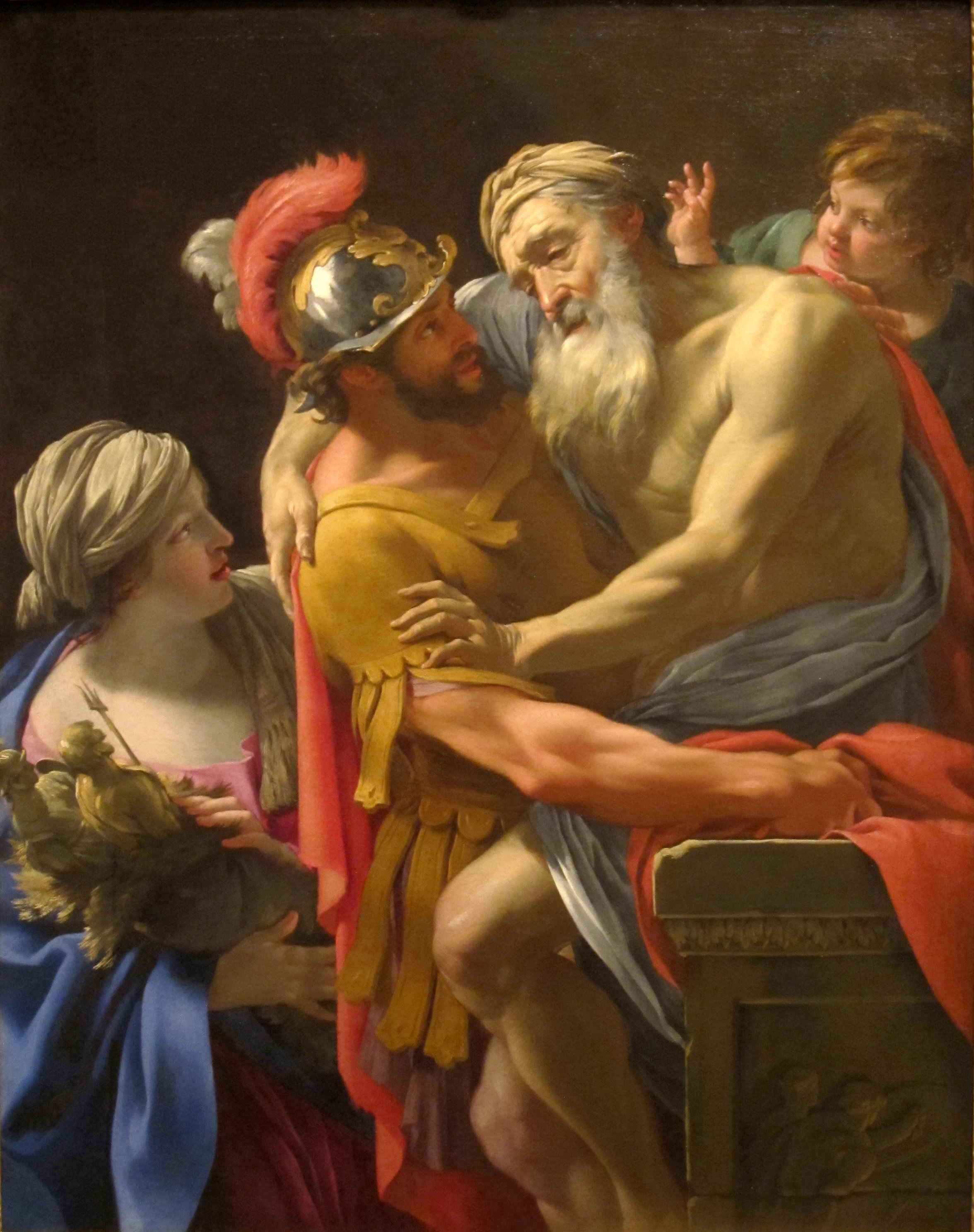
Simon Vouet, c. 1635, Aeneas and his Father Fleeing Troy

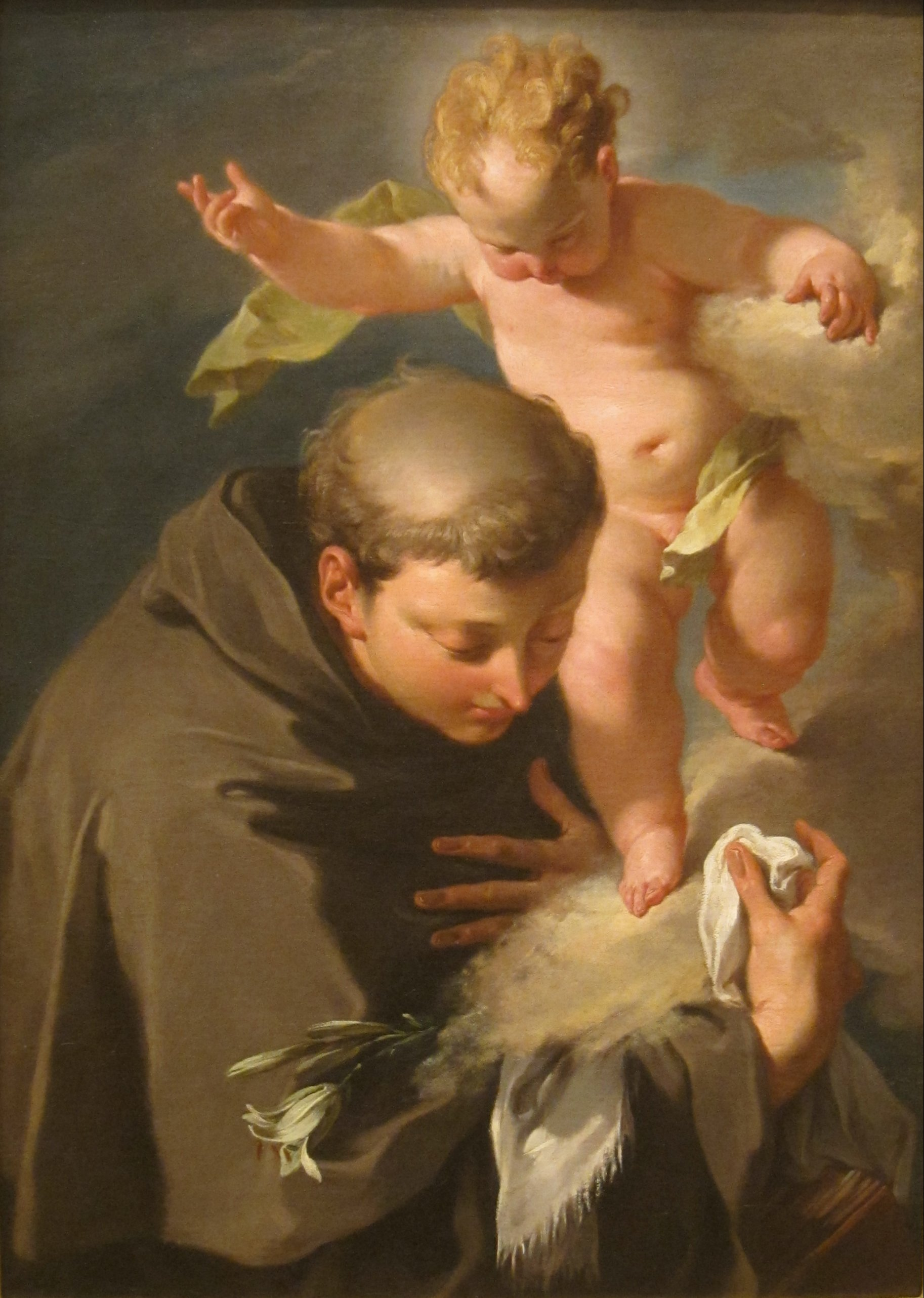
Giambattista Pittoni, 1730, The Vision of Saint Anthony of Padua, oil on Canvas, 35 1/2 in. x 23 1/4 in.

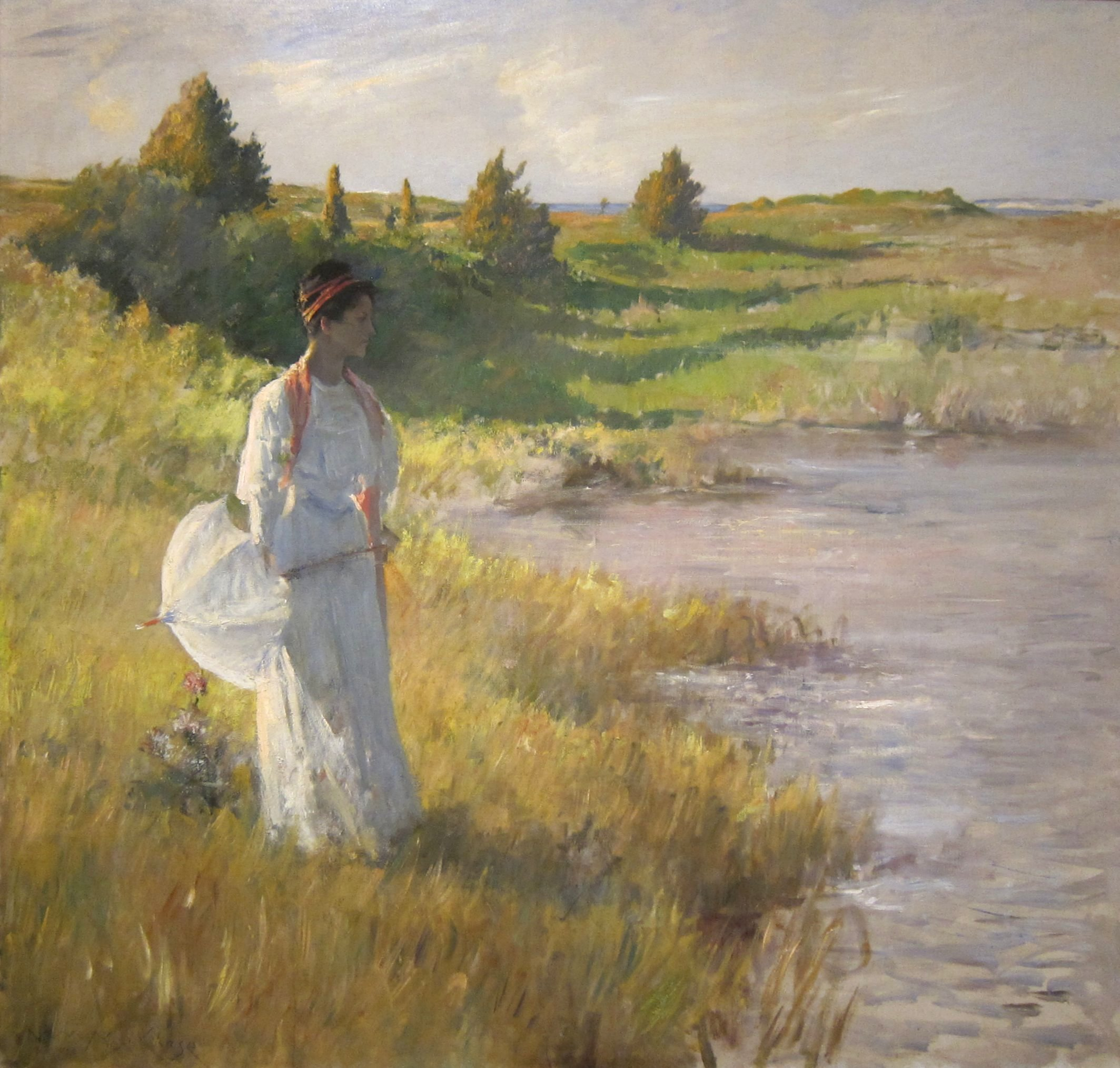
William Merritt Chase, c. 1895, An Afternoon Stroll

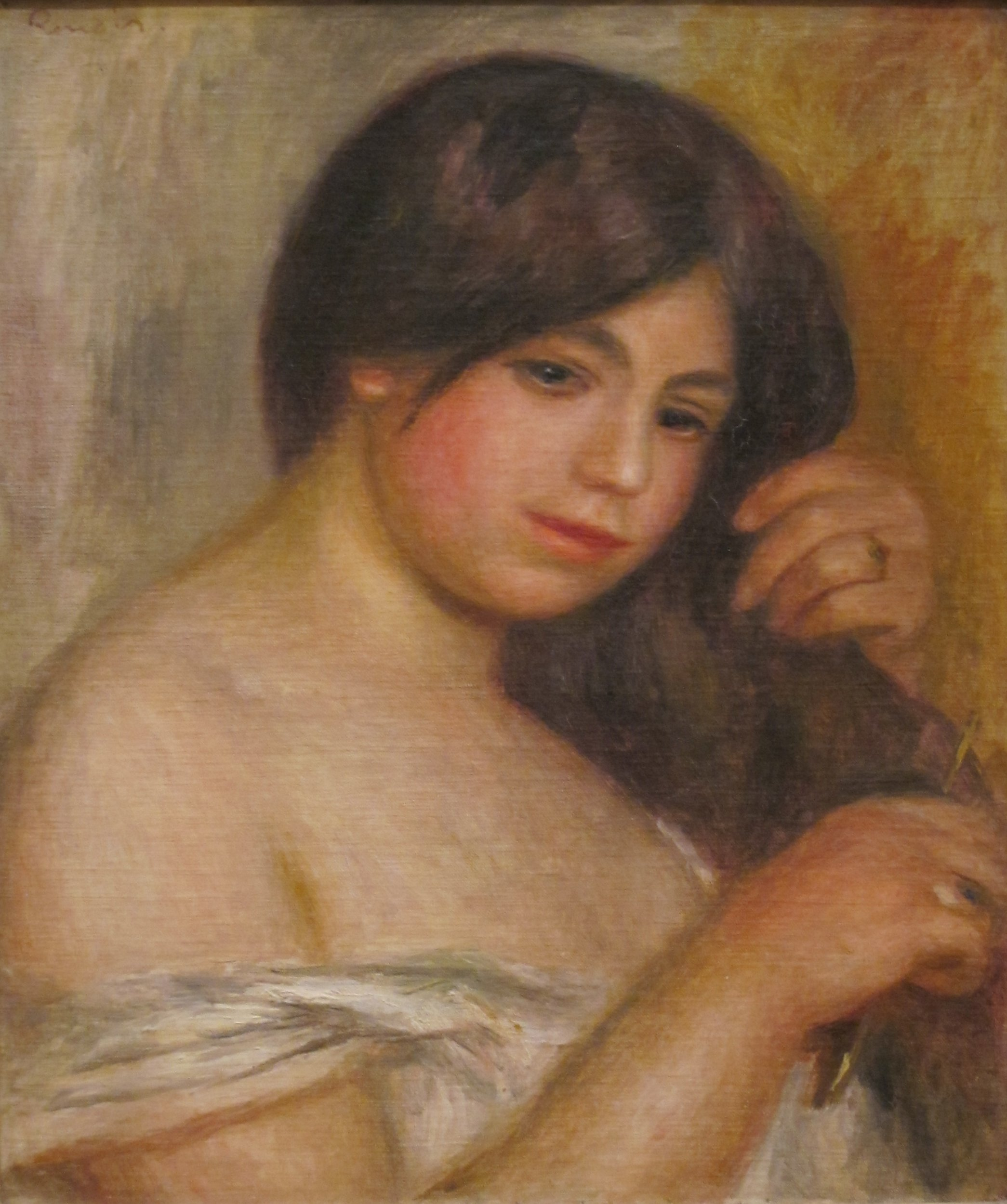
Auguste Renoir, 1907, Woman Combing her Hair''

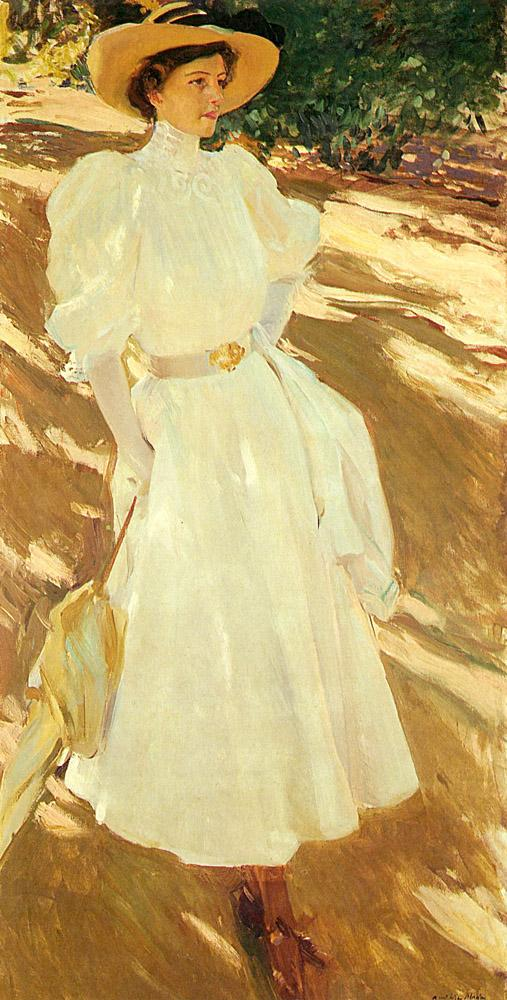
Joaquin Sorolla, 1907, María en La Granja

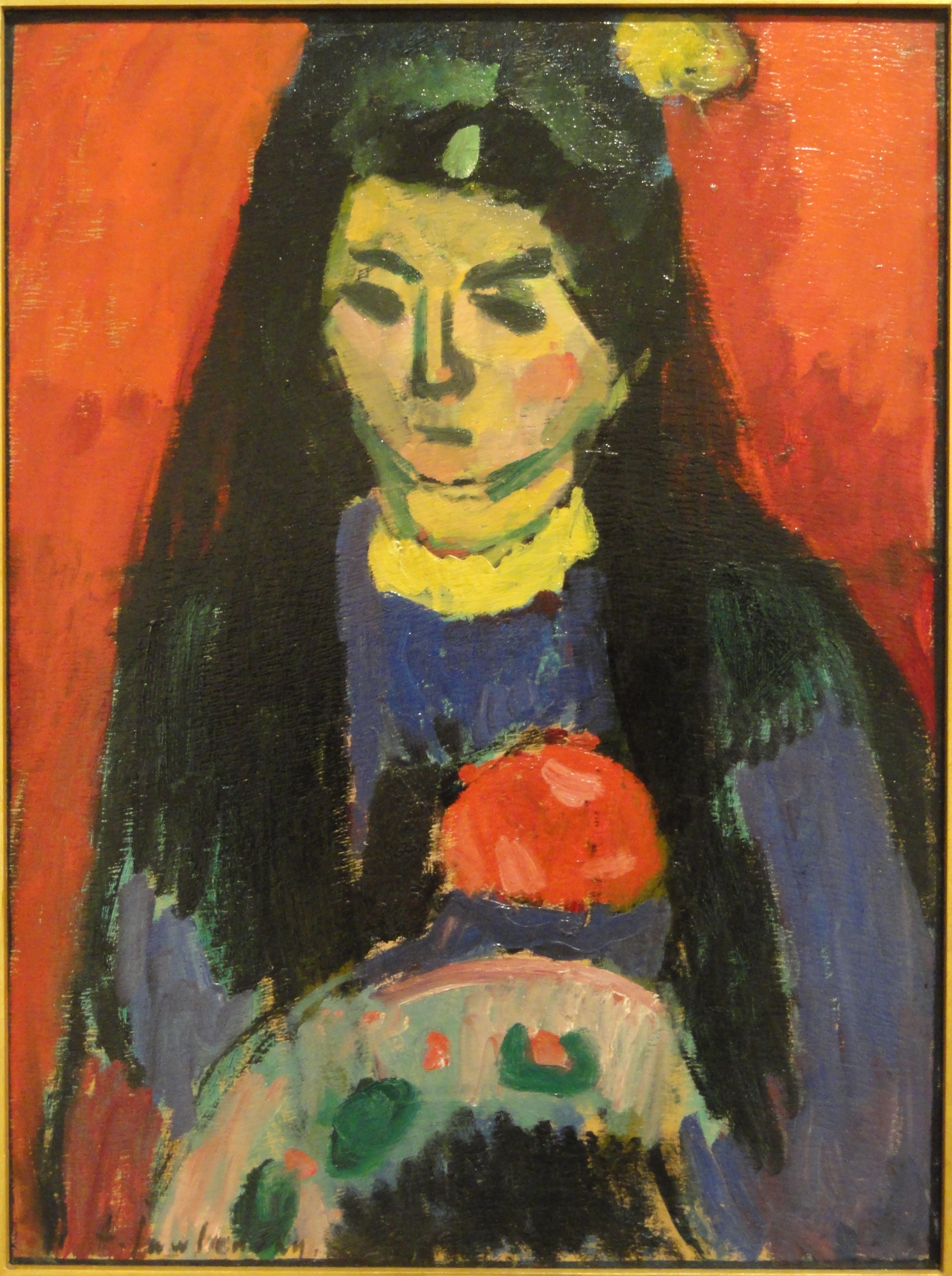
Alexej von Jawlensky, 1910, Red Blossom, oil on board

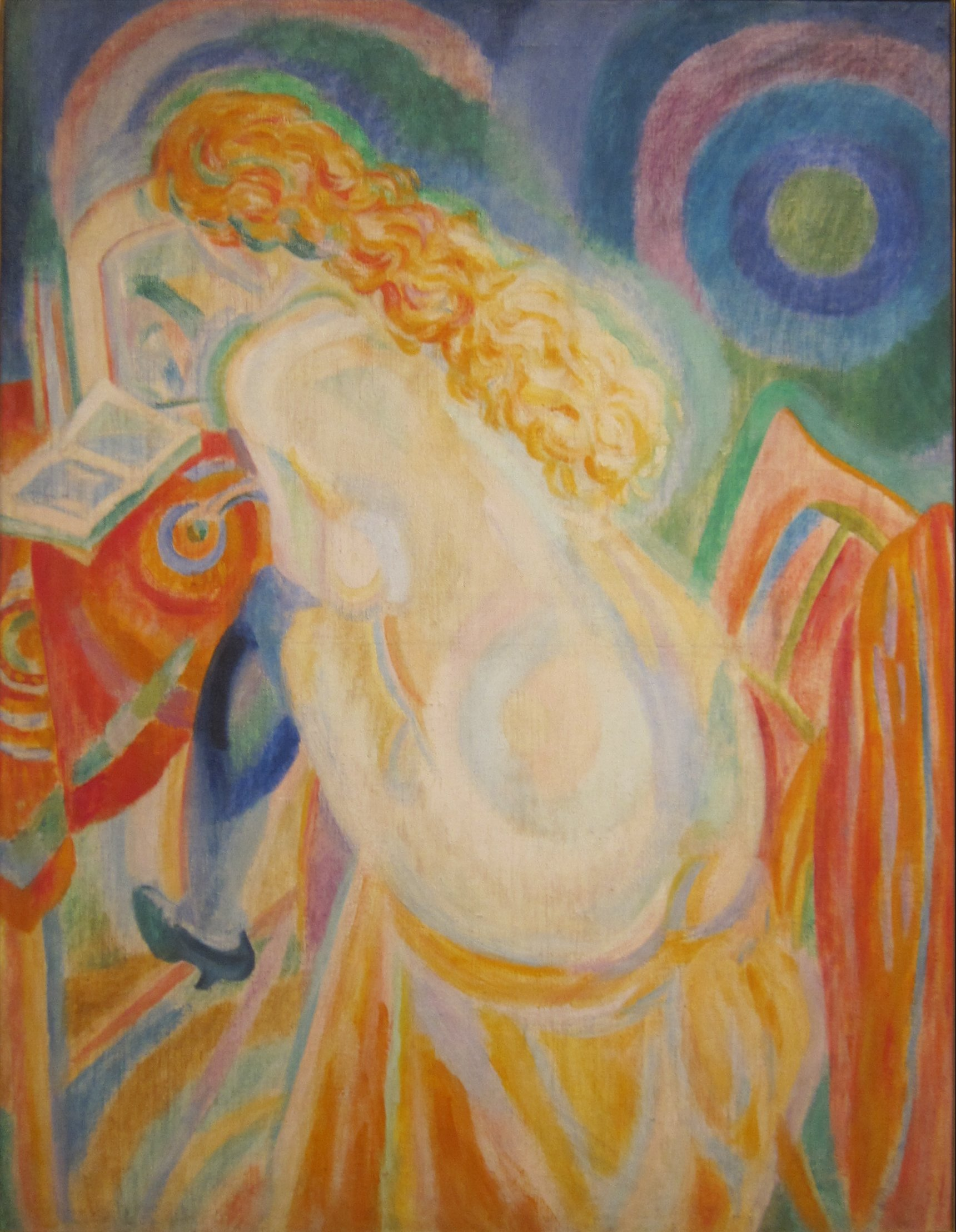
Robert Delaunay, 1915, Female Nude Reading

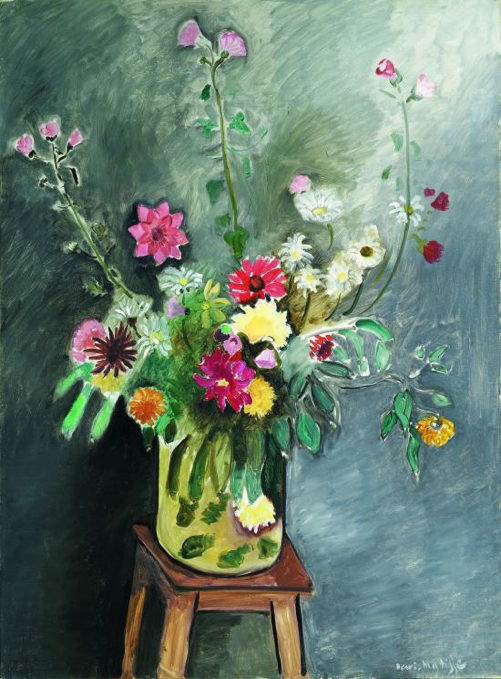
Henri Matisse, 1917–18, Fleurs (Bouguet), oil on canvas, 139.7 x 102.2 cm

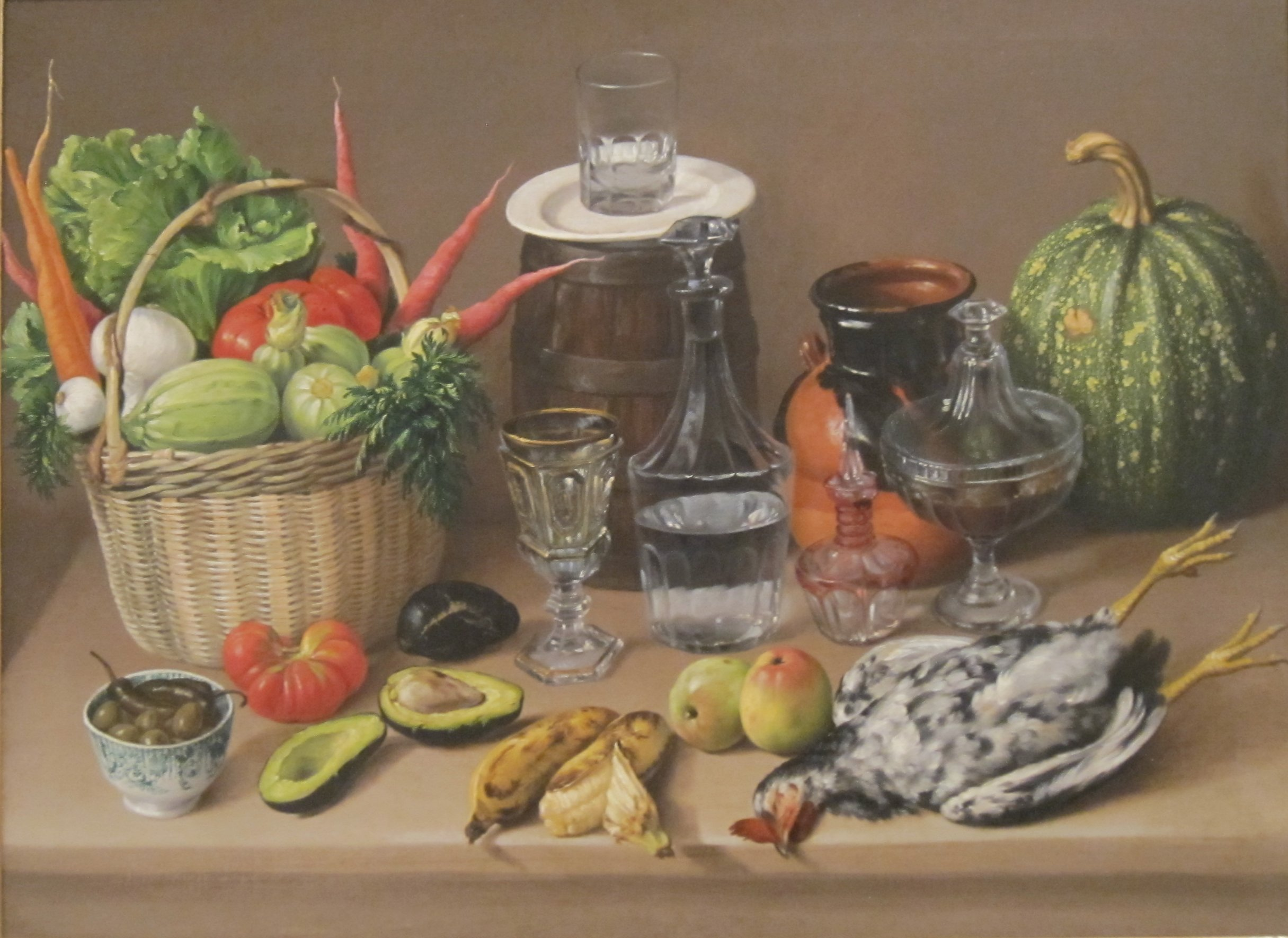
Still-life, oil on canvas painting by José Agustín Arrieta, c. 1870, The San Diego Museum of Art

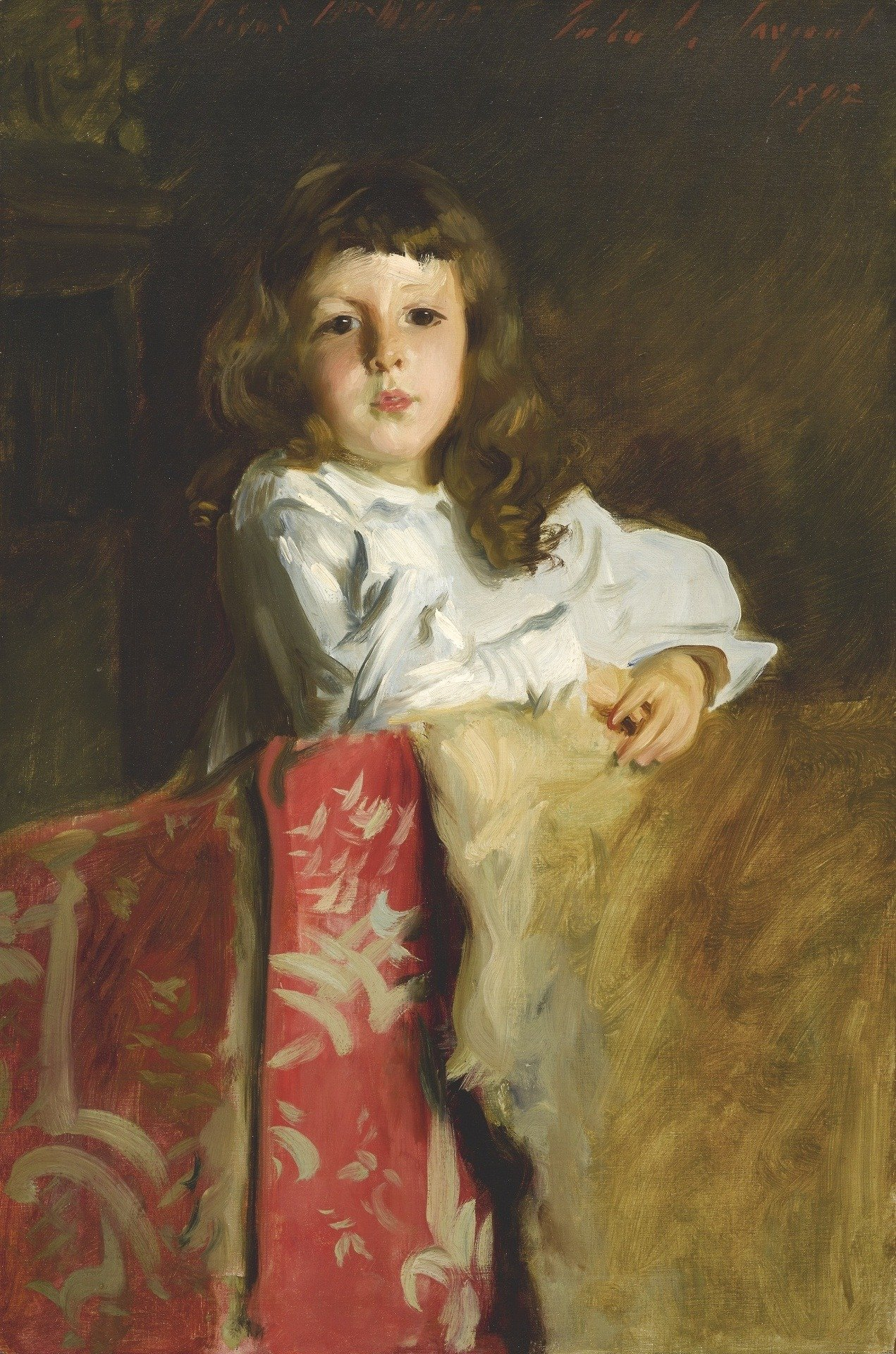
John Alfred Parsons Millet, John Singer Sargent c. 1892

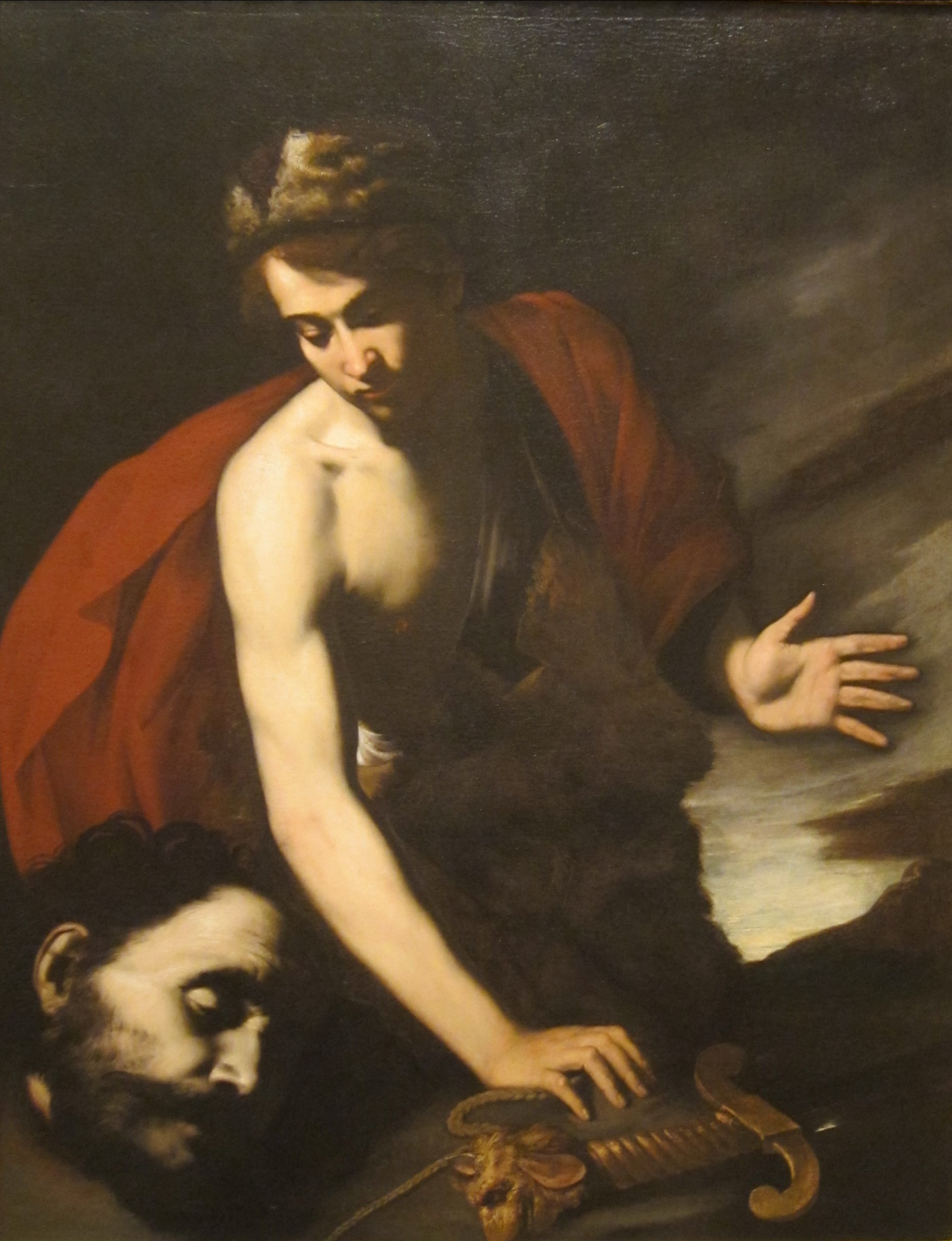
David with the Head of Goliath (Massimo Stanzione)) by Antonio de Bellis

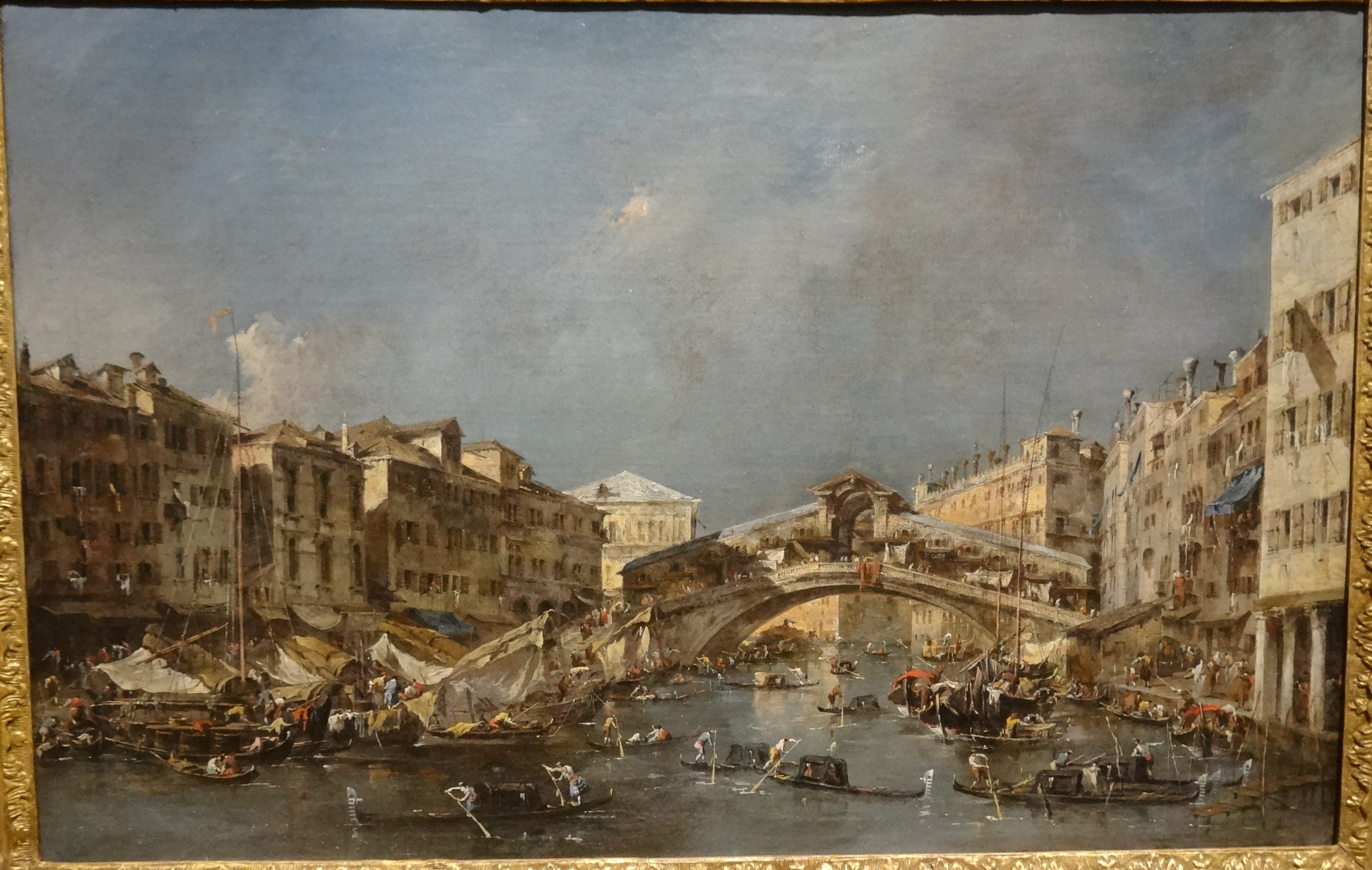
The Grand Canal with the Rialto Bridge from the South, oil on canvas painting by Francesco Guardi, c. 1775

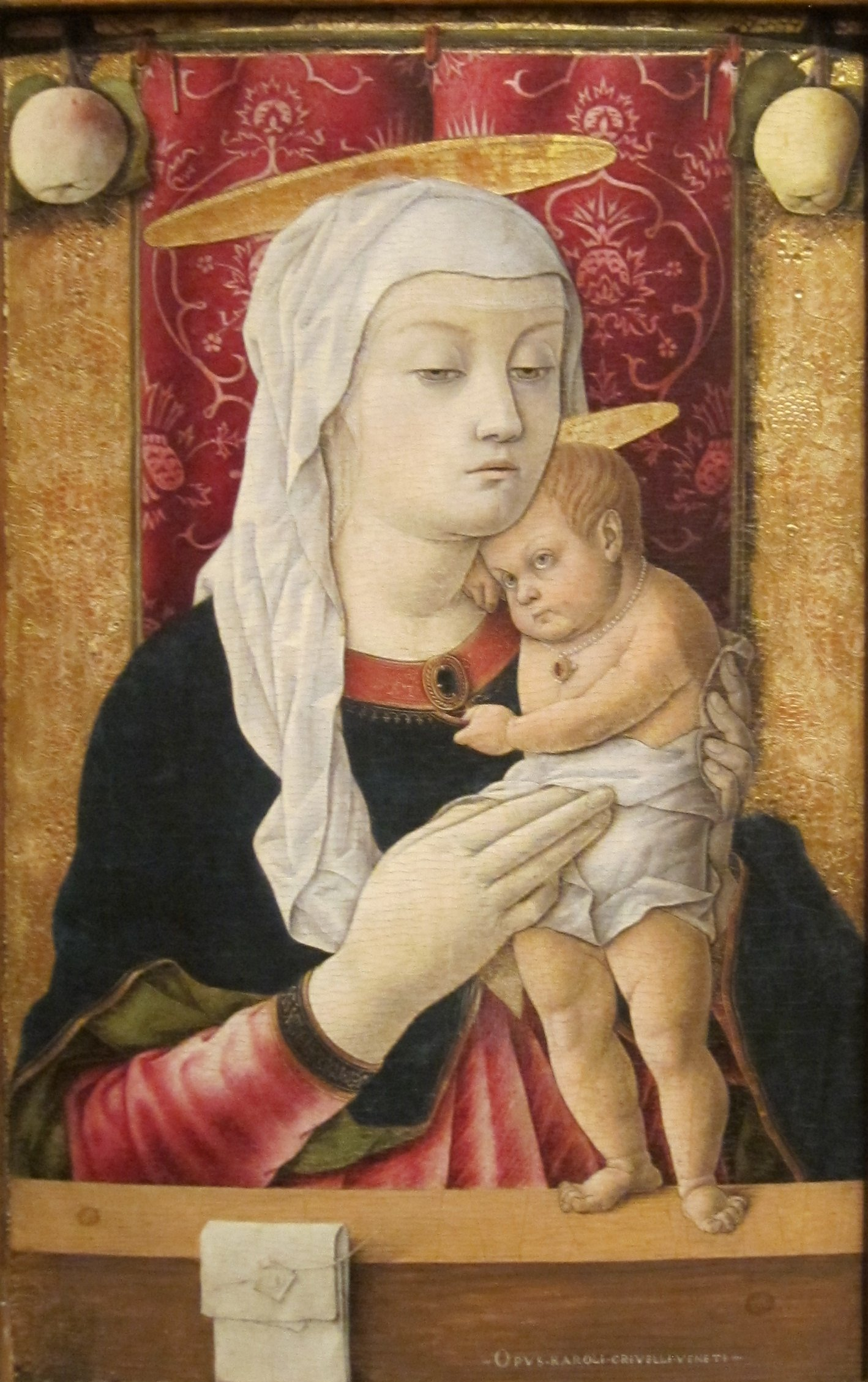
Huldschinsky Madonna (painting), tempera and oil on panel painting by Carlo Crivelli, c. 1468

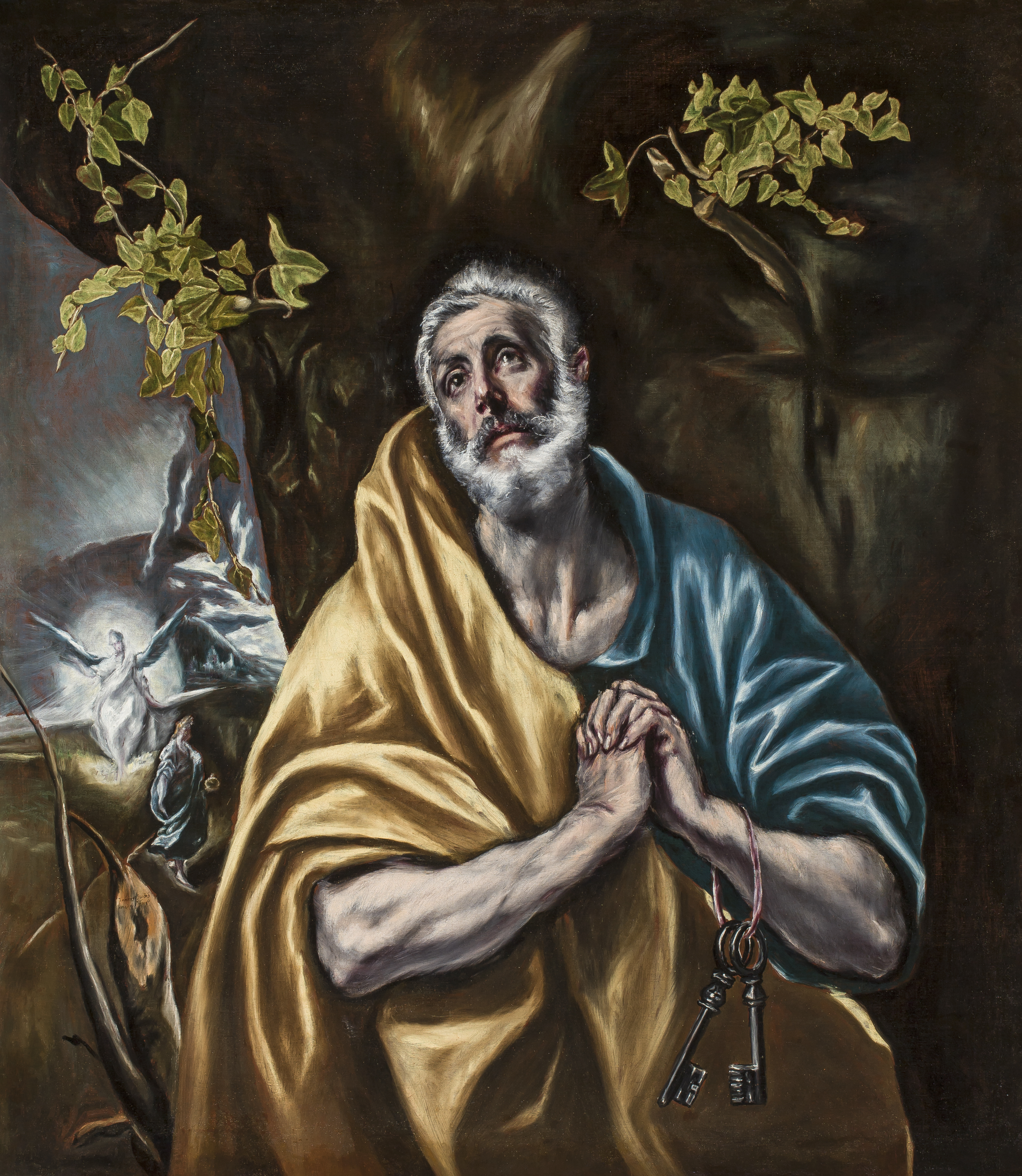
The Tears of Saint Peter (El Greco, San Diego)

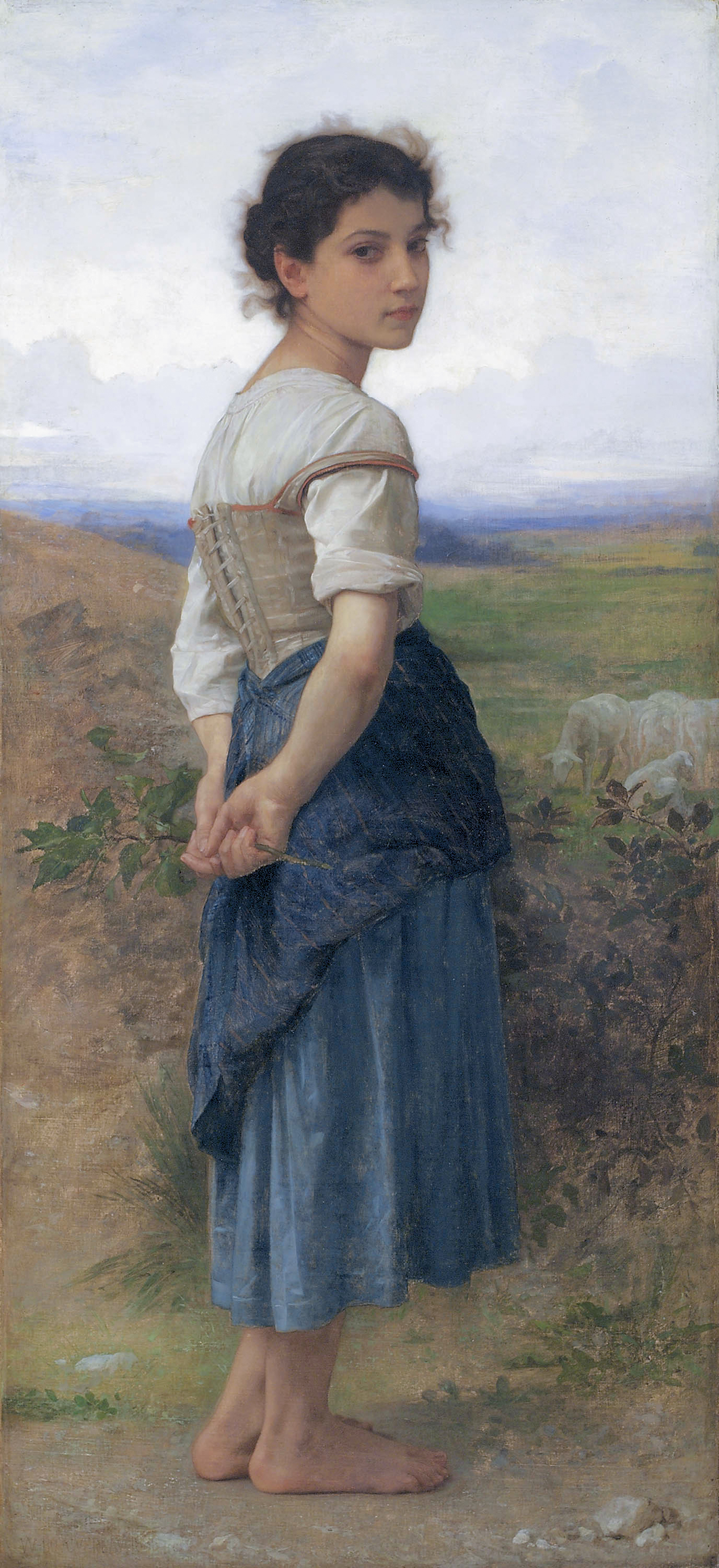
The young shepherdess, by William-Adolphe Bouguereau

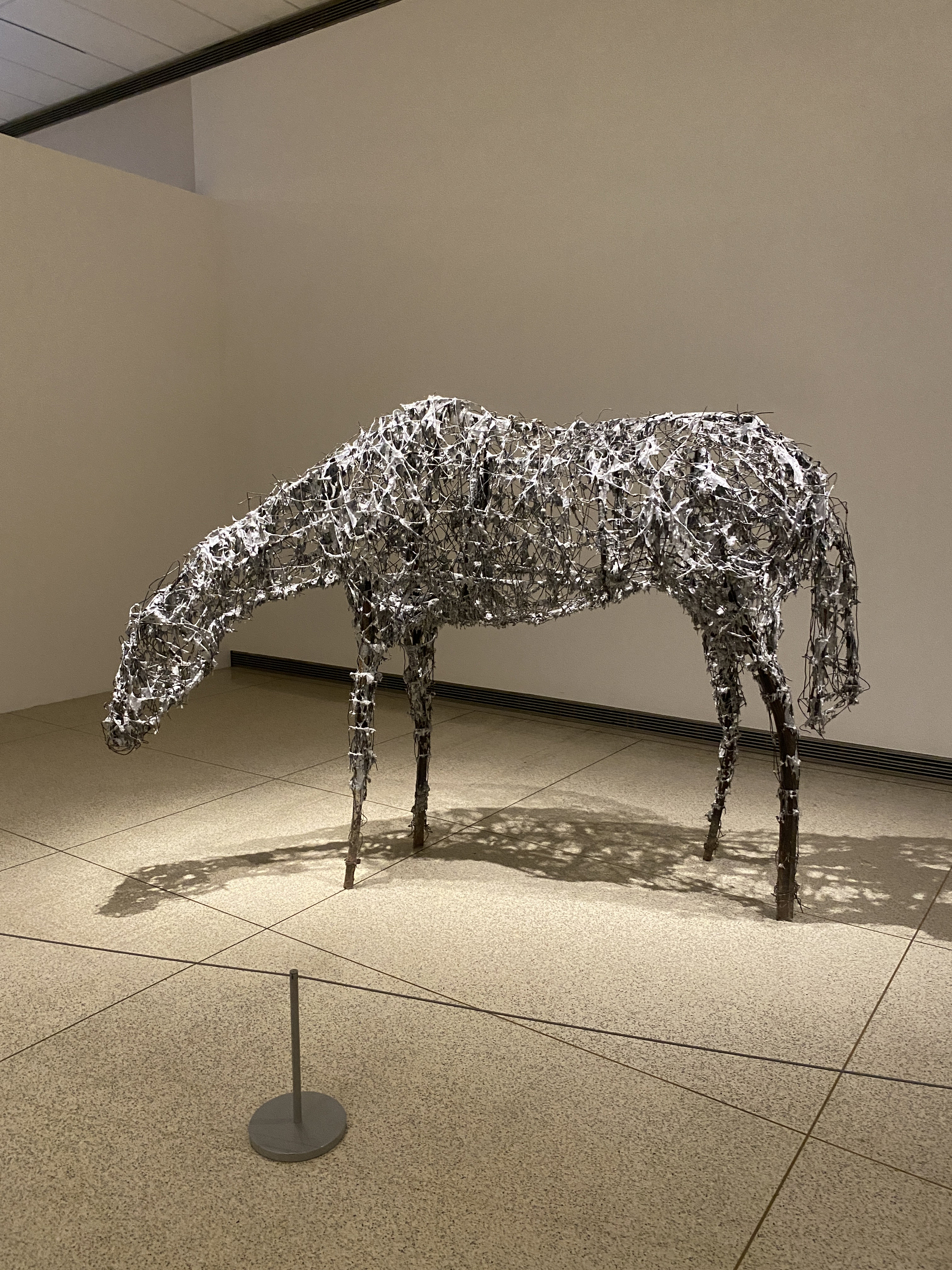
Aluminum Horse By Deborah Butterfield. Taken at the Museum of Art, Balboa Park, 2024.

== Special exhibitions ==
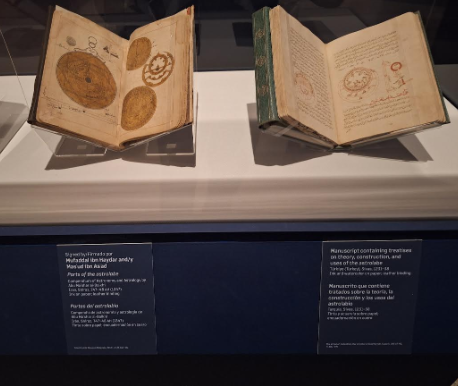
Exhibit of "Parts Of Astrolabe’’ and ‘’Manuscript Containing Treatises On Theory, Construction, And Uses Of The Astrolabe", Wonders of Creation: Art, Science, and Innovation in the Islamic World," 2024.

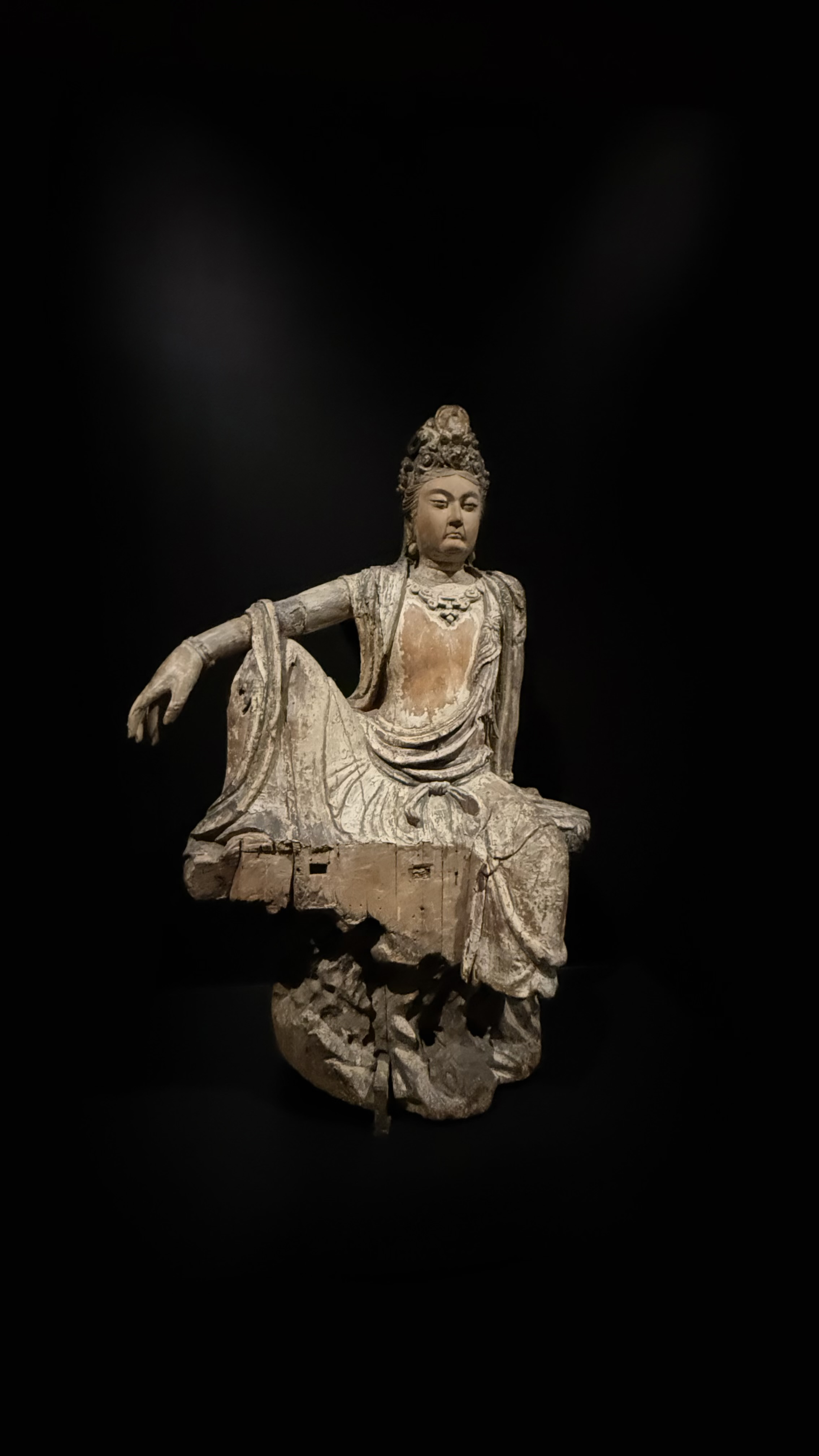
Bodhisattva Guanyin of the Southern Seas, 13th century, China

Important special exhibitions that the museum has hosted include The Precious Legacy (1984).

In 2024, the exhibit "Wonders of Creation: Art, Science, and Innovation in the Islamic World" features works spanning 13 centuries that show the intersection of art and science.

== Contemporary art programming ==
In 2010, the San Diego Museum of Art in conjunction with the Agitprop gallery, created The Summer Salon Series. The program, curated by Alexander Jarman and David White, featured local emerging artists who presented and performed temporary art works and workshops in direct response to the Toulouse-Lautrec exhibition. Each of the ten presentations involved Contemporary Artists' responses to the Modern Art on display in the museum.

== Special events ==
Each April since 1981, the museum has hosted its major fundraiser, "Art Alive". Floral designers use flowers and other organic materials to express their interpretation of a work of art from the museum's permanent collection. For four days the resulting creations are displayed next to the art work that inspired them. The museum also hosts events such as "Culture and Cocktails", which encourage attendees to sample the collection into the evening during extended opening hours or partake in social events centered in the gallery.

=== 100th anniversary ===
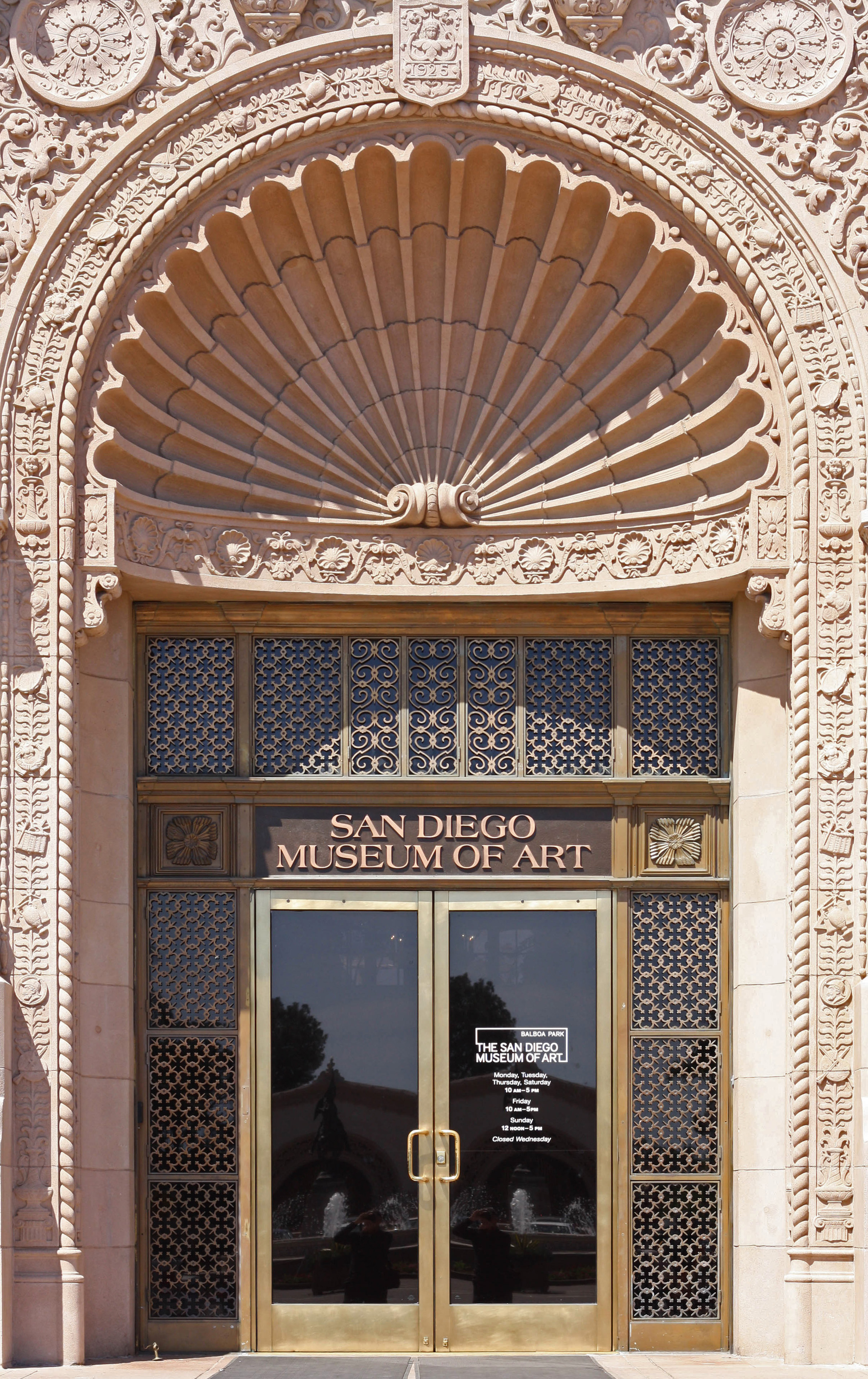
Front entrance of the San Diego Museum of Art

The San Diego Museum of Art celebrated its 100th anniversary in 2026 from January 24th through July 26th. The museum is considered Balboa Parks center piece with its community accessibility and Spanish Architecture inspired by the University of Salamanca. The celebration hosted many community events such as showcases from many famous painters, takes on the museum's exterior from local artists, and free admission into the museum with pop up performances. February 28th a cake party was served with unique special exhibitions, and personal anecdotes from visitors on the importance of the museum's existence.

== See also ==
- May S. Marcy Sculpture Garden
