= Antonio de Bellis =

17th-century Italian painter

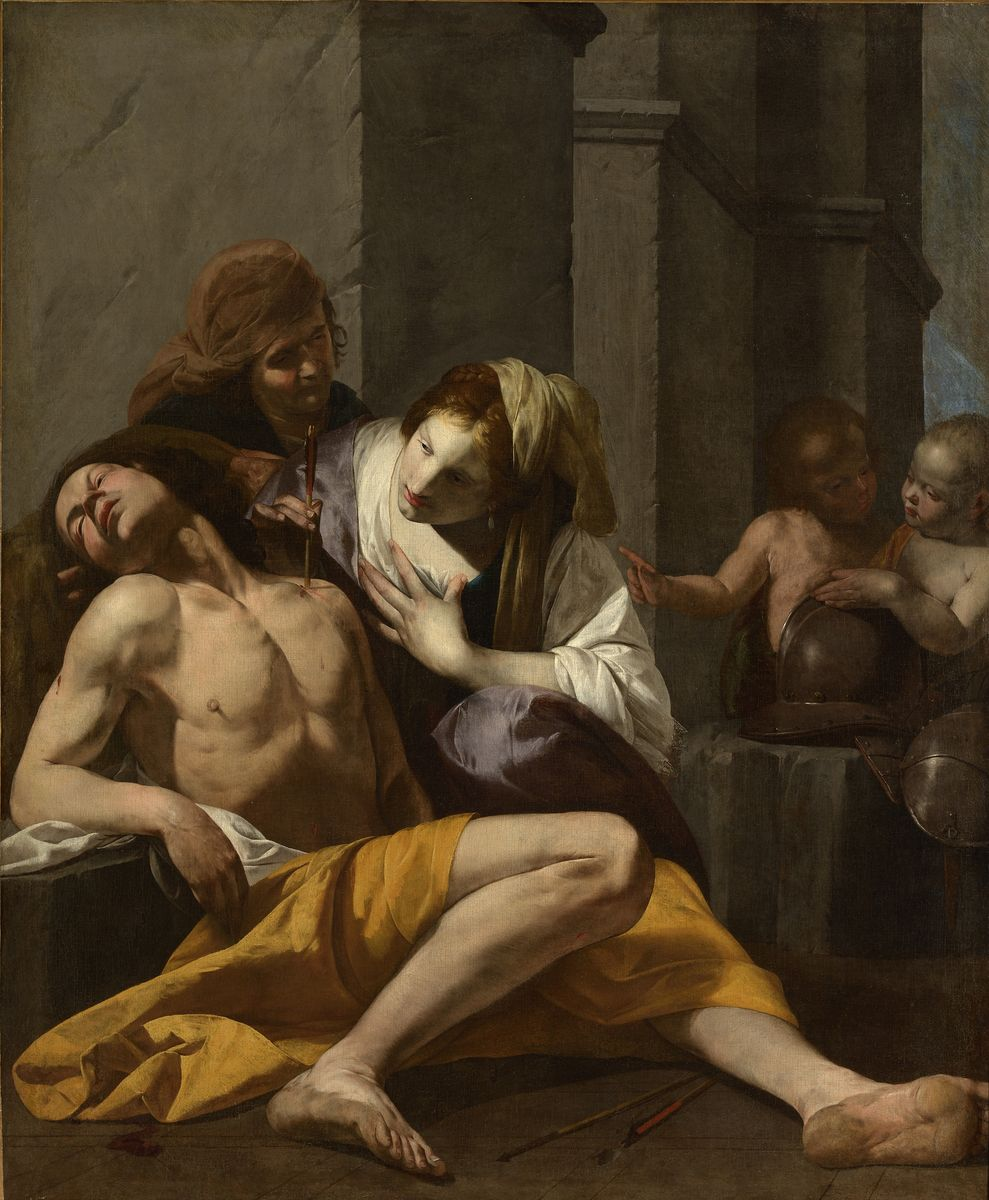
- St. Sebastian Tended by St. Irene, Paris, Gallerie Joseph Hahn
- Born: c. 1616; Naples, Kingdom of Naples
- Died: c. 1656; Naples, Kingdom of Naples
- Education: Massimo Stanzione
- Known for: Painting
- Movement: Baroque

Antonio de Bellis (c. 1616 – c. 1656) was an Italian painter from Naples, active in the Baroque period. Along with Jusepe de Ribera, Bernardo Cavallino and Massimo Stanzione he was one of the major artists working in Naples in the first half of the seventeenth century, under the influence of the painter Caravaggio.

== Life and work ==
Little is known about de Bellis' life. According to Bernardo de' Dominici he was one of the best pupils of Massimo Stanzione. De Bellis' first documented works are four paintings on the Life of St. Charles in the church of San Carlo alle Mortelle, Naples. The paintings are: St. Charles Borromeo Giving Communion to Victims of the Plague, St. Charles Borromeo Visiting the Sick, St. Charles Borromeo Entrusting Canon Cesare Speciano with the Gold from his Neopolitan Estates to Feed the Hungry and the Miracle of the Possessed Woman. These paintings, although early works, are considered most strongly representative. Stylistically indebted both to Ribera and to the Master of the Annunciation to the Shepherds, they are notable for the quality of the drawing, the dynamic opposition between lights and darks, an absence of sentimentality and an acute observation of humanity.

Other pictures in the cycle were either not completed by de Bellis or were repainted or executed by another, unidentified painter. In later works de Bellis' vigorous naturalism and his persistent references to Ribera were augmented with elements derived from other styles currently popular in Naples. The intensity of Velázquez, for example, is evident in the Martyrdom of St. Lawrence (early 1640s; Naples, priv. col.), the refined formal elegance of Stanzione is suggested in St. Sebastian Tended by St. Irene (Paris, Gallerie Joseph Hahn), dating from just before 1645, while the more exquisite finish and composition of the Sacrifice of Noah (1645–50; Museum of Fine Arts, Houston) recalls Bernardo Cavallino’s work of the same period.

De Bellis may have left Naples temporarily in the mid-1650s. Two paintings stylistically belonging to his late oeuvre and inscribed with his monogram ADB are located in Dubrovnik: the Holy Family (c. 1657; Island of Lopud, near Dubrovnik, Madonna of Sunja) and the Virgin in Glory with St. Blaise and St. Francis (c. 1657–8; Dubrovnik, Dominican Monastery). It is probable that he then returned to Naples and was active into the last years of the decade.

Other autograph works by de Bellis are the Finding of Moses in the National Gallery, London and The Liberation of St. Peter in the Smith College Museum of Art. There are two other works known that are signed with the artist's monogram ADB, one in a private collection and the other is Rest on the Flight into Egypt at Whitfield Fine Art, London.

== Gallery ==
Antonio de Bellis

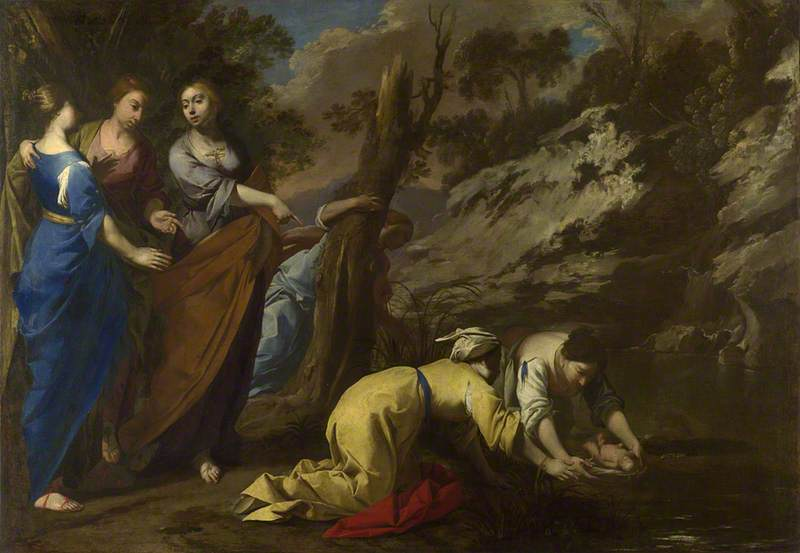
The Finding of Moses, National Gallery, London

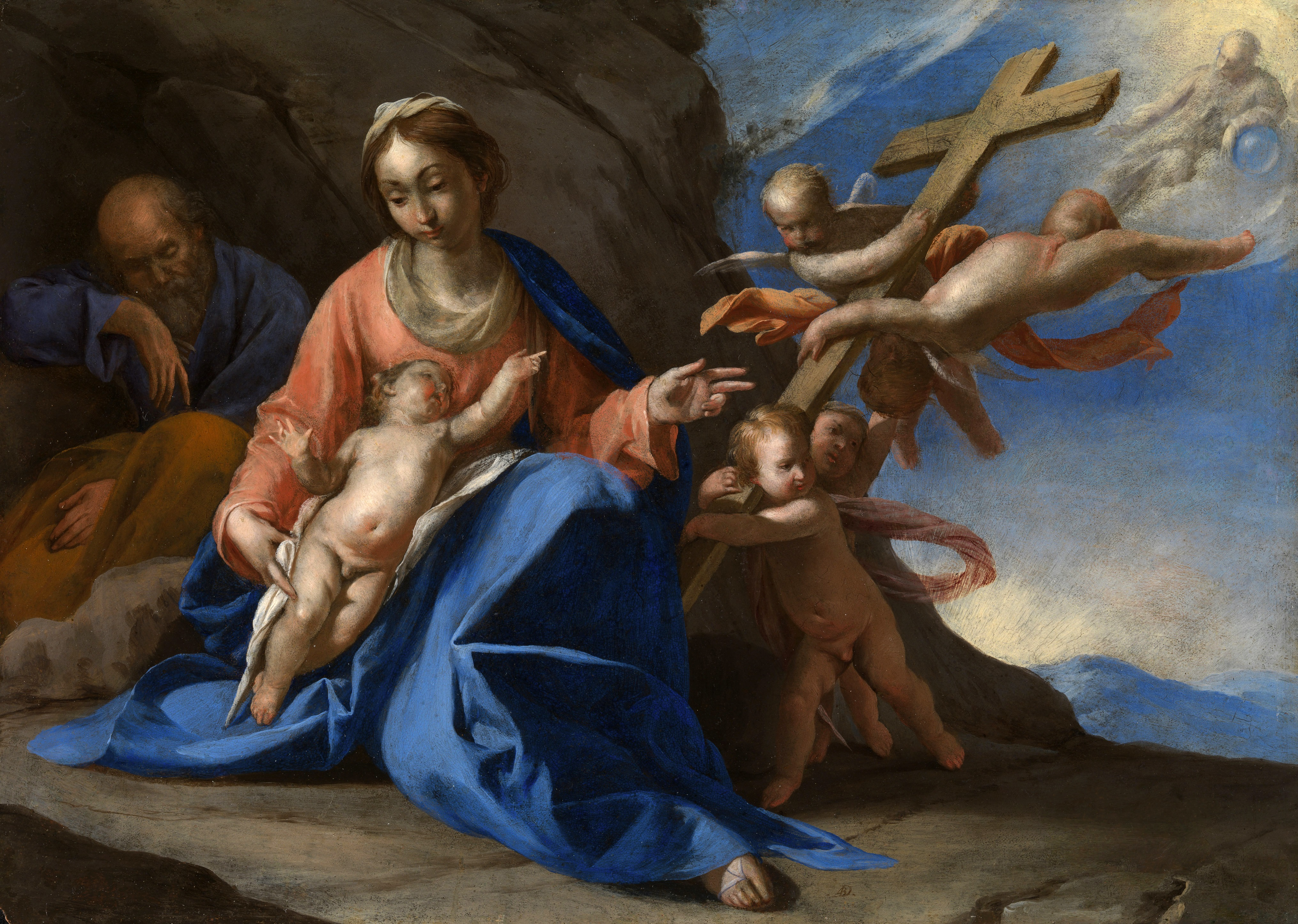
Rest on the Flight into Egypt, priv. col.

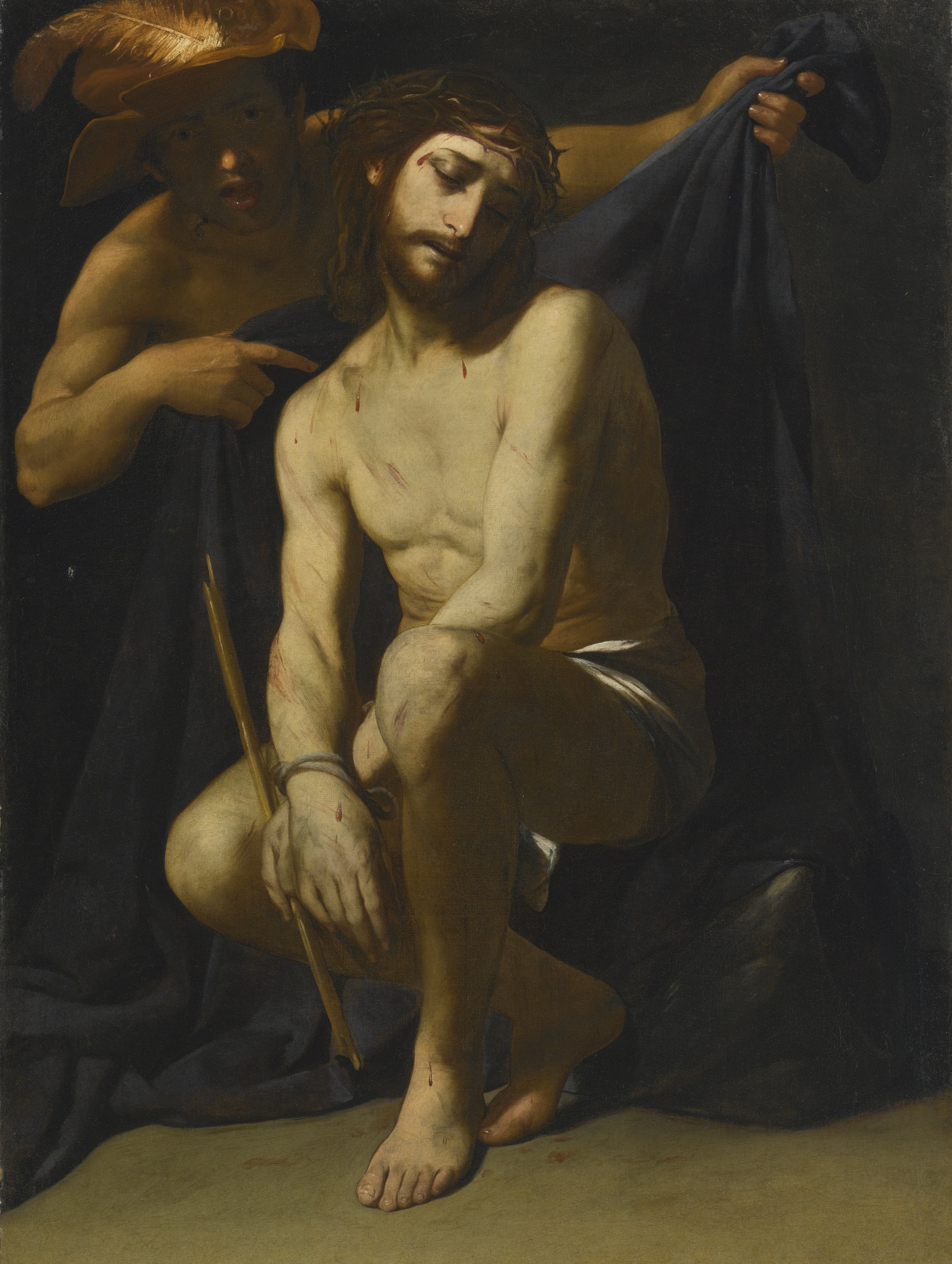
The Mocking of Christ, priv. col.

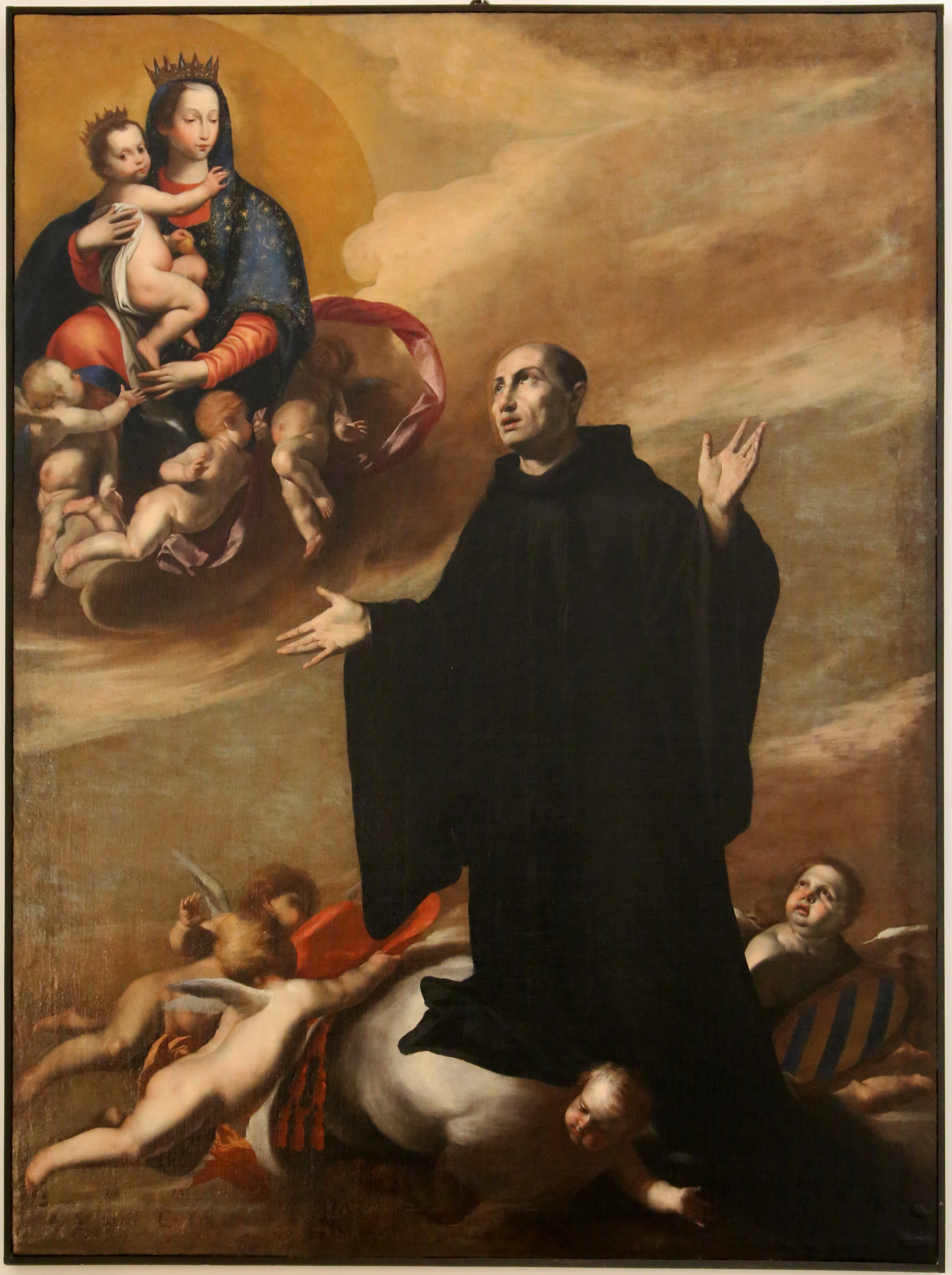
Saint Oderisio in Glory before the Madonna of Purity, Castel Sant'Elmo, Naples

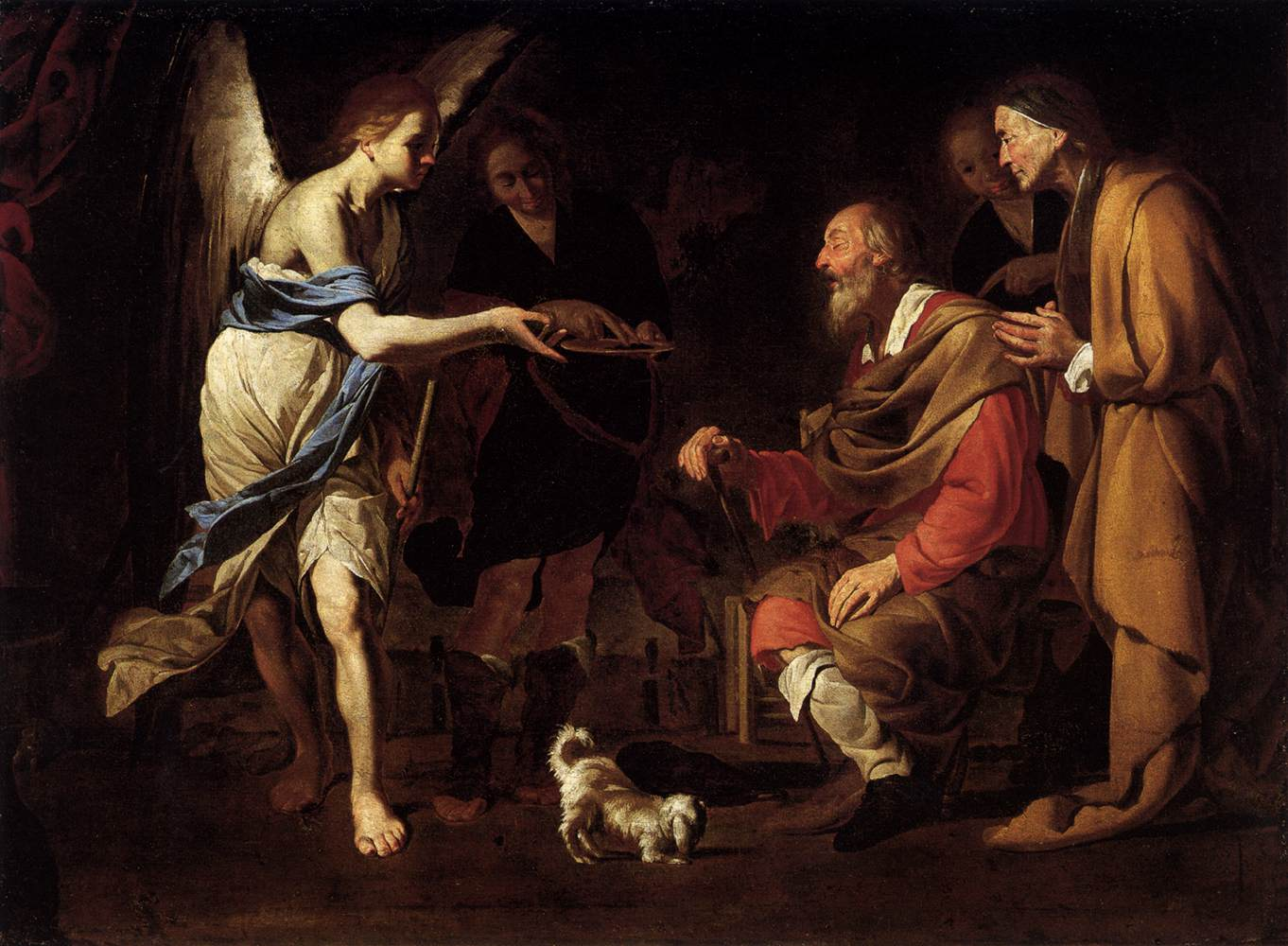
The Healing of Tobit by Tobias, Museo del Prado, Madrid

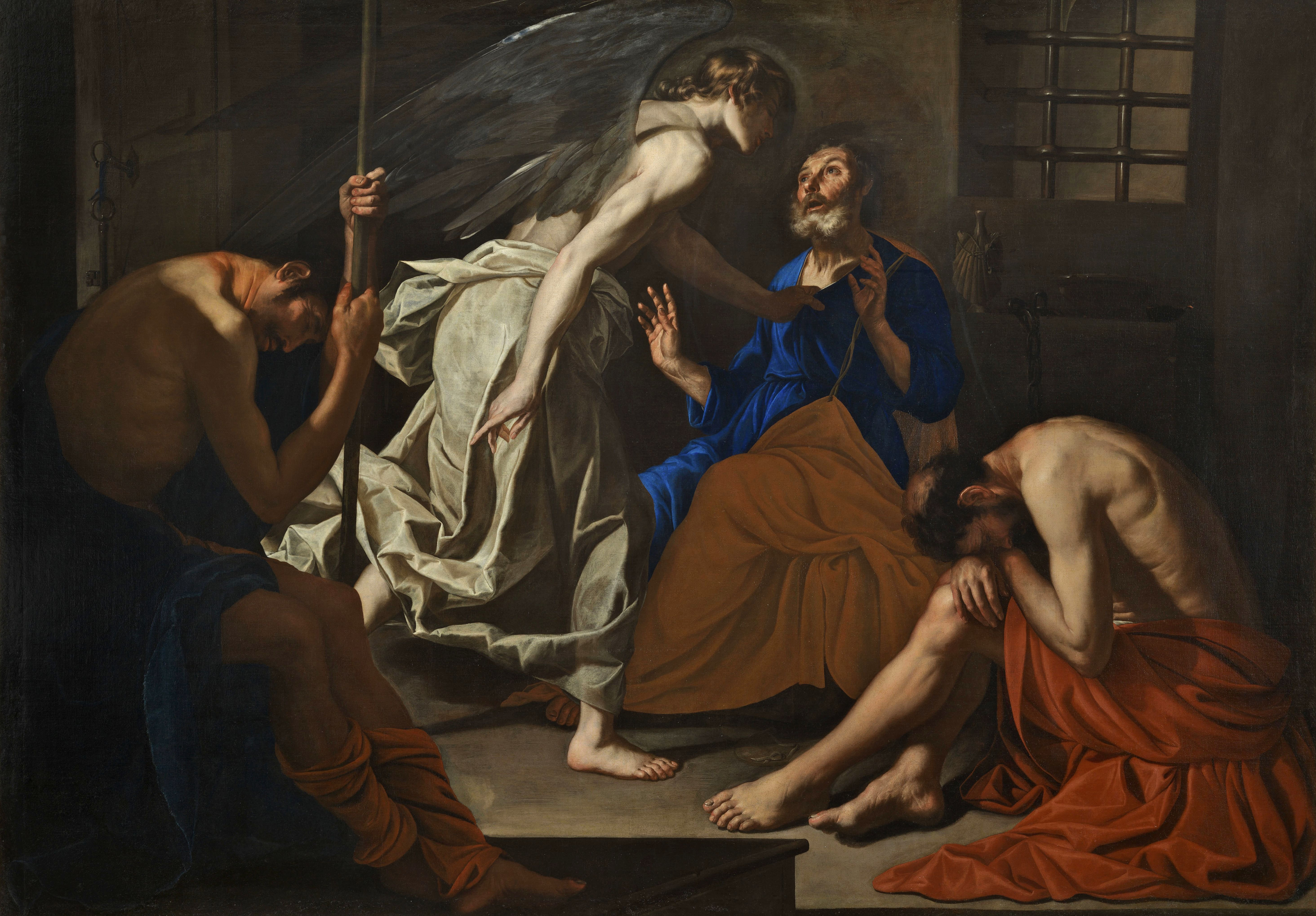
The Liberation of St. Peter, Smith College Museum of Art, Northampton, Massachusetts

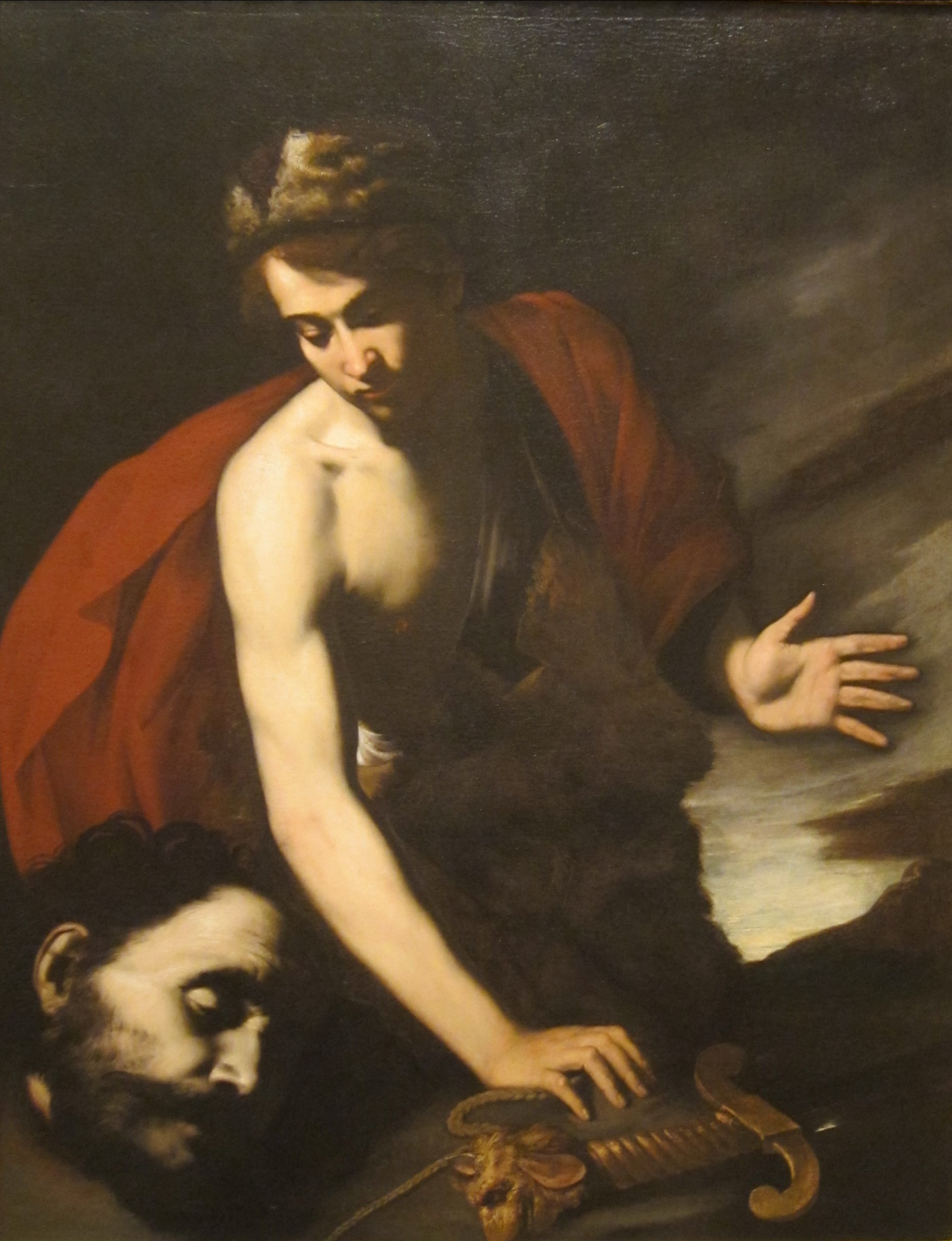
David with the Head of Goliath, San Diego Museum of Art

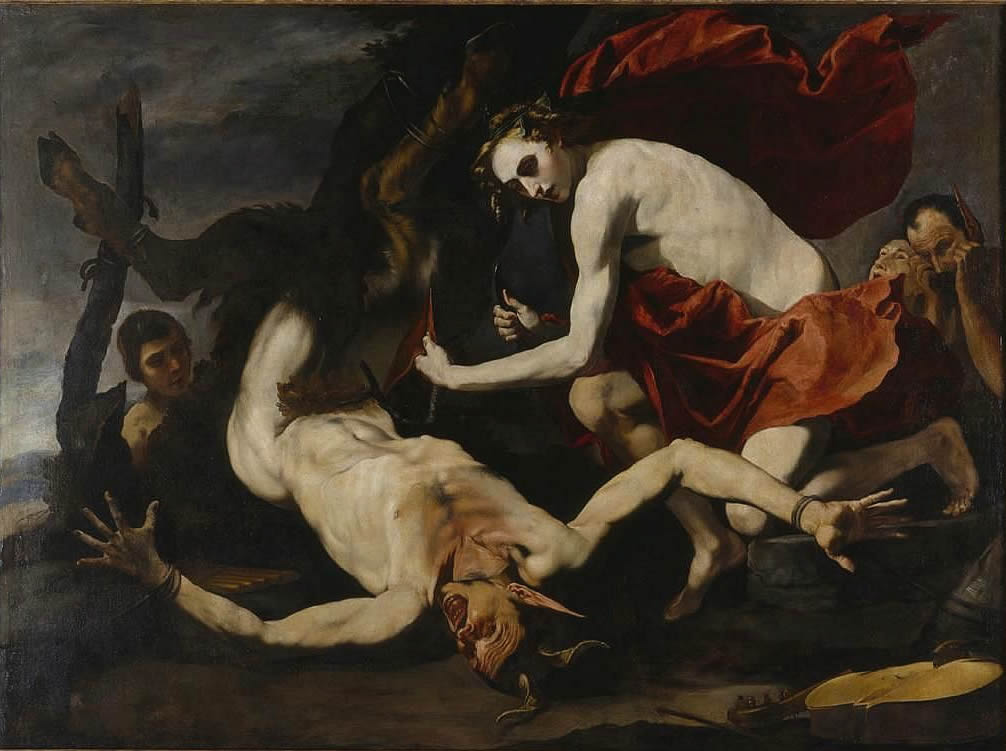
The Flaying of Marsyas, Ringling Museum of Art, Sarasota

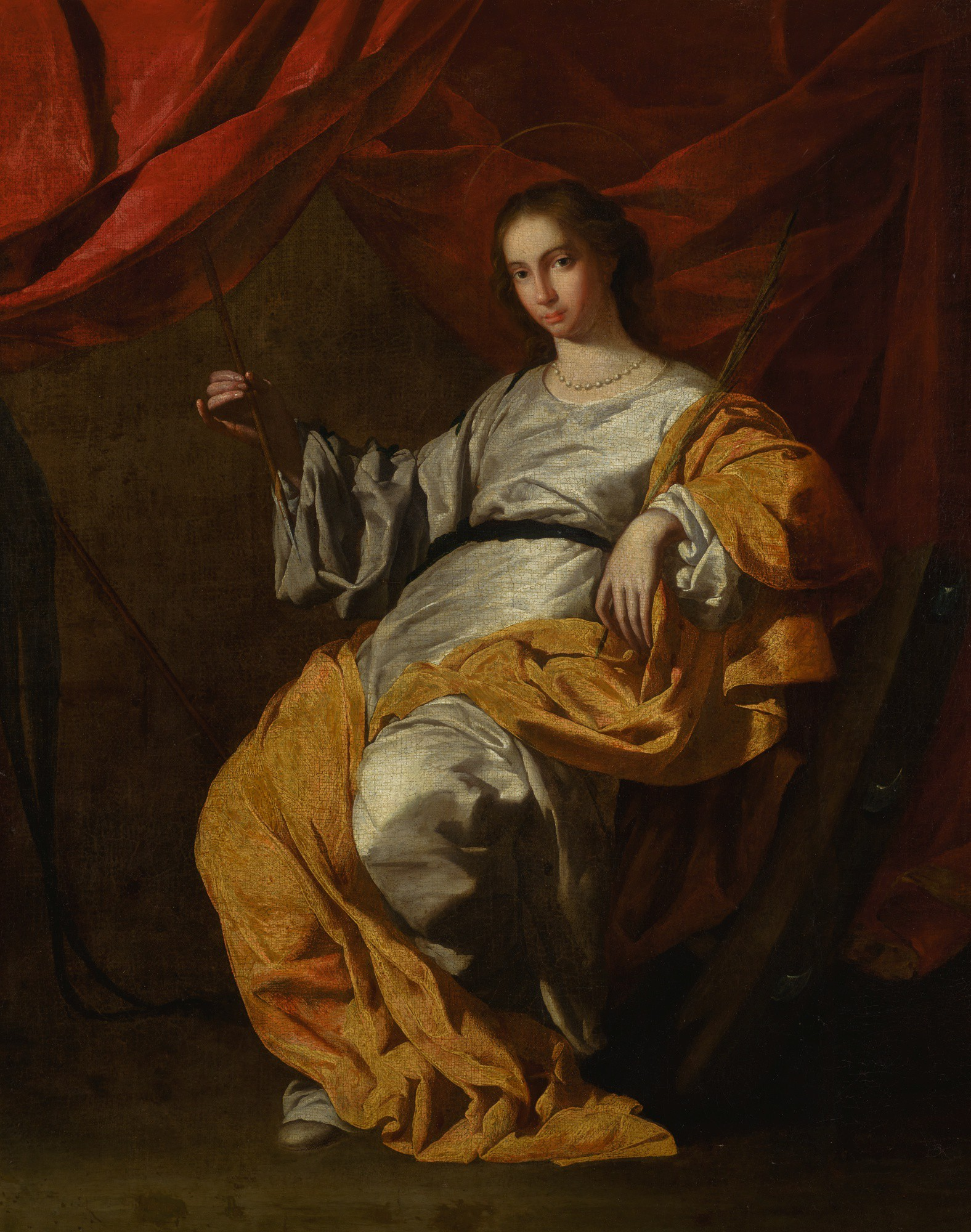
Saint Catherine of Alexandria, priv. col.

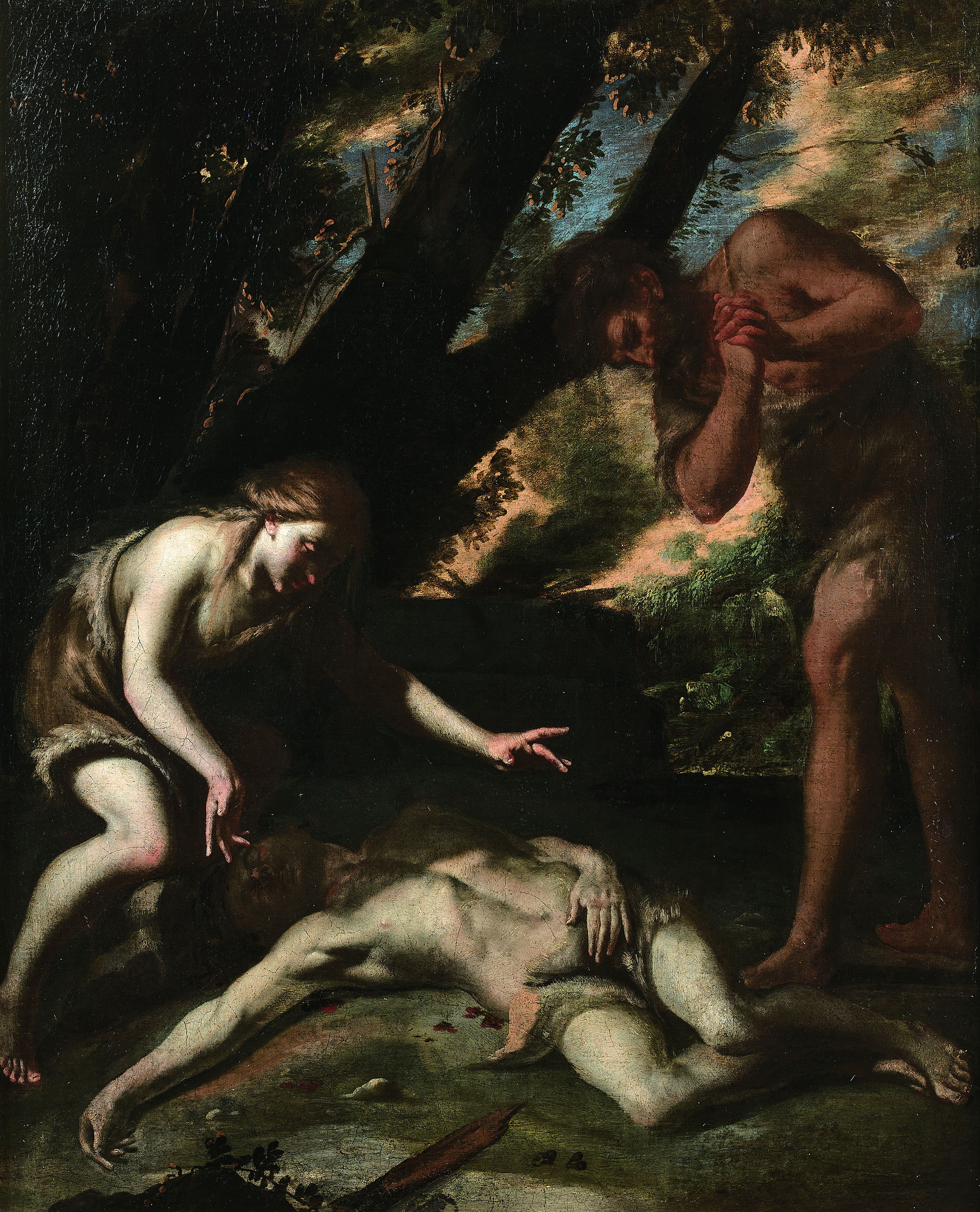
The death of Abel, priv. col.

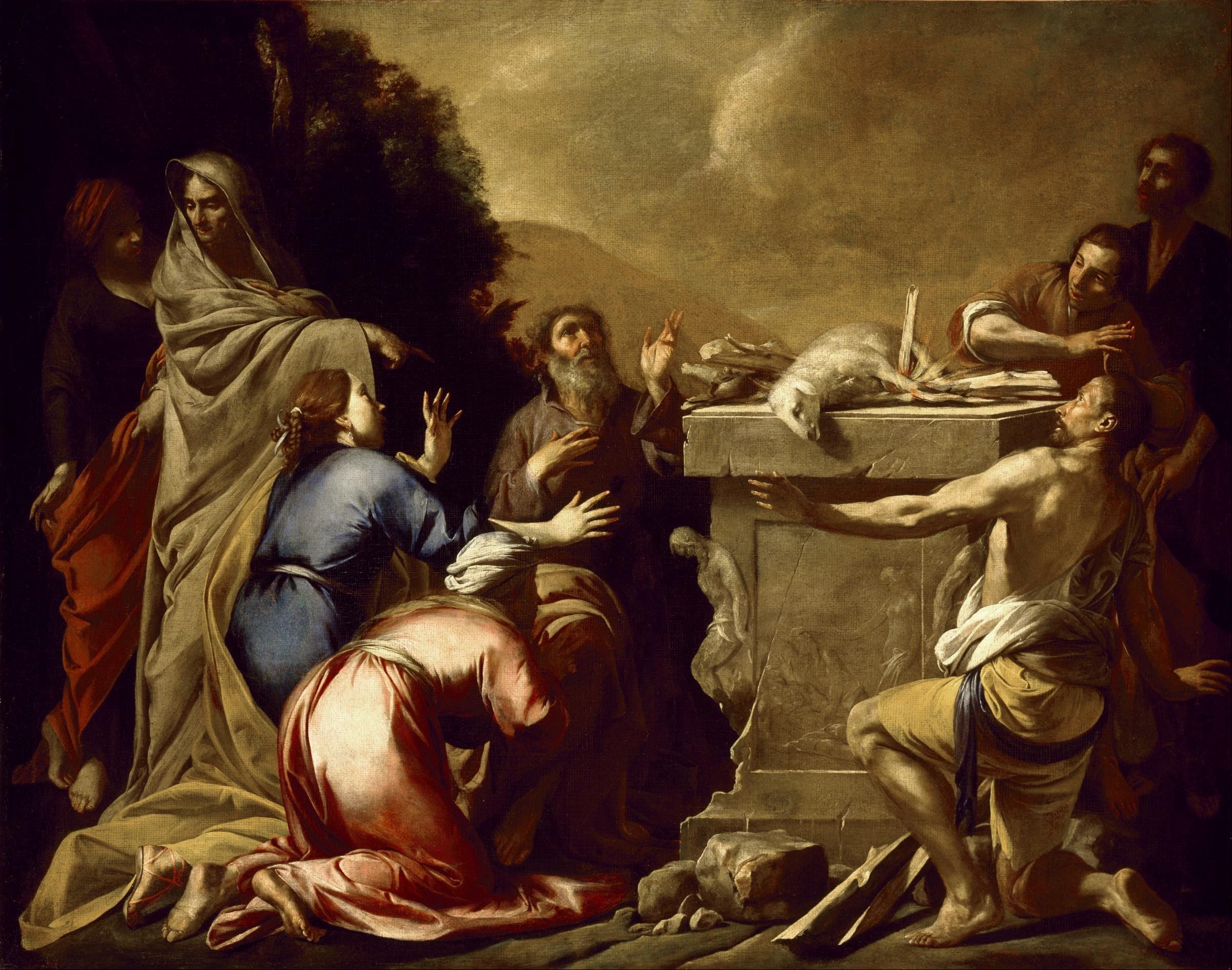
The Sacrifice of Noah, Museum of Fine Arts, Houston

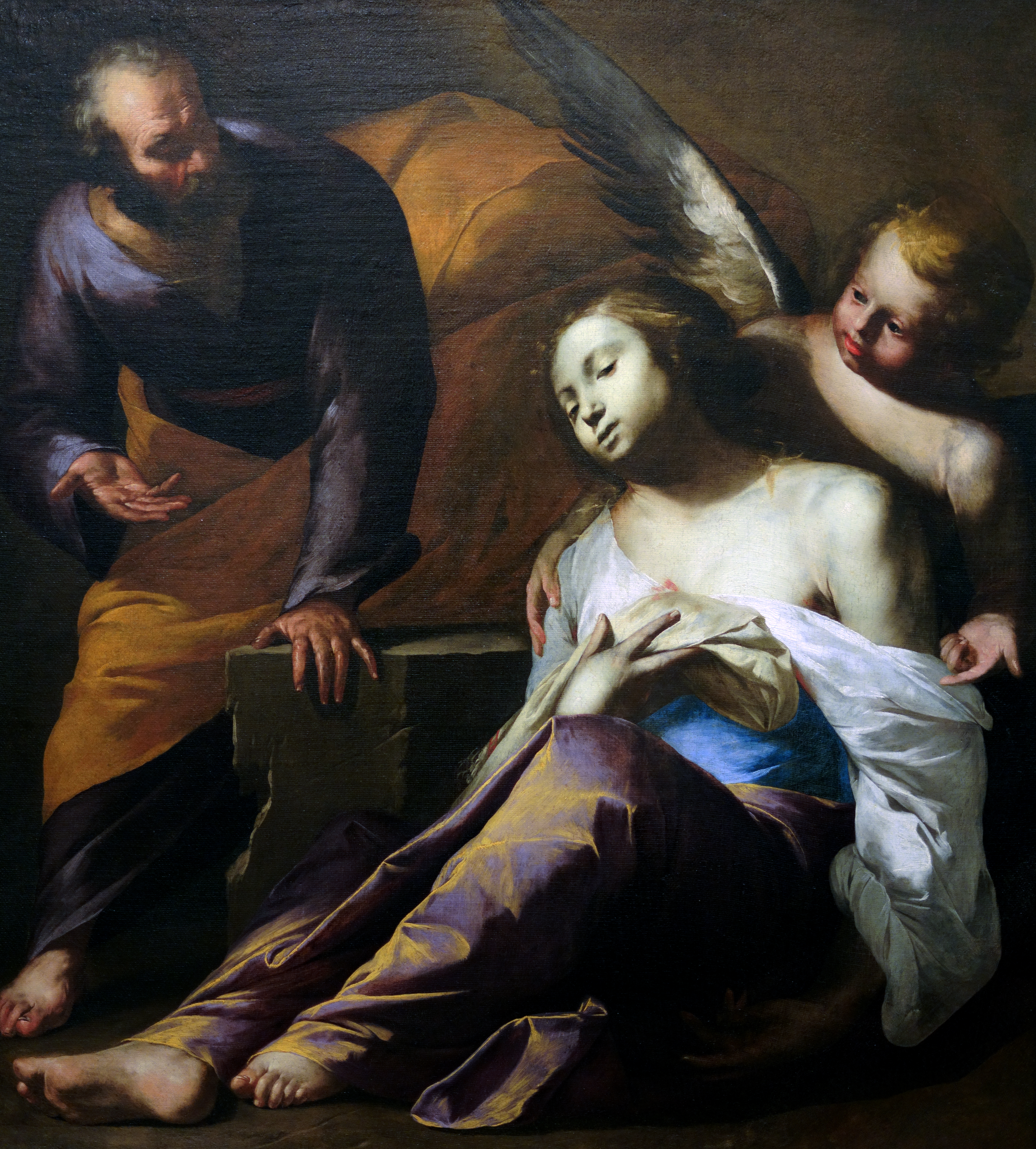
Saint Agatha visited in prison by Saint Peter, Museo di Capodimonte, Naples
