= Æneas and His Father Fleeing Troy =

Painting by Simon Vouet

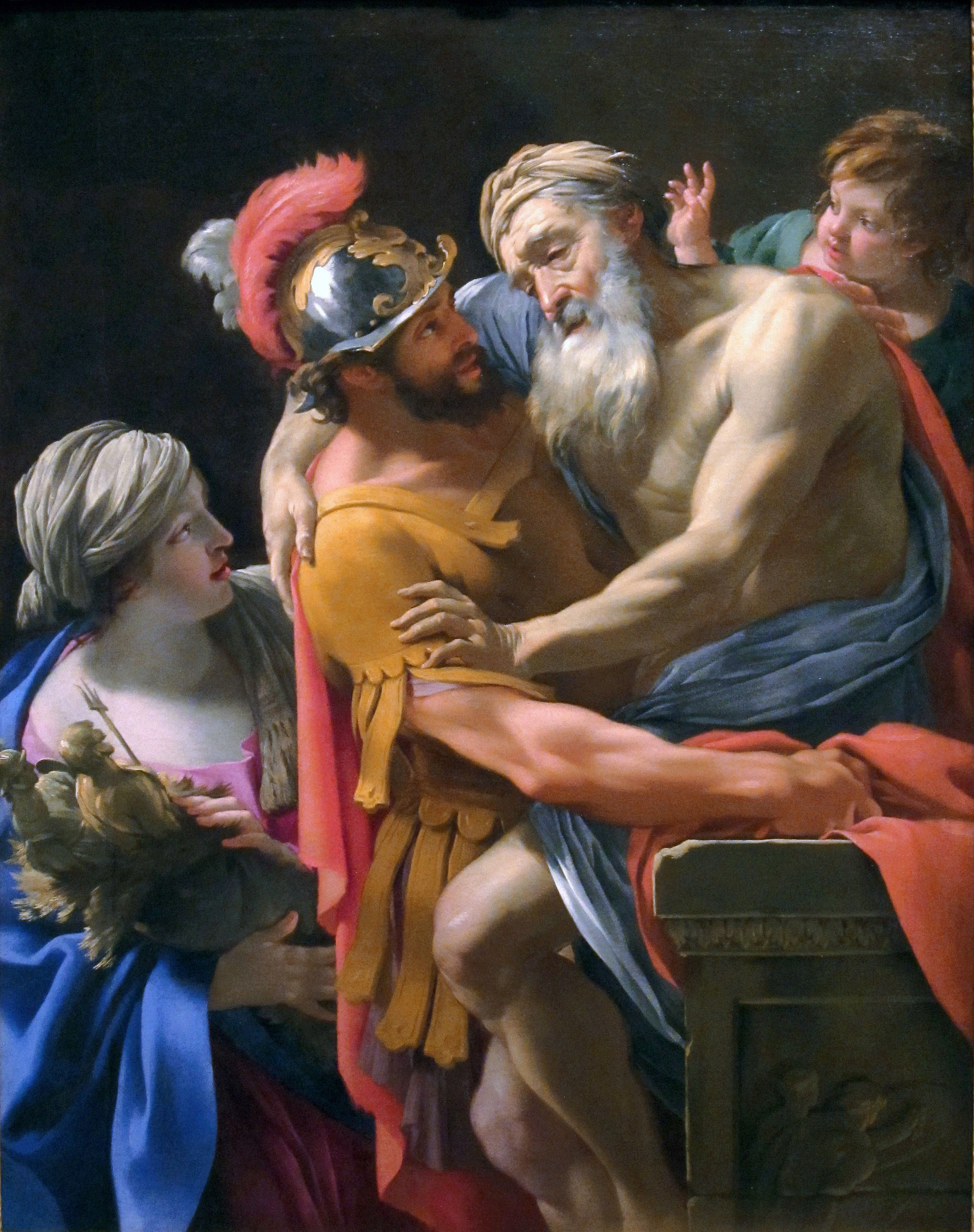
- Artist: Simon Vouet
- Location: San Diego Museum of Art, San Diego, California

Æneas and His Father Fleeing Troy is a painting of c. 1635 by the French artist Simon Vouet. It is part of the collection of the San Diego Museum of Art.
