= The Grand Canal with the Rialto Bridge from the South =

Painting by Francesco Guardi

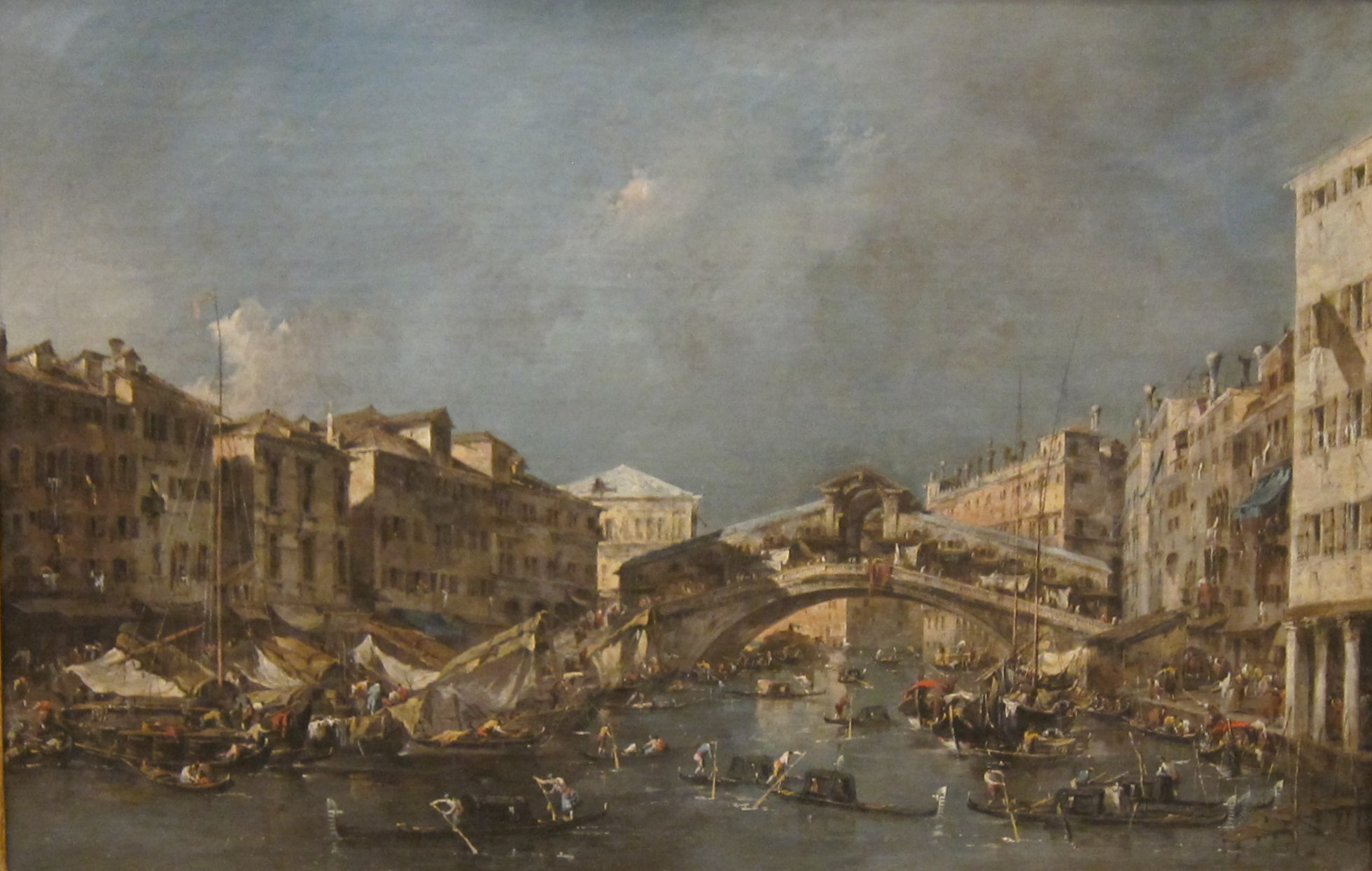
- Artist: Francesco Guardi
- Year: c. 1775
- Dimensions: 54.61 cm × 85.08 cm (21.50 in × 33.50 in)
- Location: San Diego Museum of Art, San Diego

The Grand Canal with the Rialto Bridge from the South is an oil-on-canvas painting executed c. 1775 by Italian painter Francesco Guardi. It is one of the many cityscapes that he made from Venice. It is held in the collection of the San Diego Museum of Art.
