= The Vision of Saint Anthony of Padua (Pittoni) =

Painting by Giambattista Pittoni

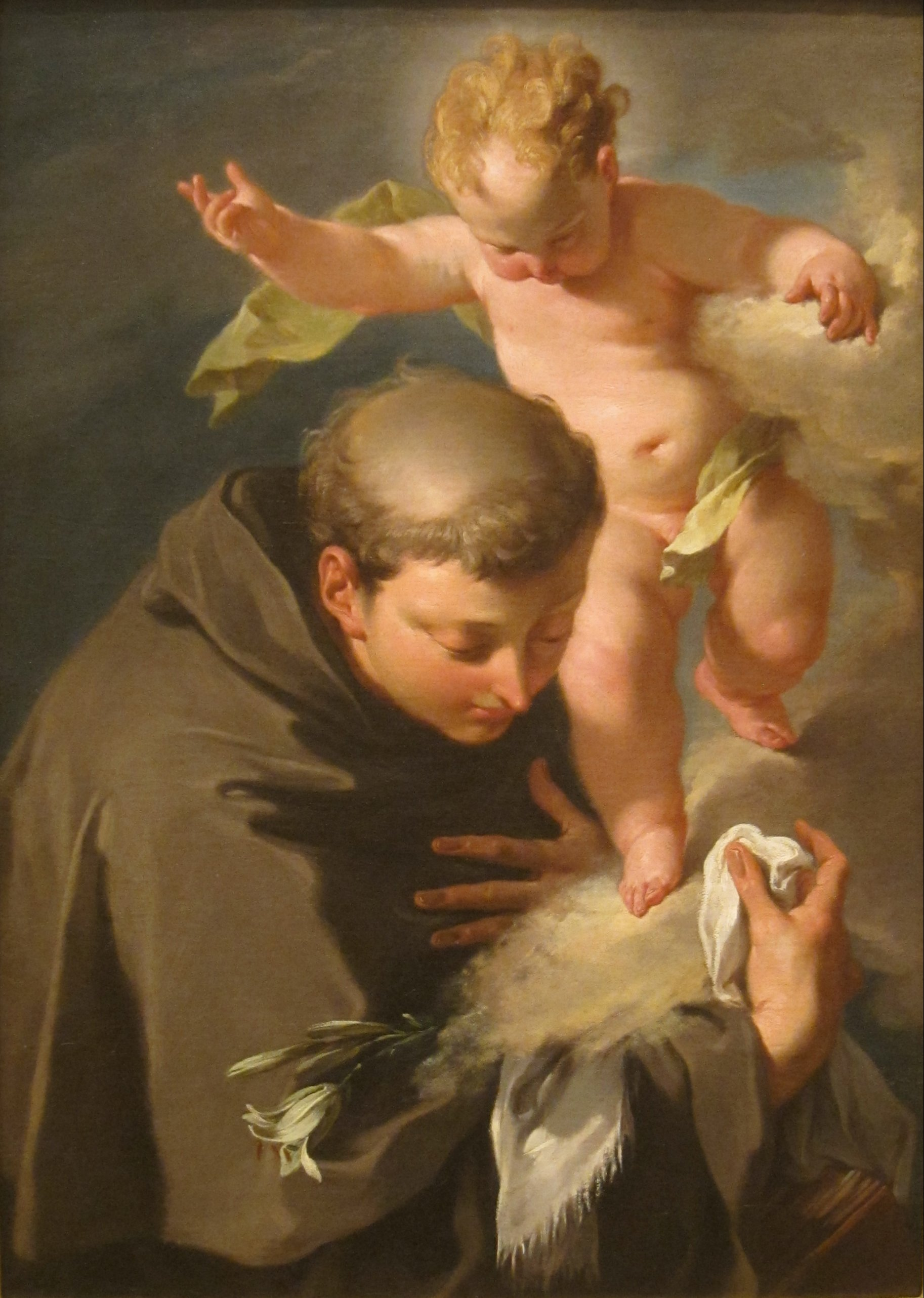
- Artist: Giambattista Pittoni
- Completion date: 1730
- Medium: Oil on canvas
- Dimensions: 90.17 cm (59.06 in)
- Location: San Diego Museum of Art, San Diego

The Vision of Saint Anthony of Padua or Saint Anthony with the Christ Child is an oil on canvas painting by the Italian artist Giambattista Pittoni, completed in August 1730 in Venice. It is now in the San Diego Museum of Art in California, which acquired it in 1948.

It was displayed in the exhibition 'The Allure of La Serenissima: Eighteenth-Century Venetian Art' (9/9/2010 - 1/2/2011).
