= Maria at La Granja =

Painting by Joaquín Sorolla

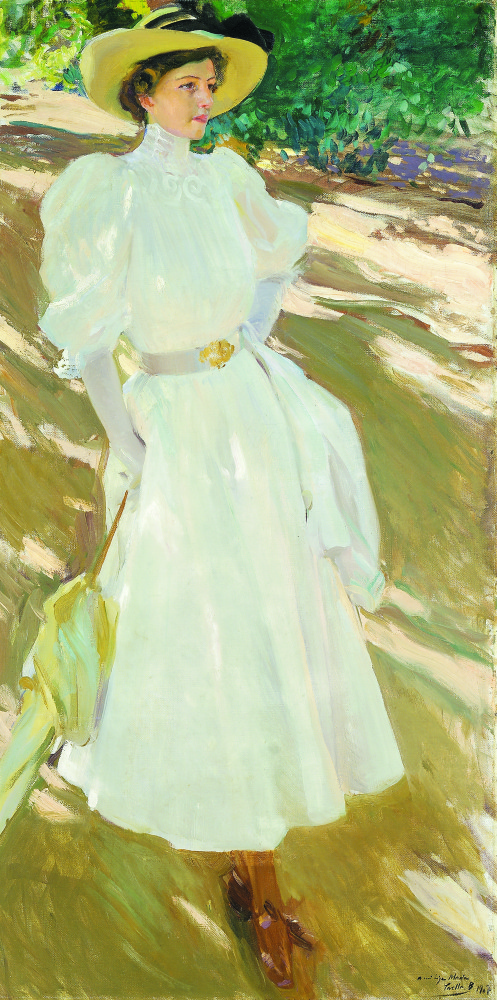
- Artist: Joaquín Sorolla
- Year: 1907
- Medium: oil on canvas
- Dimensions: 170.5 cm × 85.1 cm (67.1 in × 33.5 in)
- Location: San Diego Museum of Art, San Diego

Maria at La Granja is an oil painting on canvas created in 1907 by the Spanish artist Joaquín Sorolla. The painting is part of the collection at the San Diego Museum of Art, which acquired it in 1926.
