= David with the Head of Goliath (Massimo Stanzione) =

Painting by Massimo Stanzione

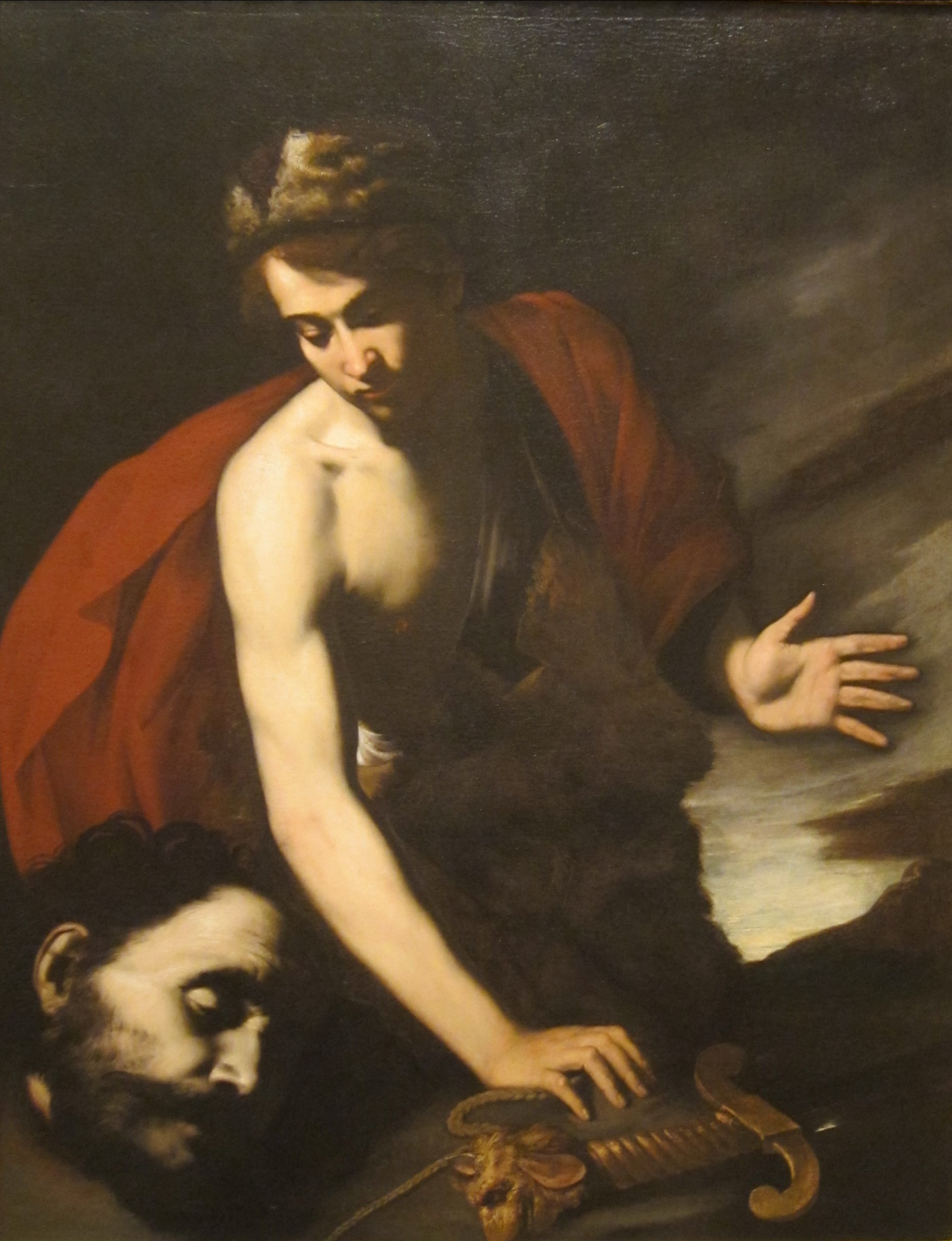
- Artist: Massimo Stanzione
- Year: c. 1642–1643
- Medium: oil on canvas
- Dimensions: 128.27 cm × 97.79 cm (50.50 in × 38.50 in)
- Location: San Diego Museum of Art, San Diego

David with the Head of Goliath is a painting by Italian Baroque artist Massimo Stanzione, created c. 1642–1643. It is now in the San Diego Museum of Art.

== History ==
Caravaggio was an important influence in Stanzione’s artistic style and this painting illustrates a combination of styles from Caravaggio’s brutally realistic elements and dramatic lighting to classical 17th-century artistic trends including the lyrical style of Bologna artists. This painting shows David in an elegant posture, which softens the goriness, i.e. the severed head of Goliath. The theatrical lighting of this painting is a perfect demonstration of the chiaroscuro interpretation by Stanzione. Guido Reni and Caravaggio can be credited for Stanzione’s interpretation of chiaroscuro; they were supposedly his teachers.

It was only after the painting was donated, that experts noticed under gallery lighting some aberrations in the canvas such as unevenness and crackle patterns. Those aberrations, along with the fact that young David appears to be gazing at something in the lower left corner led to suspicions that the canvas had been altered. By 1999, with the use of x-rays and careful removal of surface paint, the original paint of Goliath’s forehead was revealed. After intensive restoration, Goliath’s full face was uncovered and the painting restored to its original form. The full painting depicts Goliath's severed head in the lower left corner, with David, knife in hand, gazing down to the lower left corner. It is believed that the head of Goliath was painted over in order to make the painting less gory and more appealing to potential buyers.

== Provenance ==
In 1947, Mrs. Harry Turpin gifted a Stanzione original painting titled David With the Head of Goliath to the Fine Arts Gallery of San Diego (now the San Diego Museum of Art); the work was then attributed to Ribera, but was reattributed to Stanzione by Mario Modestini in 1951, an attribution confirmed by Schleier, Felton, Zeri, and Spinosa.
