= Luini =

Luini is an Italian surname. Notable people with the surname include:

- Aurelio Luini (c. 1530–1593), Italian painter and draughtsman
- Bernardino Luini (c. 1480/82–1532), Italian painter
- Elia Luini (born 1979), Italian rower
- Giulio Cesare Luini (1512–after 1565), Italian painter
- Rosa Luini (born 1989), know as Rose Villain, Italian singer-songwriter and rapper
- Sergio Luini (born 1972), Italian Olympic gymnast
- Sofía Luini (born 1992), Argentine tennis player

== See also ==
- Tommaso Donini (also Luini, 1601–1637), Italian painter
