= List of works by Giambattista Pittoni =

The catalogue raisonné by Franca Zava Boccazzi of the paintings of Giambattista Pittoni lists 247 extant and 117 lost, missing or destroyed works. The catalogue raisonné by Alice Binion of his drawings includes 304 items. Some of his works are listed below.

== Paintings ==
- In the Louvre Museum, Paris:
  - Christ grants Keys of Paradise to St Peter
  - Continence of Scipio (1733–1735)
  - Susanna and the Elders (1723–1725)
  - Allegorical Tomb of Archbishop John Tillotson (1630–1694) (1726–1727)
  - Bacchus and Ariadne (1720–1725)
  - Mars and Venus (1720–1725)
  - Sacrifice of Polyxena at the Tomb of Achilles
  - Dido founds Carthage
- Holy family, Metropolitan Museum of Art, New York
- Hagar in Desert, Church of Frari, Venice; Oil on Canvas
- Justice and Peace, Ca' Pesaro, Venice; fresco
- The Nativity with God the Father and the Holy Ghost (1740), National Gallery, London
- Susanna and the Elders (1720), Metropolitan Museum of Art, New York City
- St Elizabeth distributing Alms (1734), Szépmûvészeti Múzeum, Budapest; Oil on canvas, 72 x 43 cm
- The family (1740), private collection
- Sacrifice of Isaac (1720), Church of San Francesco della Vigna, Venice; Oil on Canvas, 118 x 155 cm
- Descent from the Cross (c. 1750), Palace of Legion of Honor, San Francisco, California
- Sacrifice of Polyxena (1733–1734), Getty Museum, Los Angeles
- Christ and St Peter, Ashmolean Museum, Oxford
- Annunciation (1758), Accademia, Venice
- Death of Joseph, Berggruen Museum in Charlottenburg Palace, National Gallery (Berlin), Berlin; Oil on canvas, 97 x 79 cm
- St Jerome and St Peter of Alcantara (1725), National Gallery of Scotland, Edinburgh; Oil on canvas, 275 x 143 cm
- Penitent Magdalene (1740) Accademia, Venice, Oil on canvas, 48 x 38 cm
- Sacrifice of Polyxena, Hermitage Museum, St Petersburg; Oil on canvas, 129 x 94 cm
- Vision of St Anthony of Padua (1730), San Diego Museum of Art, Balboa Park, California; 35 1/2 in. x 23 1/4 in.
- David and Bathsheba, 74x64 cm
- Finding of Moses (c. 1730), Portland Art Museum, Oregon
- Miracle of the loaves and fishes (1725), National Gallery of Victoria, Melbourne; oil on canvas, 120.1x178.5 cm
- Martyrdom of St Thomas, Church of San Stae, Venice
- The Death of Sophonisba, Pushkin Museum, Moscow; oil on canvas, 165 x 214 cm
- The Emperor Honorius Making Constantius His Co-Ruler, Pushkin Museum, Moscow; oil on canvas
- Rest on the Flight into Egypt (1725), Thyssen-Bornemisza Museum, Madrid; oil on canvas, 108 x 135 cm
- St Roch (1727), Szépmûvészeti Múzeum, Budapest; oil on canvas, 42 x 32 cm
- Allegorical monument to the glory of Isaac Newton (c. 1727–29), Fitzwilliam Museum, Cambridge
- Nativity, Musée des Beaux-Arts, Quimper; oil on canvas, 74 × 56 cm
- Stoning of St Stephen, 2nd left picture of the Church's altar of S. Maria Diessen
- Death of Agripina and Death of Seneca, Dresden Gallery
- Eliezer and Rebecca (c. 1725), Musée des Beaux-arts, Bordeaux
- Enthroned Madonna and Child venerated by Saints Peter and Pius V (1723–1724), Church of Santa Corona, Vicenza
- Madonna with Saints, Church of San Germano dei Berici
- Diane and Acteon (c. 1725), Palazzo Chiericati, Vicenza; oil on canvas, 147 x 197.5 cm
- Sacrifice by Jephthah, Museo di Palazzo Reale, Genoa
- Portrait of Cardinal Bartolomeo Roverella, Accademia dei Concordi, Rovigo
- Jupiter protect Justice, The Peace and the Science, Plafonds decoration, Ca' Pesaro, Venice
- Saints presenting a devout Woman to Virgin and Child, Cleveland Museum of Art
- Allegory of Painting and Sculpture, Gallerie dell'Accademia, Venice
- Annunciation, Städelsches Kunstinstitut
- Madonna of Sorrows, Museum Gemäldegalerie (Stiftung Preußischer Kulturbesitz)
- Martyrdom of St Clement: Sketch for Altar at Clemenskirche, Muenster, displayed at Uppsala Universitet Konstsamling
- St Peter, Kunsthalle
- Virgin and Child with Saints, Prado Museum, Madrid. Oil on canvas 36 x 32 cm
- Triumphal Entry of Alexander into Babylonia, 1735, Patrimonio Nacional, Spain.
