= Federico Bencovich =

Croatian-Italian painter (1677–1753)

- Federiko Benković
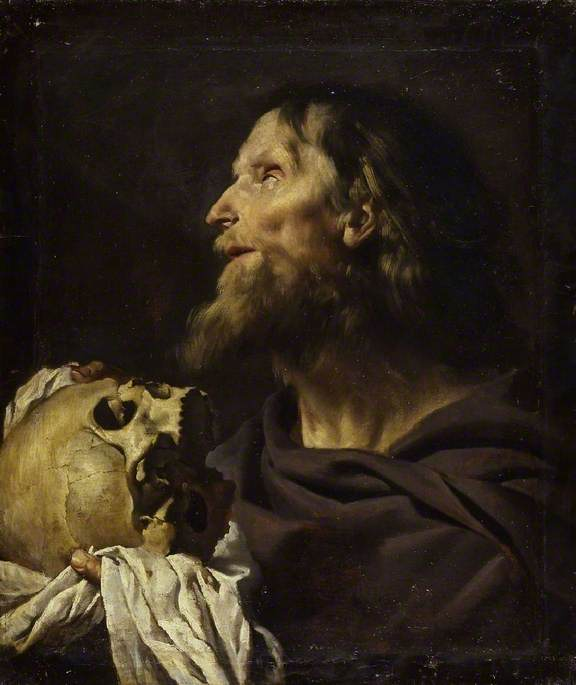
- "Hermit", oil on canvas, Fitzwilliam Museum, Cambridge
- Born: Federiko Benković; 1677; Dalmatia, Republic of Venice
- Died: 8 July 1753 (75–76); Gorizia, Republic of Venice
- Occupation: Artist
- Movement: Roccoco

Federico Bencovich (Croatian: Federiko Benković; 1677 – 8 July 1753), also known as Federighetto or Ferighetto Dalmatino among others, was a Croatian-Italian late Baroque painter from Venetian Dalmatia. Although was among prominent painters of his era in North Italy, Germany and Austria, being a link between Venetian and Austrian Baroque, Bencovich's art was mostly rediscovered and valued only since the early 20th century.

== Origin ==
Federico Bencovich (as he signed his own name) was born in 1677, but his exact birthplace is unknown, however usually is considered to have been somewhere in Venetian Dalmatia. It was considered as it could have been either in Omiš, Šibenik, the island of Brač, Dubrovnik, Verona or possibly Venice itself. According to information from early catalogs and notes on paintings, he was born in Venice to a Dalmatian father, in Verona (still considered of foreign origin), or Dubrovnik, but considered as a "Schiavone" and "Dalmatino".

Given the information about his surname, and how his artistic heritage was found in 1854 by Ivan Kukuljević Sakcinski at the house of Jerolim Benković in Omiš, today it is considered as most likely that he originated from the island of Brač and the local noble family Bencovich/Benković, who later branched to Omiš, Imotski and other parts of Dalmatia, while unrelated to the noble family of the same name from North Dalmatia which had a different coat of arms. According to the letter dated 24 March 1724 found in Milan, his father's name was Julije, and had a brother Leopold in Split (who was father of later Jerolim from Omiš), whom made his representative of property in Dalmatia.

== Life ==
According to the contemporary French collector Pierre-Jean Mariette's dictionary of artists, Bencovich was invited to study art in Venice by his close cousin and musician Gaetano Bencovich Orsini. Bencovich's initial training was likely in Venice, but later he apprenticed with Carlo Cignani in Bologna, assisting him in 1706 in completing the frescoes of the Assumption of the Virgin on the dome of the Forlì cathedral. His first independent work, Juno on the clouds, was painted in 1705. He also appears to have worked in the studio of Giuseppe Maria Crespi.

In 1710 Bencovich painted the altarpiece of St. Andrew on the cross surrounded by St. Bartholomew, St. Carolus Borromei, St. Lucia, and St. Apollonia for the church of Madonna del Piombo in Bologna, later transferred to the parish church of Senonches near Chartres in France. By 1715, he came to the service of the Archbishop-Elector of Mainz Lothar Franz von Schönborn and was to complete four large canvas masterpieces for the gallery in the Schloss Weißenstein in the town of Pommersfelden: Apollo and Marcia, Hagar and Ishmael in the Desert, Iphigenia's Sacrifice and Abraham's Sacrifice of Isaac. Between 1725 and 1728 returned to Venice to depict Il beato Pietro Gambacorta at the Church of S. Sebastiano. In 1733 was named as court painter of Friedrich Karl von Schönborn, the Prince-Bishopric of Würzburg and Bamberg. There completed Immaculate Conception, Archangel Michael, and Sacrificio di Jefte and Mosè ed Aronne, with the former disappearing, and latter destroyed during the World War II.

However, in his late career after moving from Milan to Vienna, seemingly experienced a crisis and lack of work, spending his last years in Gorizia at the residence of Attems family. After his death he gradually fell into oblivion, and his paintings were attributed to Giovanni Battista Piazzetta or Cignani, amongst others. Abraham's Sacrifice of Isaac is probably the painting that disappeared from the castle of Pommersfelden at the beginning of the 19th century. Until that time, the painting was attributed to Piazzetta.

== Analysis ==
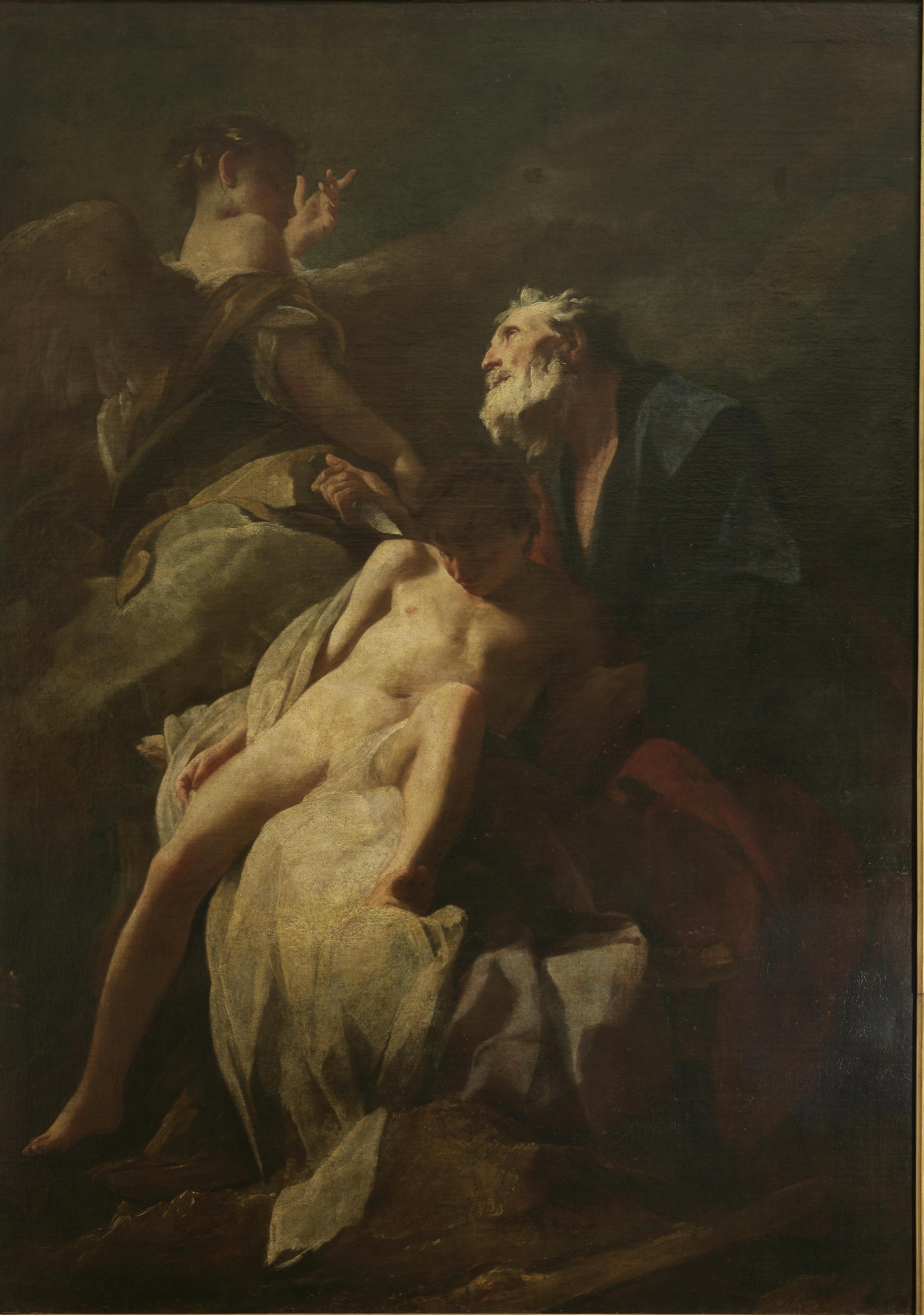
Abraham's Sacrifice of Isaac, 1716., 220,7 × 165,3 cm, Croatian Academy of Sciences and Arts, Zagreb.

The dramatic, often tortured, poses and lighting of his figures are placed within earthy tenebrist backgrounds. He uses Piazzetta's and Sebastiano Ricci's unfinished and ragged brushstrokes, but superimposes a startling mystical imprint that is often foreign to the magisterial and olympian Venetian painting, and more akin to the Baroque painters from Northern Italy, Alessandro Magnasco and Francesco Cairo.

His talent and artwork was recognized, but also controversial in the 18th century. The authors of the epoch agree that Bencovich was a talented artist, had a good school in Bologna and had youthful success, but they disagree about the rest. For example, art historian and collector Marcello Oretti (1786) from Bologna, repeated very critical reception by Venetian Pietro Guarienti (1752) which noted his "new and extravagant way of painting, which dragged him from the good path, which led him to perfection, and gave in a way, which did not please others except him, and made him lose credit, and acquired reputation". Mariette's commentary gives presumption that Guarienti's viewpoint had other motives, stating that he "does not speak very favorably of this painter; from there I prejudge that they were not friends". Venetian Antonio Maria Zanetti (1771) on the other hand stated that "worthy was this painter, others can say what they want", although considered his paintings showed dark figures which don't bring happiness nor popularity (supposedly depicting them in his own "unpleasant" and "melancholic" image), concluded that "if his paintings lack enticements, they are not without a sense of shadow and light, nor without the power and intelligence". Mariette (1717) wrote favorably of Bencovich, but also criticized that in his late career "he was no longer what he had made people hope for. The lack of purpose led him into an abyss, prepared for any painter who neglects this essential part of his art. He became more like a practitioner whose figures, exaggerated and unnatural, displeased".

Bencovich himself was critical of negative reception, complaining from Vienna to his apprentice Rosalba Carriera in a 1733 letter that "I wish all the honor to the Venetian painters, although they are trying to prevent me by slandering me (although it is an honor for me at this distance), in order to remove as unworthy the only works of mine exhibited in public, in the churches of St. Sebastian and St. Maria alla Fava. The world is terribly unfair, and later complains about too much clanking of guns and war".

Saint Andrew among the Saints Bartholomew, Carlo Borromeo, Lucy and Apollonia, (c. 1710-1716), Notre-Dame of Senonches, Senonches

Venetian Giannantonio Moschini (1815) wrote favorably of him and influenced the common opinion of being "responsible for Tiepolo's art's formation", and later much to the Bencovich's recognition was influential the early 20th century research and evaluation by Italian art historian Rodolfo Pallucchini. Italian art historian Roberto Longhi (1946) described the artist as "eccentric and ingenious". In the catalogue The Glory of Venice: Art in the Eighteenth Century (1994, ed. by Jane Martineau and Andrew Robinson) of the exhibition held at the Royal Academy of Arts and National Gallery of Art, is noted Bencovich's early influence on early Tiepolo and Giambattista Pittoni, the common view of being Piazzetta's "alter ego", but with a conclusion of having "an altogether different artistic personality. Bencovich's are not bulky, well-modelled sculptural figures solidly planted on the ground, but nineteen insubstanital phantoms, only two of which can be identified with certainty. And his inclusion of several female figures besides Iphigenia and Artemis shows a disregard for his subject unthinkable in Piazzetta. Bencovich's originality lies elsewhere: in his gift to conjure up, through ghostly surreal light and colours, a sense of impending doom and horror before the slaughter to come".

However, some paintings which were credited to Bencovich, in the late 20th and early 21st century were sometimes re-assigned to Piazzetta (Venere e Marte, Pordenone), Tiepolo (Sacra Famiglia e tre santi francescani, Milan; San Francesco in meditazione, Venezia; Fauno seduto con clava, Milan), Giovanni Battista Crosato (Il miracolo dell'ostia, Pordenone), Josef Ignaz Mildorfer (Socrate incitato ad evadere dal carcere, Sibiu), and Pittoni (San Giuseppe con Gesù Bambino, Udine). In 2010, two then unpublished paintings were attributed to Bencovich, David and Il concerto di due pastorelli.

== Selected works ==
- Brescia, Pinacoteca Tosio Martinengo, Madonna in trono con santi (sketch)
- Berlin, Staatliche Museen, Madonna/Vergine e santi; Maddalena, 1730 – 1735
- Bologna, Pinacoteca Nazionale, Il beato Pietro Gambacorta, engraving, c. 1728
- Borgo San Giacomo, Verolanuova, Brescia, Chiesa del Castello: Deposizione/Cristo deposto adorato da santi, c. 1735
- Crema, Church of the Holy Trinity: Estasi di S. Francesco da Paola, 1724
- Forlì, Palazzo Orselli Foschi, Giunone (Juno)
- Pommersfelden, Weißenstein Castle, Hagar and Ishmael in the desert; The Sacrifice of Iphigenia, c. 1715.
- Senonches, France, parish, Crucifixion of St. Andrew and Saints, c. 1725
- Stuttgart, Staats-Galerie, Adoration of the Magi, c. 1725
- Tomo, Feltre, parish, Fuga in Egitto, c. 1709
- Venice, Church of S. Sebastiano: Il beato Pietro Gambacorta, c. 1726
- Venice, Gallerie dell'Accademia, Autoritratto, c. 1735
- Venice, Museo Correr, Fuga in Egitto, drawings, c. 1720
- Vienna, Albertina: Departing for Egypt, Rest while escaping in Egypt, c. 1745; drawings: St. Francis of Paola; Ecstasy of St. Francis of Assisi; Death of St. Benedict
- Zagreb, Strossmayer Gallery, Sacrifizio d'Isacco, 1720

== Gallery ==
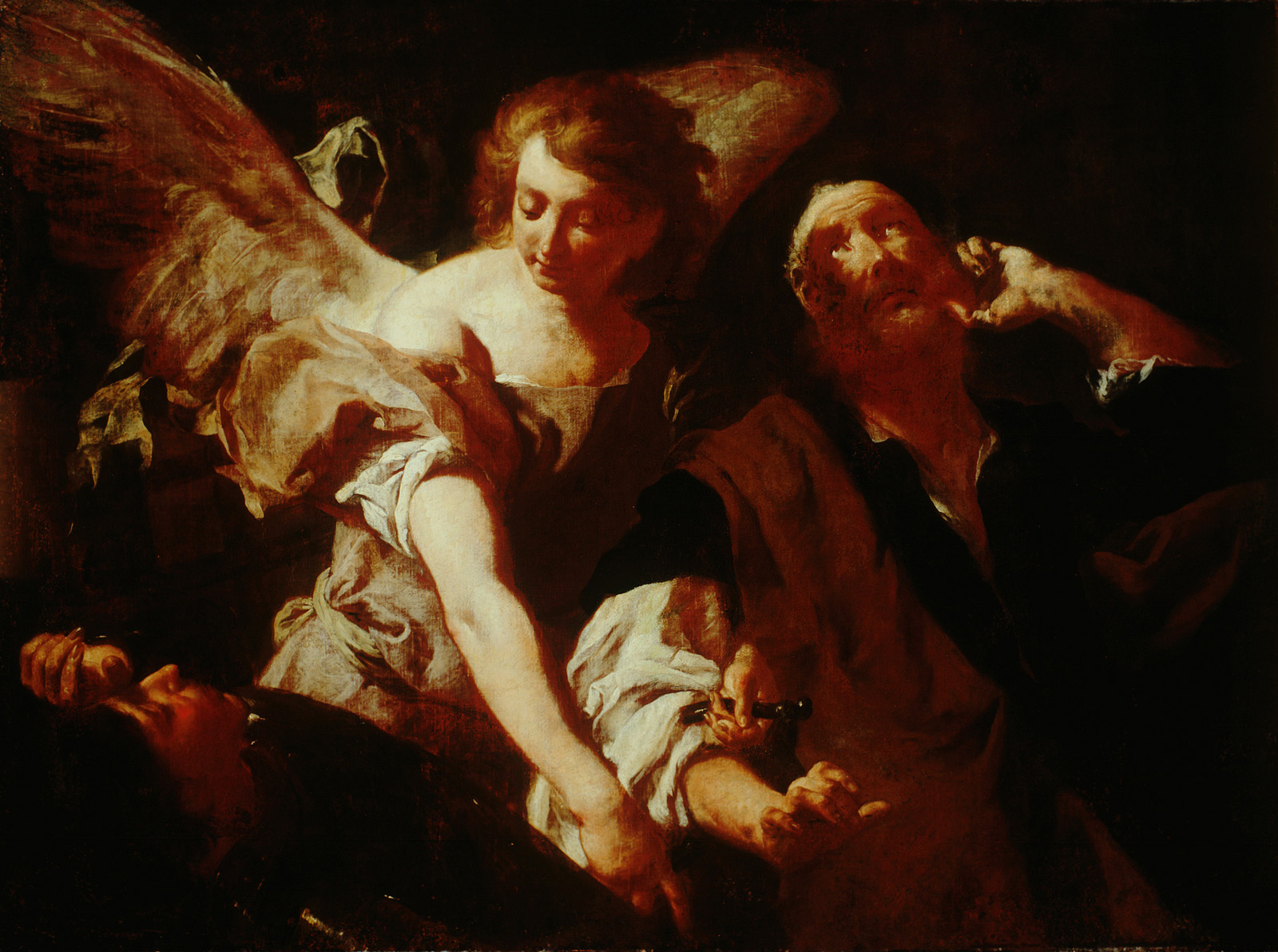
Bencovich's paintings Saving Saint Peter from prison

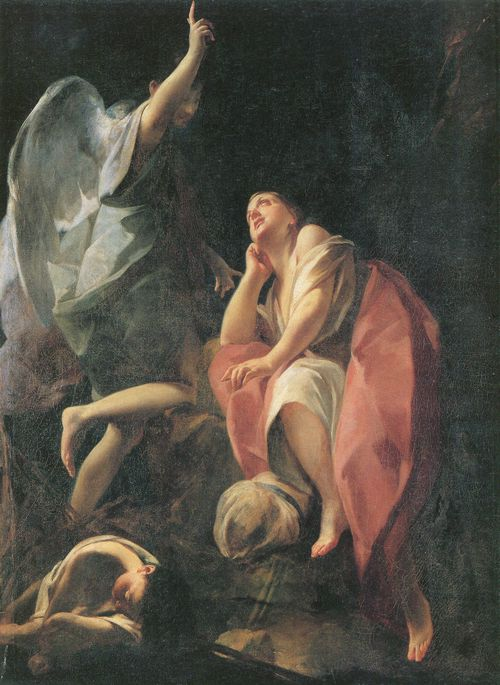
Hagar and Ishmael in the Desert, c. 1715

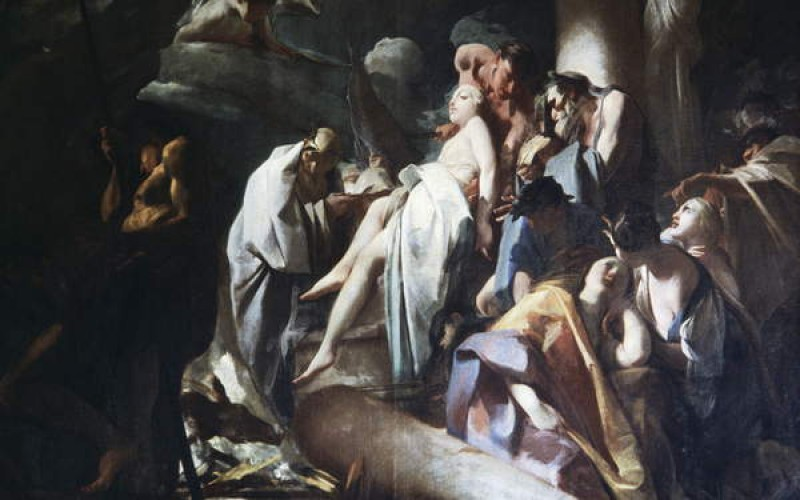
Iphigenia's sacrifice, c. 1715

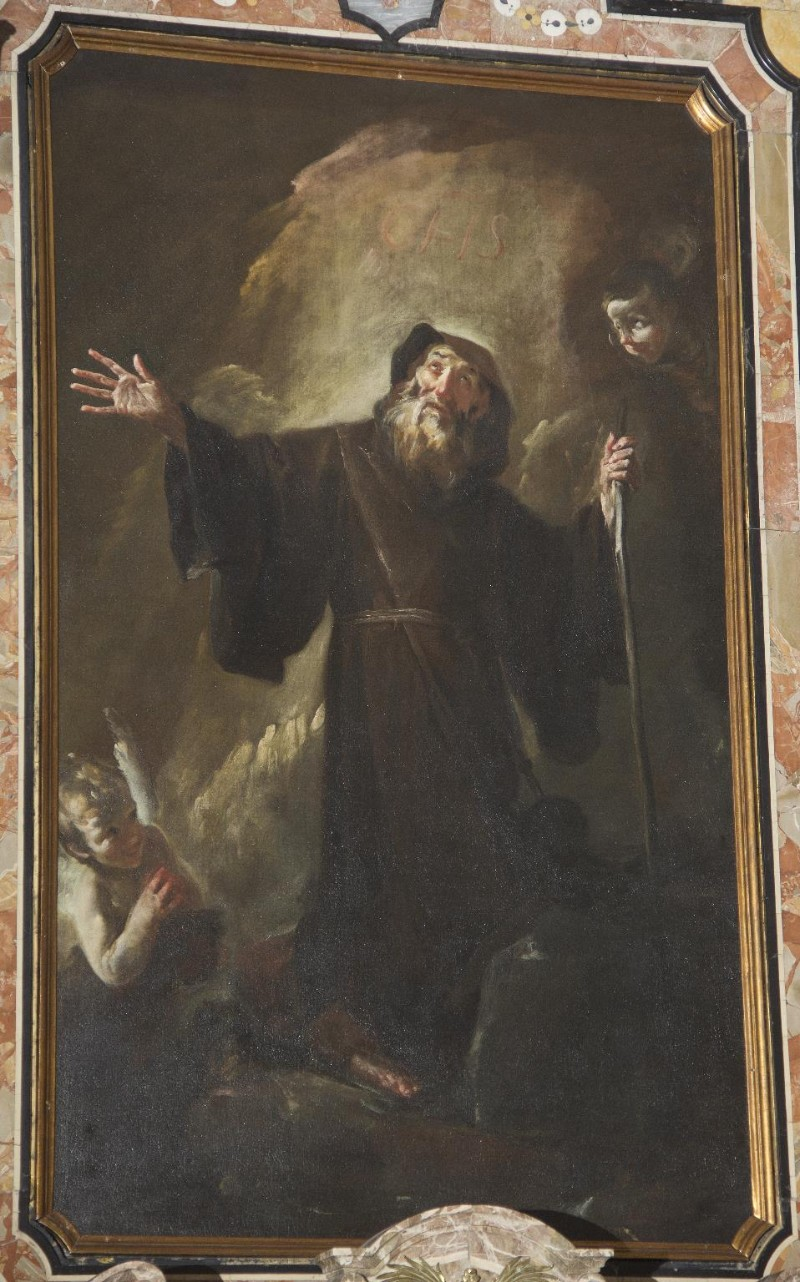
Estasi Saint Francis of Paola, c. 1724

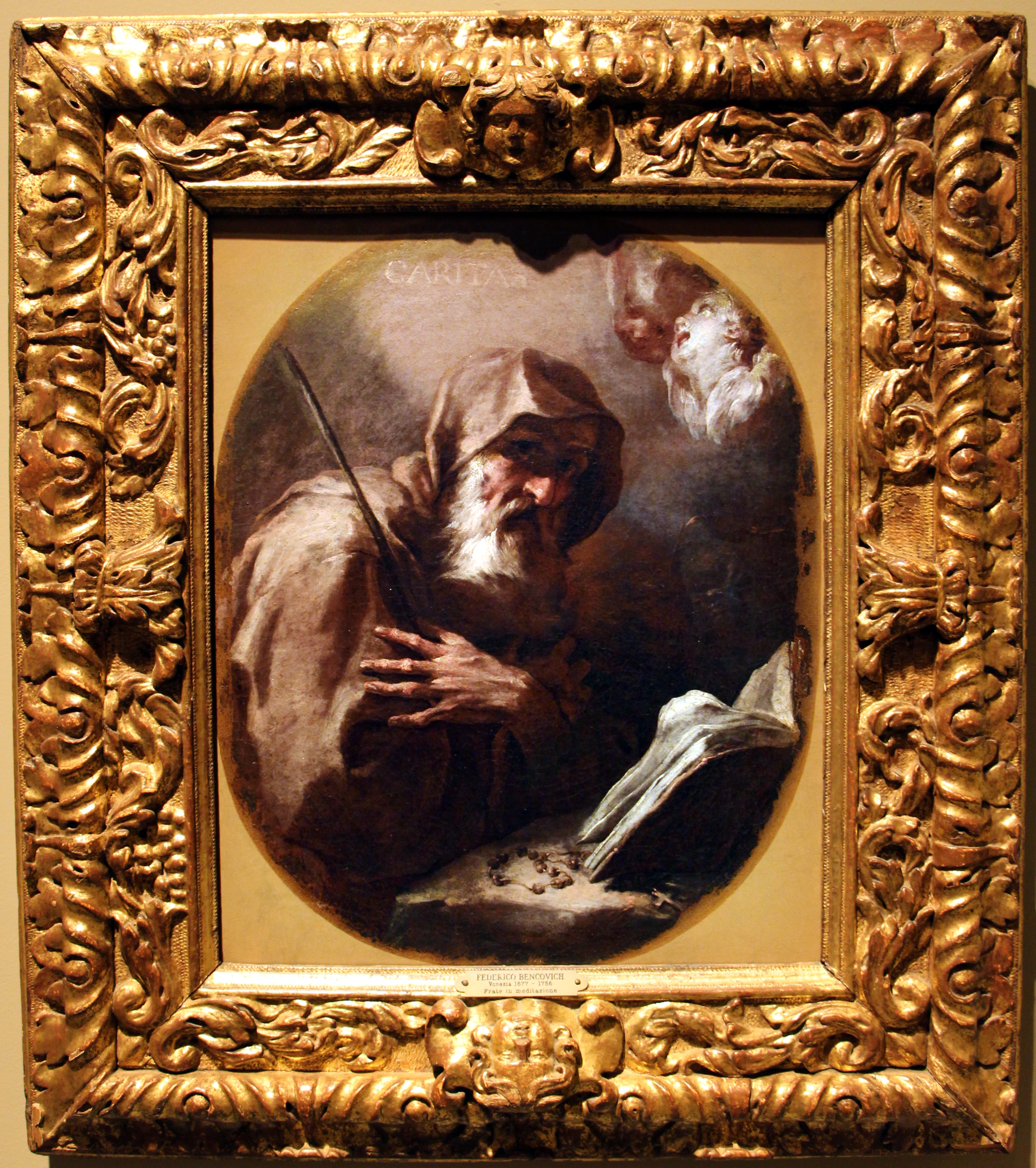
S. Francesco da Paola

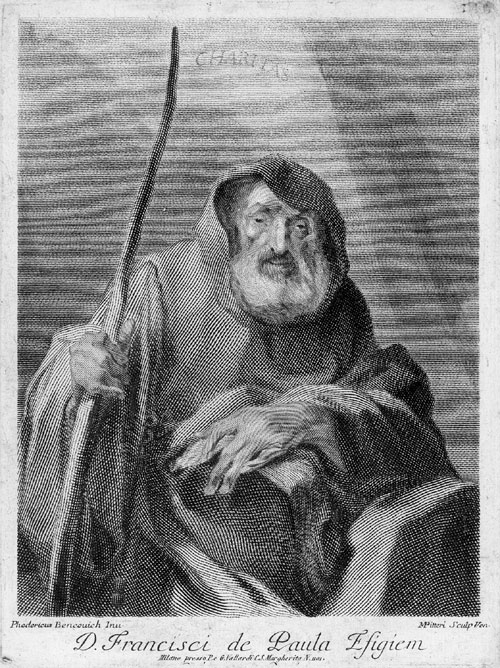
Saint Francis of Paola (etching by Giovanni Marco Pitteri after Bencovich)

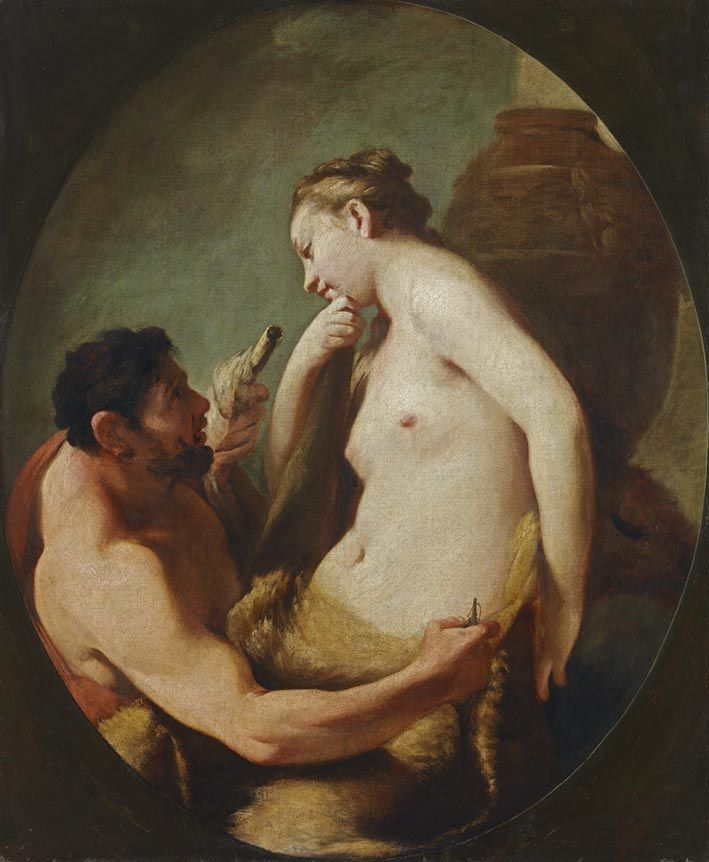
Herkules und Omphale

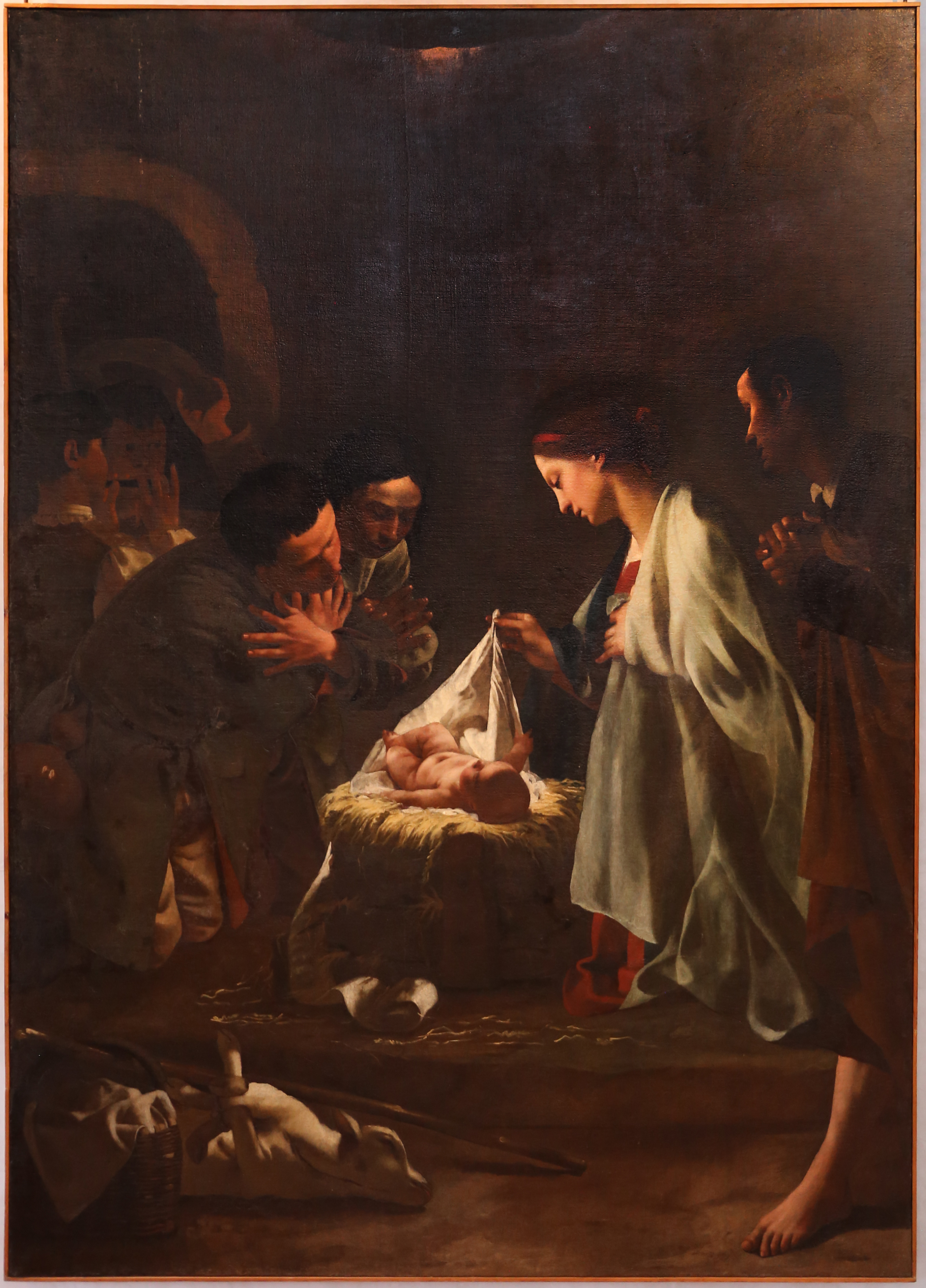
Adorazione dei pastori

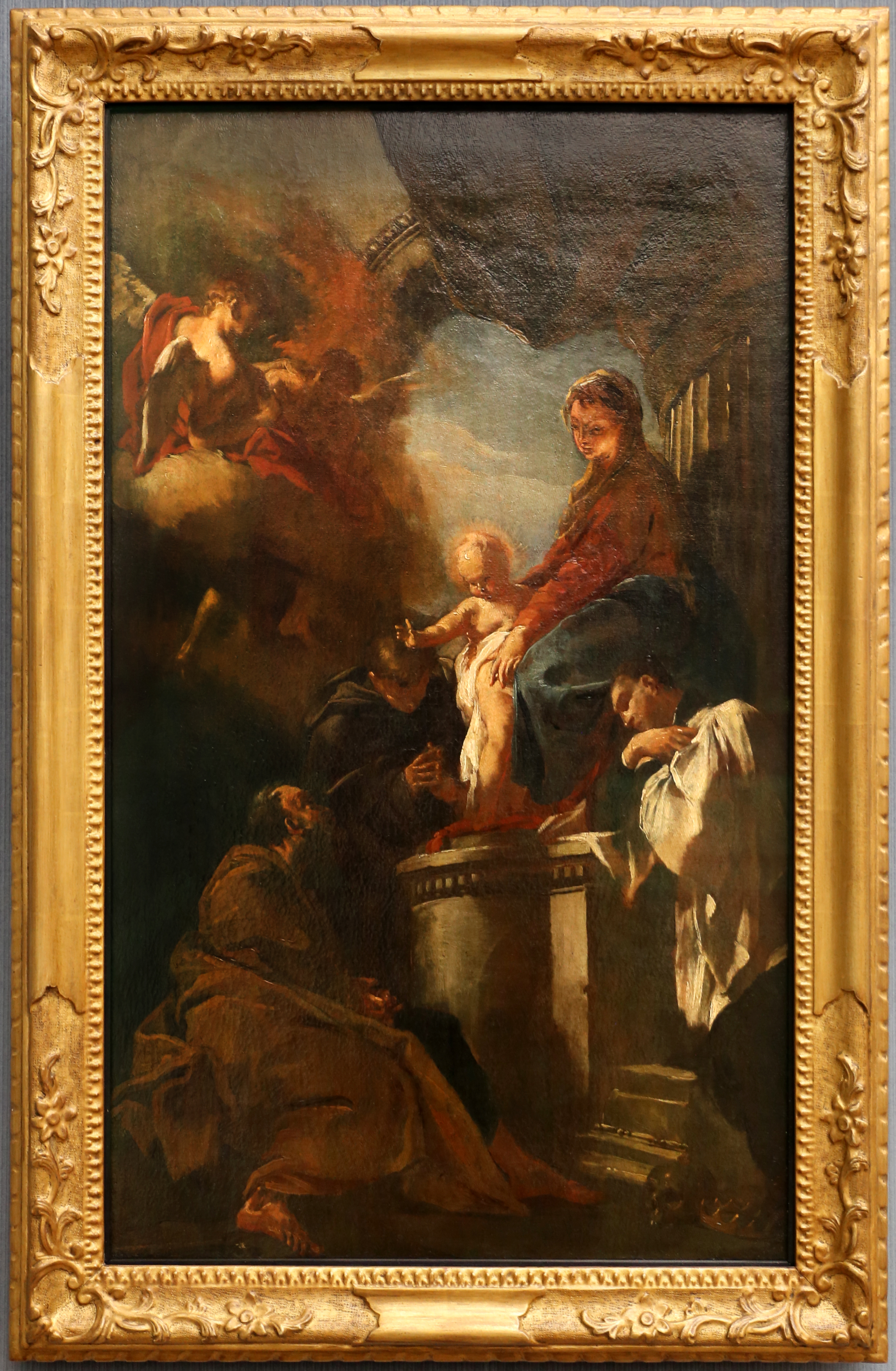
Madonna e santi, c. 1730–1735

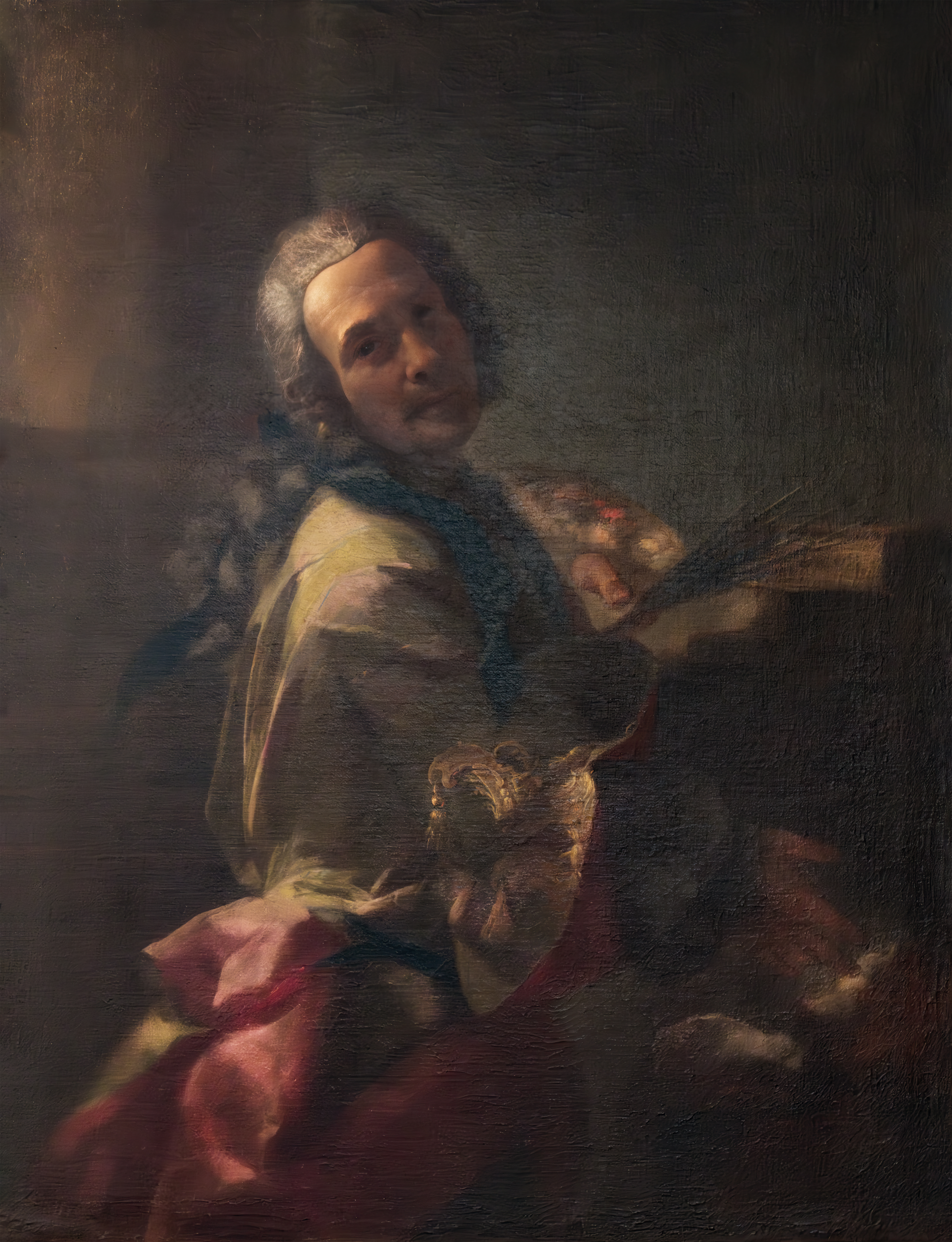
Ritratto di pittore, c. 1735
