= Christ Giving the Keys to Saint Peter =

Christ Giving the Keys to Saint Peter is the name of the following paintings:

- Christ Giving the Keys to Saint Peter (Pittoni), a 1730–1735 oil-on-canvas painting by Giovanni Battista Pittoni
- Christ Giving the Keys to Saint Peter (Rubens), a 1614 painting by Peter Paul Rubens

== See also ==
- The Ascension with Christ Giving the Keys to Saint Peter, a c. 1428–1430 stiacciato marble relief sculpture by Donatello
