= The Death of Sophonisba =

The Death of Sophonisba is the name of the following paintings:

- The Death of Sophonisba (Pittoni), a 1716–1720 oil-on-canvas painting by Giambattista Pittoni
- The Death of Sophonisba (Preti), a 1670s painting by Mattia Preti
