= Ignazio Fiorillo =

Italian composer

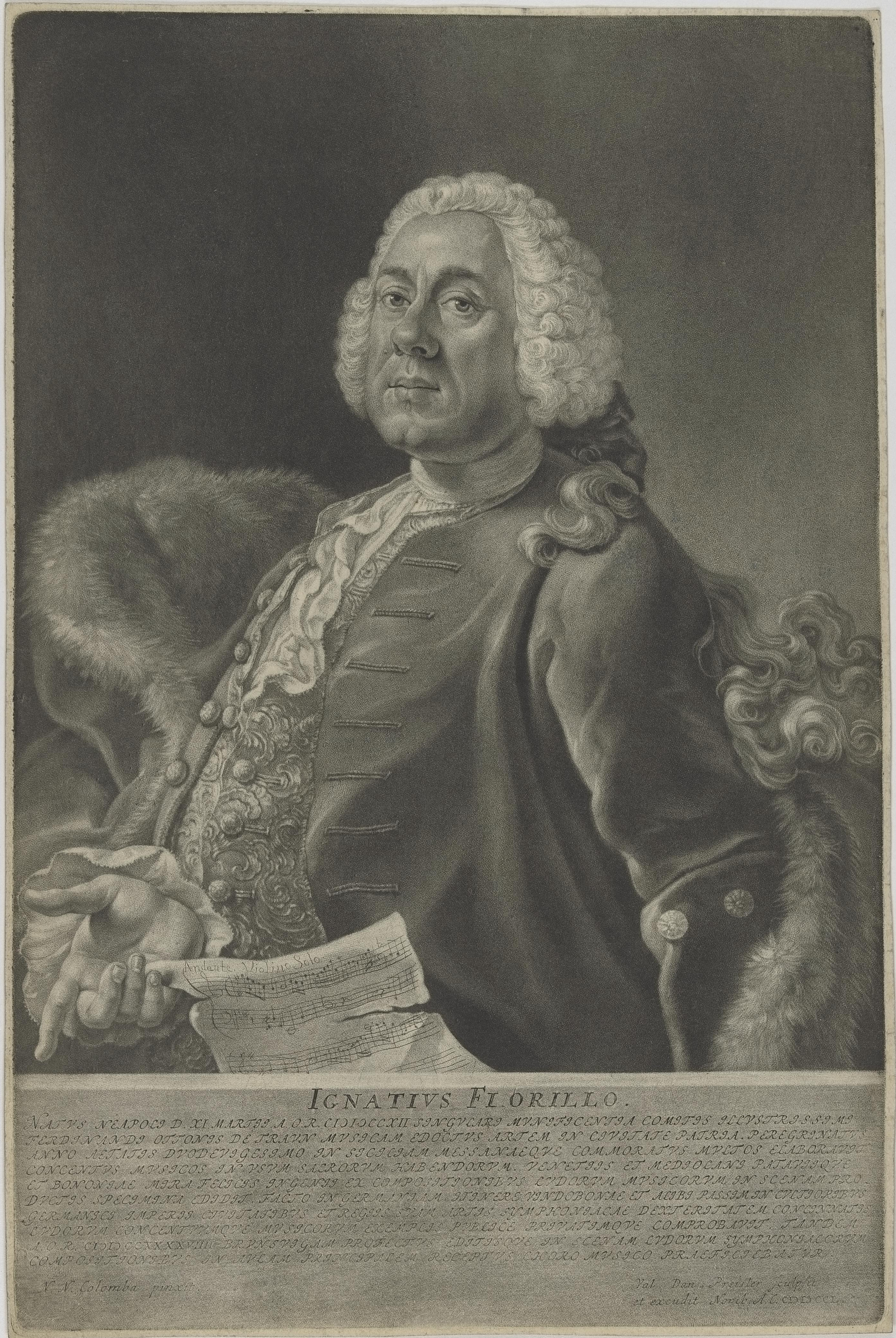
Ignazio Fiorillo in 1750

Ignazio Fiorillo (11 May 1715 – June 1787) was an Italian composer. He is known as an author of opera seria, often composed to the libretti of Pietro Metastasio.

== Biography ==
Fiorillo was born in Naples, Italy. His musical education was supported by Count Ferdinand Otto von Traun, who allowed him to study at the Naples Conservatory, as a pupil of Leonardo Leo and Francesco Durante. His career began with opera L'egeste, premiered in Trieste in 1733. Another opera, Il vincitor di se stesso, was performed in 1741 in Venice, and Fiorillo introduced himself as an opera composer also in Milan and Padua. In the middle of the 1740s, he made several European tours as a member of the ensemble of Phillip Nicolini, specialised in children mime (Teatro dell'Opera Pantomima dei Piccolo Hollandesi di Nicolini). Fiorillo was engaged as a composer for their performances. In 1749, he resided with Nicolini in Braunschweig, at the court of Carl I. von Braunschweig-Wolfenbüttel. Fiorillo was appointed court composer in 1750, and Nicolini became the director of court theatres. In 1762, Fiorillo was engaged by Frederick II, Landgrave of Hesse-Cassel at his court in Kassel. He significantly improved the quality of the court opera in Kassel. Ingazio Fiorillo retired in 1779, and died in Fritzlar, Germany. He was the father of Federigo Fiorillo (1753 - 1823), a violinist and composer, best known for a collection of etudes.

== Works ==
Fiorillo composed the majority of his works during his stay in Braunschweig. His output include operas, intermezzos and stage music for Nicolini's ensemble. His composing style is similar to Johann Adolph Hasse, with apparent melodic invention and with dramatic expression concentrated in the vocal parts. The instrumental elements in his compositions are minimised.

Selected operas

- L'egeste (1733)
- Il vincitor di se stesso (1741)
- Li birbi (1748, libretto by Antonio Maria Zanetti)
- Adriano in Siria (1750)
- Il Demofoonte (1750)
- La Didone abbandonata (1750)
- Siface (1752)
- Alessandro nell'Indie (1752)
- Il Ciro riconosciuto (1753)
- Il Demetrio (1753)
- Lucio Vero (1756)
- La Nitteti (1758)
