= Giovanni Antonio Faldoni =

Italian painter

Giovanni Antonio Faldoni (24 April 1689 – c. 1770) was an Italian painter and engraver, citizen of the Republic of Venice.

He was born in Asolo, province of Treviso, and was active in Venice. He trained under a landscape painter named Antonio Luciani, and learned engraving with a burin from Egidio Sadeler, then Claude Mellan. He created a series of portraits of the Doges of Venice and procurators of St Mark and Knights of the Star of Gold. He engraved a series of paintings, portraits, and busts of Roman Emperors for Anton Maria Zanetti the Elder.

Exiled from Venice in 1765, he moved to Rome, where his traces are lost.

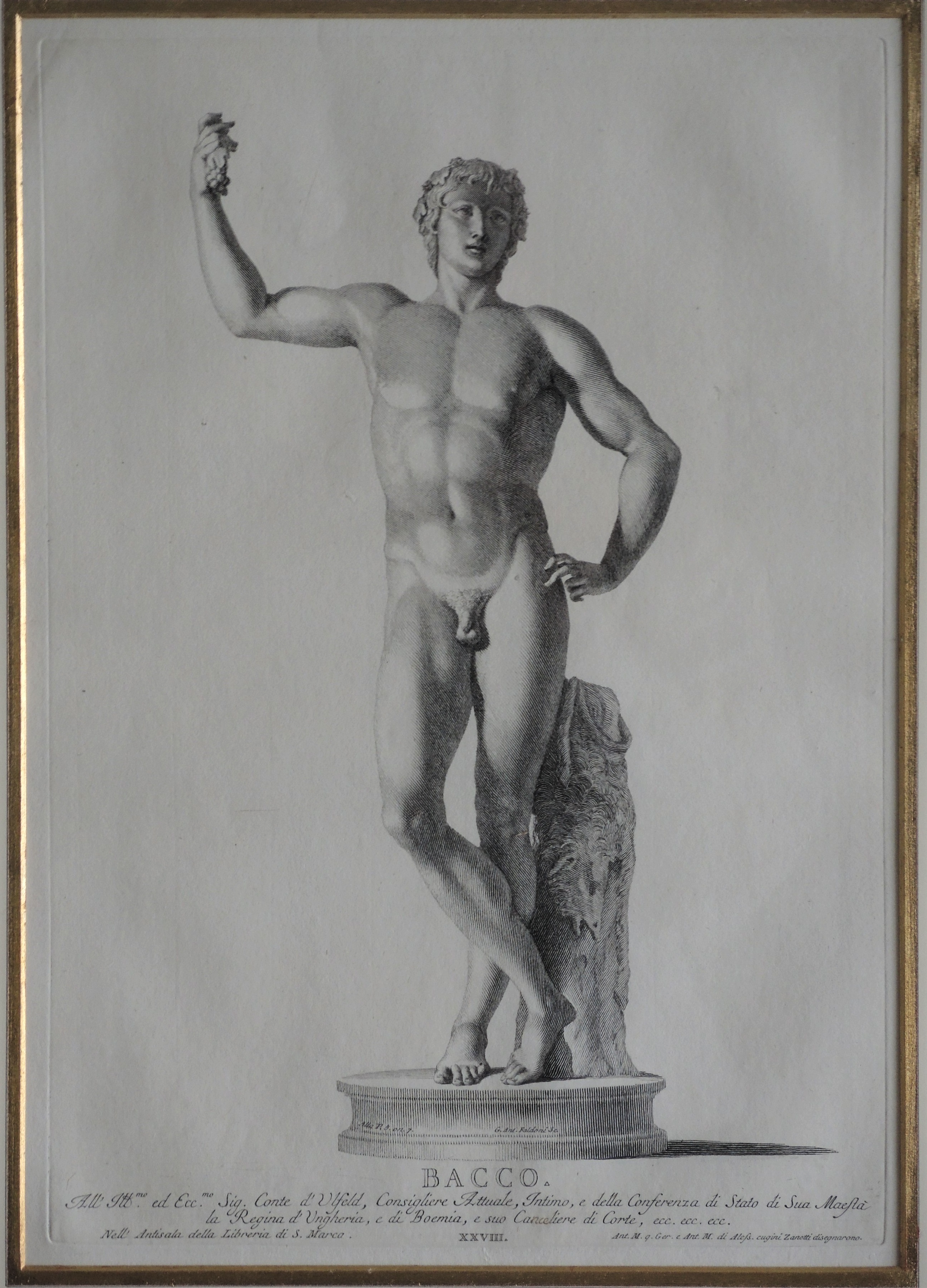
G. A. Faldoni, Bacco, 1740. From Count Anton Maris Zanetti's Delle Antiche Statue Greche E Romane, Che Nell'Antisala Della Libreria di San Marco, e in altri luoghi publici di Venezia si trovano, Venezia, 1740
