= The Emperor Honorius Making Constantius His Co-Ruler =

Painting by Giambattista Pittoni

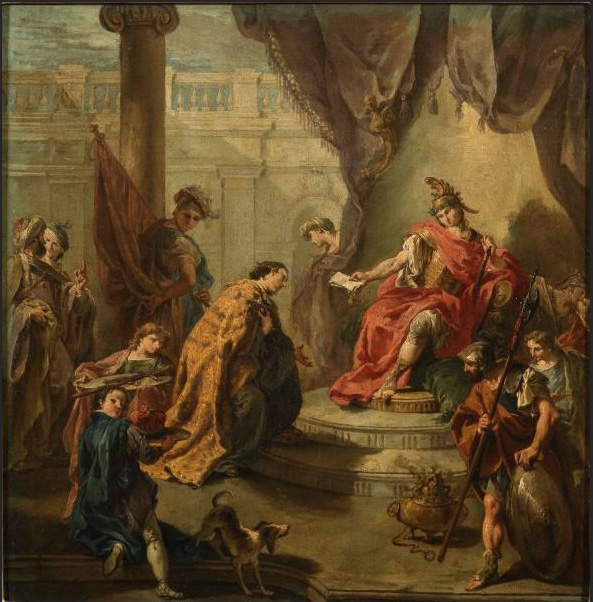
The Emperor Honorius Making Constantius His Co-Ruler (c. 1730) by Giambattista Pittoni

The Emperor Honorius Making Constantius His Co-Ruler is an oil on canvas painting by Giambattista Pittoni from c. 1730. It has been in the Pushkin Museum, in Moscow, since 1924. It shows a rarely-painted scene from Roman history in which Honorius divided his power with Constantius, husband of Honorius's sister Galla Placidia.
