= Antonio Maria Zanetti (the younger) =

Venetian art historian and opera librettist

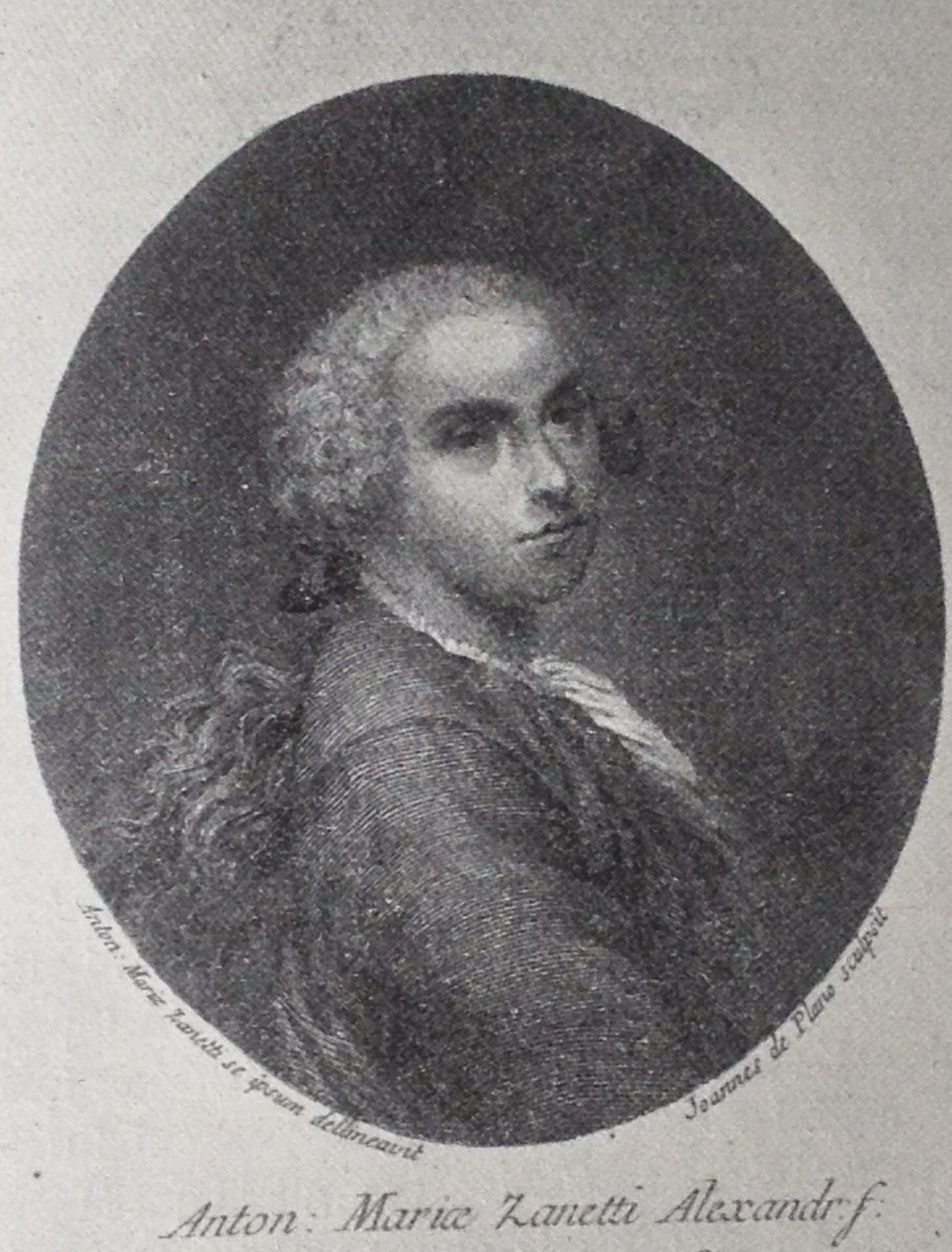
Antonio Maria Zanetti (the younger)

Antonio Maria Zanetti (the younger), also Anton Maria Zanetti, (1706–1778) was a Venetian art historian and opera librettist. He was noted for his knowledge of antiquities, numismatics, statues, cameos, and sculpted gems. He was skilled in architecture and perspective and was an expert in music. As custodian of the Marciana Library (1737–1778), he compiled the first modern catalogues of the manuscript collection with detailed bibliographical information. He wrote libretti for operas set to music by composers Niccolò Jommelli and Ignazio Fiorillo.

== Life ==
Antonio Maria was born in the parish of San Giacomo dell'Orio in Venice on 1 January 1706. He was the elder of two sons. The family of his father, Alessandro Zanetti, belonged to the citizen class, whereas the family of his mother, Antonia Limonti, originated in Milan. At an unknown later date, the family transferred to the parish of Santa Maria Mater Domini. As a youth, Antonio Maria studied with the Jesuits. He had a particular aptitude for the classics and over time, became proficient in Greek. He also learned to paint under the guidance of Nicolò Bambini. Most importantly, he became a protégé of his homonymous older cousin Antonio Maria Zanetti and developed into a distinguished scholar of the antiquities and an art connoisseur.

Beginning in the early 1720s, Zanetti collaborated with his elder cousin on the edition of a two-volume work illustrating the classical sculpture conserved in the Venetian public collections. For this work, Zanetti provided many of the drawings of the statues. The engraving plates were made primarily by Giovanni Antonio Faldoni along with Giuseppe Camerata, Giovanni Cattini, Carlo Orsolini, Marco Alvise Pitteri, and Giuseppe Patrini. Although the initial project called for the presentation of all of the classical statues in the public collections, the two volumes of Delle antiche statue greche e romane, che nell'antisala della Libreria di San Marco, e in altri luoghi pubblici di Venezia si trovano, published in 1740 and 1743, only present 100 pieces. These were primarily from the Public Statuary but also included five statues in the courtyard of the Doge's Palace, the four horses of St Mark's Basilica, and the lions of the Arsenal. During this time, Zanetti was also tasked by Lorenzo Tiepolo, the state librarian, with compiling a complete two-volume catalogue with detailed descriptions of the 224 statues belonging to the Public Statuary, located within the Marciana Library.

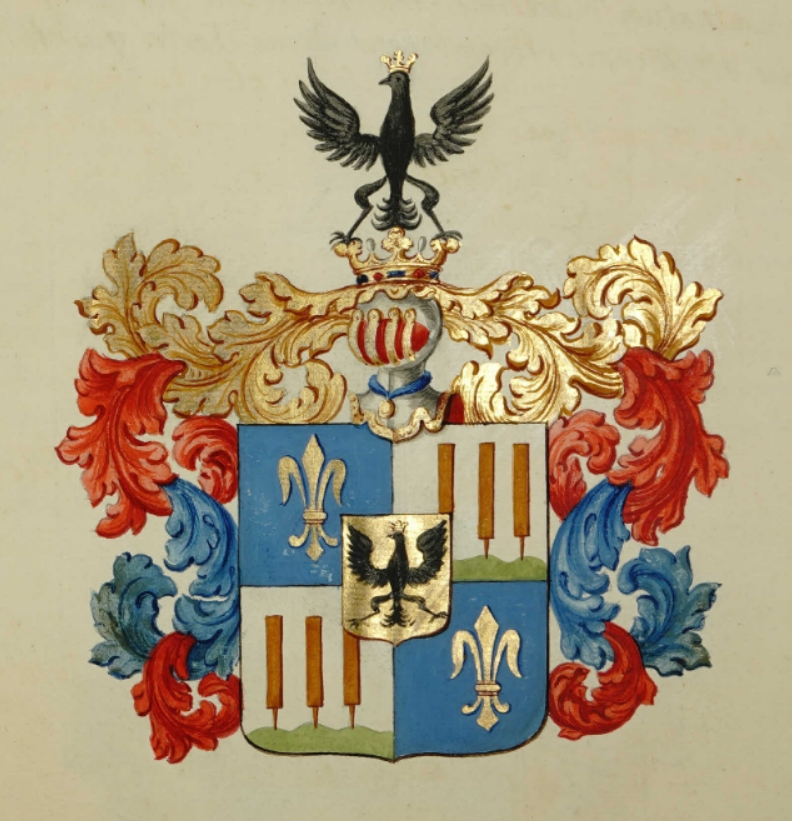
The Dano-Norwegian coat of arms offered by Frederick V and rejected by the Zanetti cousins.

In 1736, Tiepolo also asked Zanetti, together with Antonio Bongiovanni, to catalogue the manuscripts in the library. Zanetti was subsequently nominated custodian of the library, in 1737, when the position became vacant. The catalogs of the Greek, Latin, and vernacular codices, published in 1740 and 1741, contain descriptions of 1356 codices. With respect to the previous 'catalogues', printed inventories, the new catalogues followed modern guidelines and constituted a considerable development in providing readers with bibliographical material.

Zanetti wrote the opera libretto Li birbi which was first set to music by Michele Fini for a production at the Teatro San Angelo in 1732. This libretto was later set to a different score by composer Ignazio Fiorillo for a production in Prague in 1748. Antonio collaborated with his brother, Girolamo Francesco Zanetti, on writing the libretto for the Venetian dramma per musica Sofonisba which was staged in Venice in 1746 with music by composer Niccolò Jommelli.

On 4 November 1750, in response to Zanetti and his homonymous cousin having dedicated a book to his father Christian VI, King Frederick V of Denmark and Norway awarded each of them a gold medal adorned with diamonds, and also offered noble status, along with a grant of arms, in Denmark and Norway. However, learning of the fees involved, the Zanetti cousins returned the letters patent to Copenhagen, explaining that they didn't see themselves served with other nobility than the one that the emperor had granted to their ancestors.

== Works ==
- Descrizione delle pubbliche pitture di Venezia (1733)
- Delle antiche statue greche e romane, che nell'antisala della Libreria di San Marco, e in altri luoghi pubblici di Venezia si trovano, vol I, (1740)
- Delle antiche statue greche e romane, che nell'antisala della Libreria di San Marco, e in altri luoghi pubblici di Venezia si trovano, vol II, (1743)
- Varie pitture a fresco de' principali maestri veneziani (1760)
- Della pittura veneziana e delle opere pubbliche de' veneziani maestri (1771)

== Bibliography ==
- Borroni, Fabio, I Due Anton Maria Zanetti (Firenze: Sansoni Antiquariato, 1956)
- Boorsch, Suzanne, Venetian prints and books in the age of Tiepolo (New York: The Metropolitan Museum of Art, 1997)
- Zanetti, Antonio Maria, ed., Græca D. Marci Bibliotheca codicum manu scriptorum per titulos digesta (Venetiis: Casparis Ghirardi & Simonem Occhi, 1740)
- Zanetti, Antonio Maria, ed., Latina et italica D. Marci Bibliotheca codicum manu scriptorum per titulos digesta (Venetiis: Casparis Ghirardi & Simonem Occhi, 1741)
- Zanetti, Girolamo, 'Memoria', in Antonio Maria Zanetti, Varie pitture a fresco de' principali maestri veneziani (Venezia; s.n., 1760)
- Zorzi, Marino, La libreria di san Marco: libri, lettori, società nella Venezia dei dogi (Milano: Mondadori, 1987) ISBN 8804306866
