= Christ Giving the Keys to Saint Peter (Rubens) =

Painting by Peter Paul Rubens

Christ Giving the Keys to St. Peter
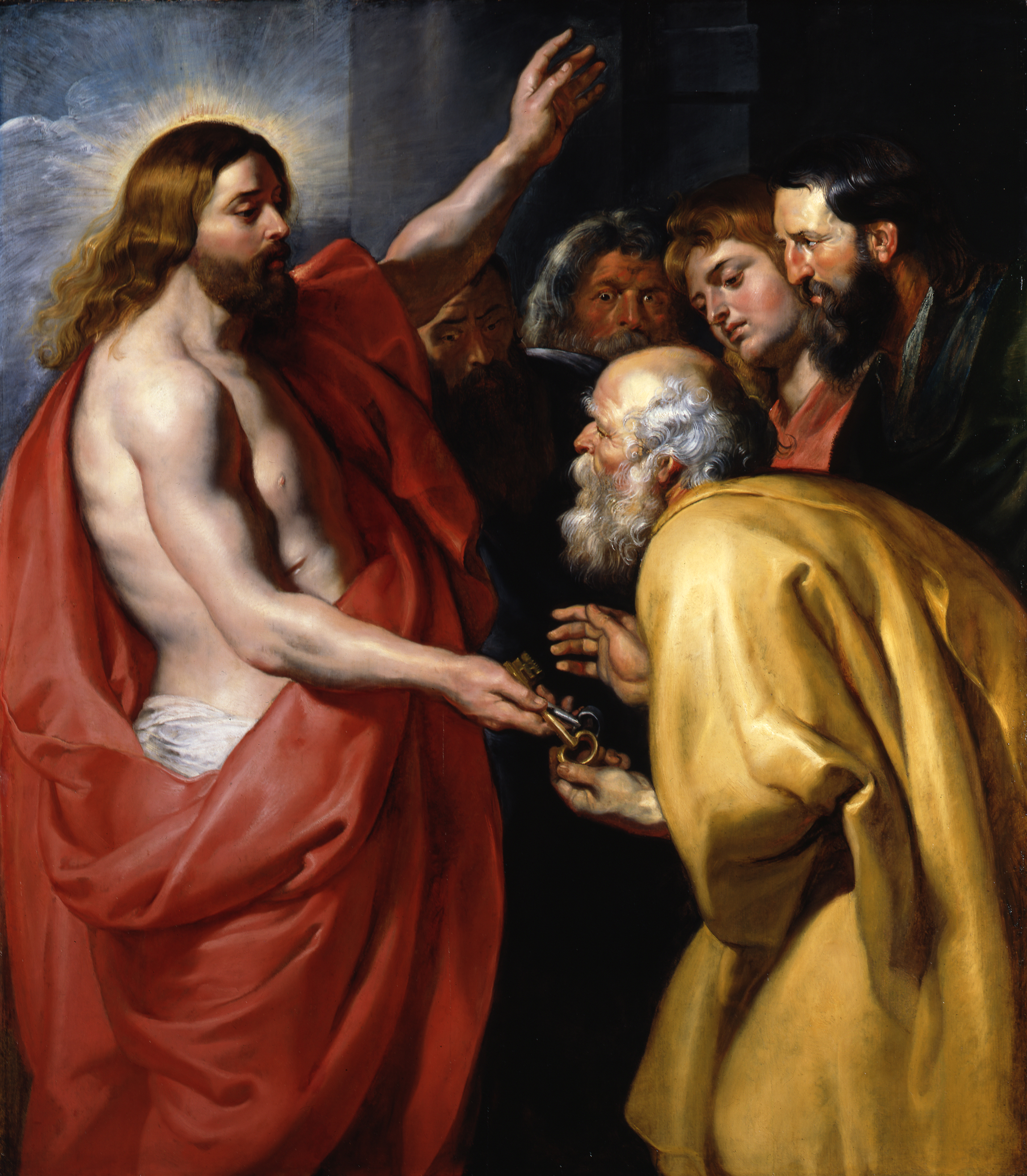
- Artist: Peter Paul Rubens
- Year: c 1612–1614
- Type: Oil on oak panel
- Dimensions: 182.6 cm × 159 cm (71.9 in × 63 in)
- Location: Gemäldegalerie; Berlin

Christ Giving the Keys to Saint Peter is a painting by the Flemish artist Peter Paul Rubens, completed in 1614. It is now in the Gemäldegalerie in Berlin.

== History ==
The painting was probably produced between 1612 and 1614 to fulfil a commission by the Kapellekerk in Brussels for a painting to decorate the tomb of Peter Bruegel the Elder, showing his name saint (i.e. Peter). This commission was probably set up by David Teniers the Younger, the son-in-law of Jan Brueghel the Elder - he may even have been involved in its production.

In 1765 the church council sold the painting to the collector Gerrit Braamcamp for 5,000 guilder, in return for a promise to replace it with a copy. Over the following decades it was owned by several collectors, said to include van Lankeren in Antwerp, Nieuwwenhuys, Lord Northwick in Cheltenham, William Leonard Grant in London, Potemkin in Brussels, R W Bacon in New York City and Marcel von Nemes in Paris.

In 1931 it was auctioned by Cassirer Helbing in Munich, then in 1936 it was among the items seized from the Dresdner Bank - it was then assigned to Berlin's Gemäldegalerie. In 1945 the painting was the only one by Rubens left on the Museum Island in Berlin and from then until 1997 it was shown in the Bode Museum. In 1998 it moved to the Neubau in the Gemäldegalerie and re-integrated into its Rubens collection.

== Bibliography ==
- Irene Geismeier, Holländische und flämische Gemälde des siebzehnten Jahrhunderts im Bode-Museum, Berlin 1976, S. 71
- Prestel-Museumsführer, Gemäldegalerie Berlin, München und New York 1998, S. 69
