= Abraham's Sacrifice of Isaac (Bencovich) =

1715 painting by Federico Bencovich

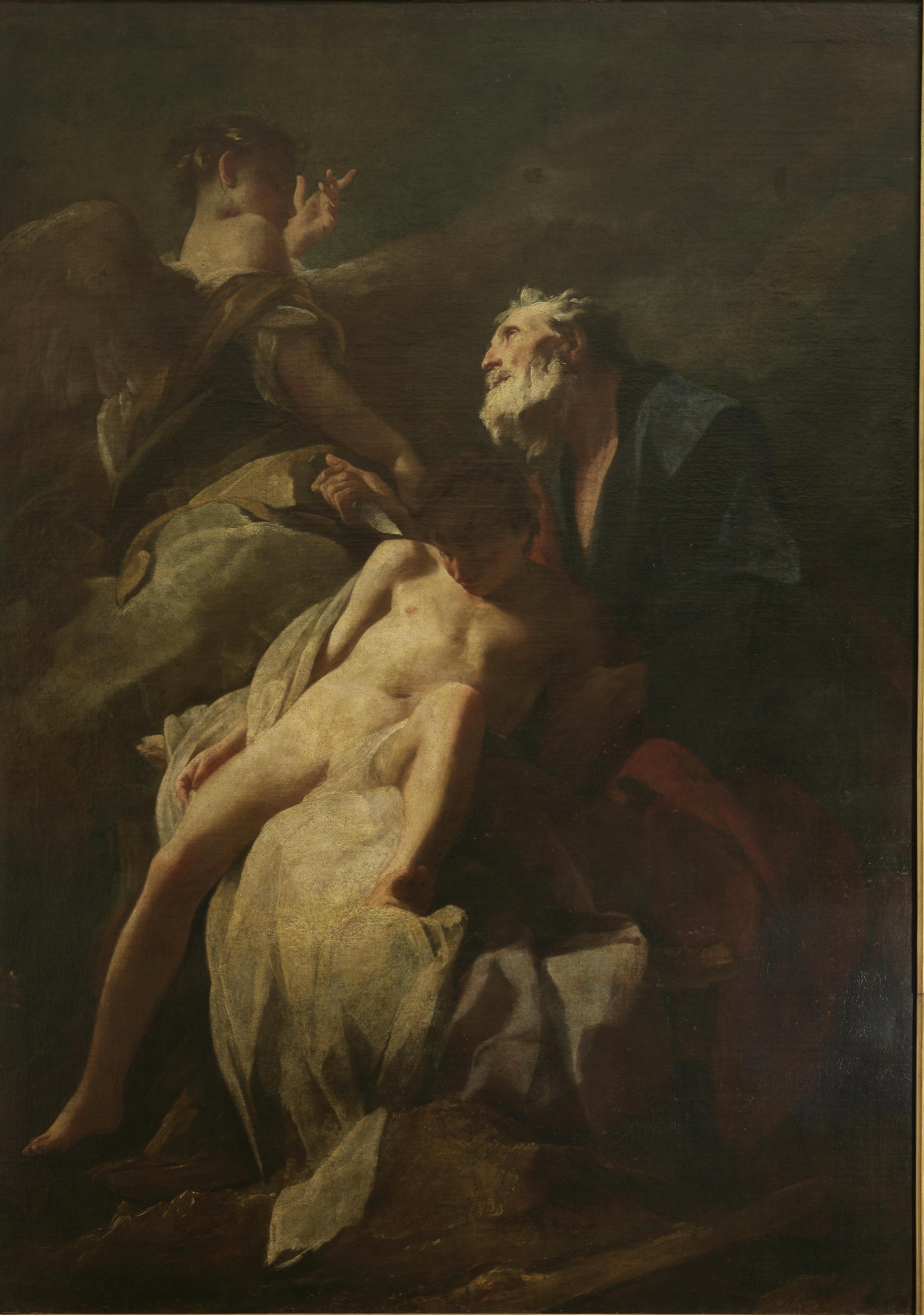
- Artist: Federico Bencovich
- Year: 1715
- Medium: oil on canvas
- Dimensions: 220.7 cm × 165.3 cm (86.9 in × 65.1 in)
- Location: Strossmayer Gallery of Old Masters, Zagreb

Abraham's Sacrifice of Isaac is a 1715 painting by the Baroque artist Federico Bencovich in the Strossmayer Gallery of Old Masters.

This painting shows Abraham with a knife in his hand raised to kill his son Isaac at the moment that the angel intervenes. Bencovich became court painter of the Archbishop-Elector of Mainz Lothar Franz von Schönborn in 1715 and completed four large canvas masterpieces for his gallery in Schloss Weißenstein. These were Apollo and Marcia, Hagar and Ishmael in the desert, Iphigenia's sacrifice and Abraham's sacrifice of Isaac. The canvas of Abraham was taken in the beginning of the 19th century, but it was attributed to Piazzetta at the time. The Strossmayer gallery in Croatia purchased the painting at a London auction in 1936 and research on the painting has determined this to be the same one.

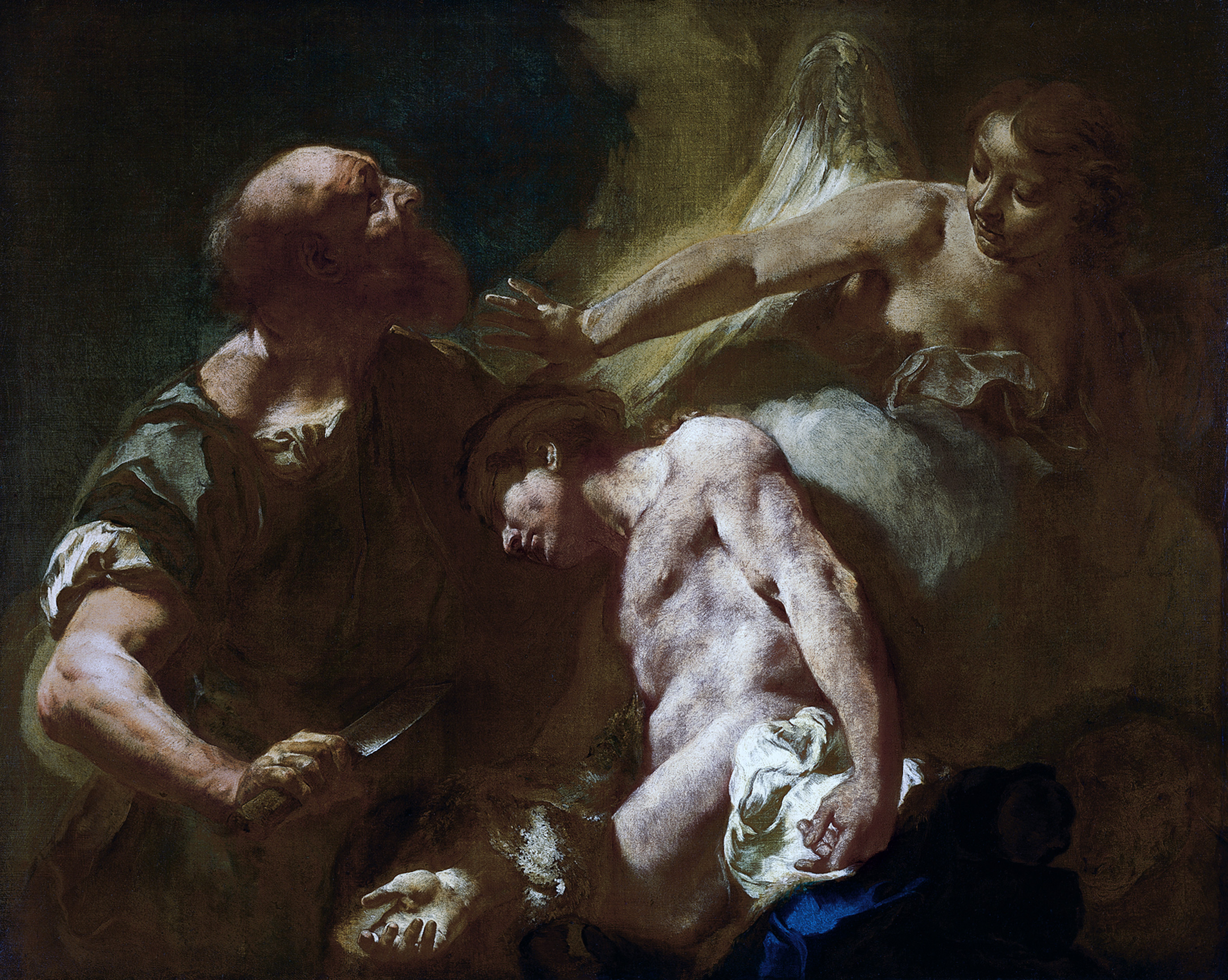
The Sacrifice of Isaac, 1715, by Piazzetta
