= Christ Giving the Keys to Saint Peter (Pittoni) =

Painting by Giambattista Pittoni

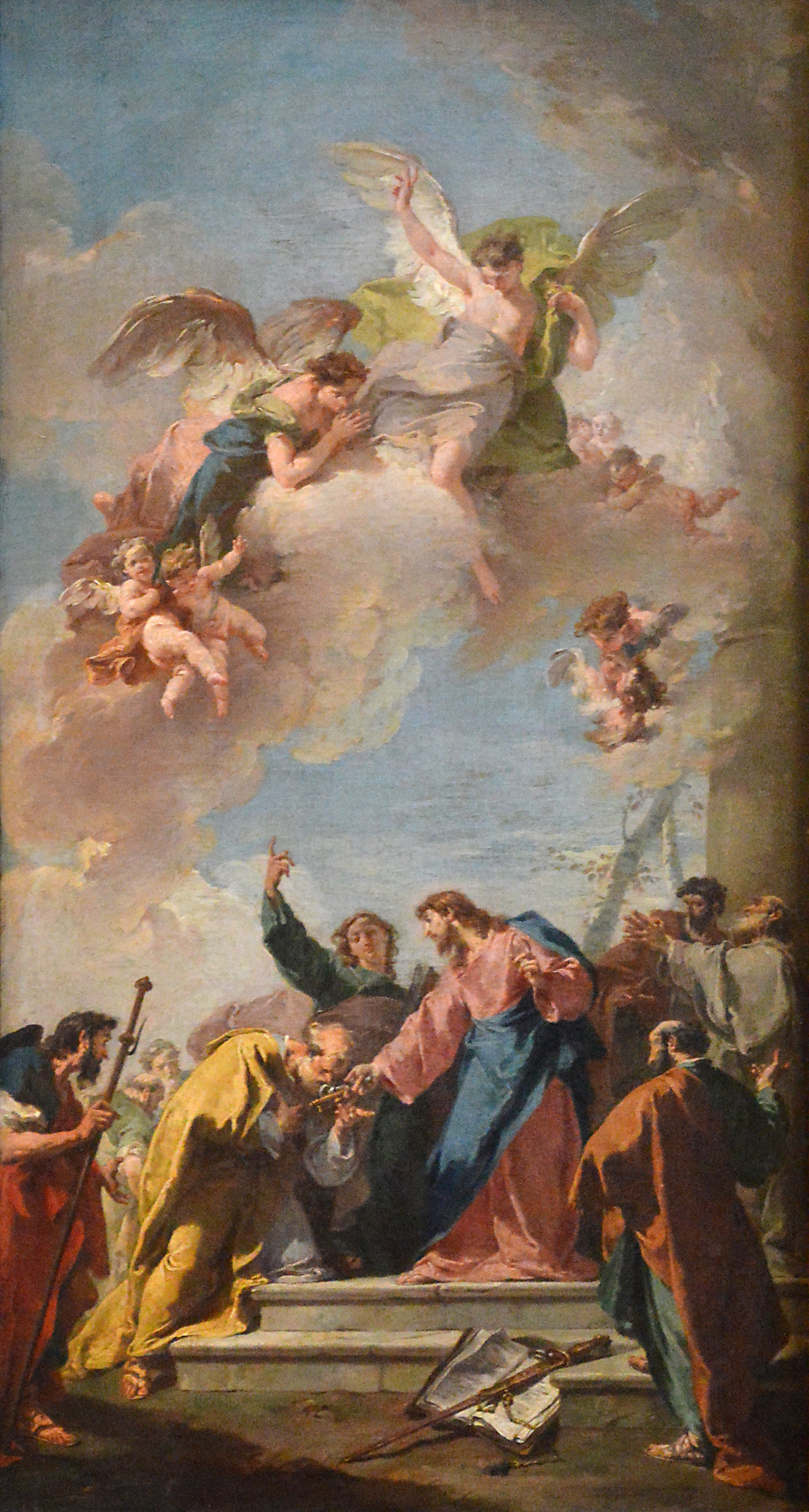
- Artist: Giovanni Battista Pittoni
- Year: c. 1730-1735
- Medium: Oil on canvas
- Dimensions: 82 cm × 42 cm (32 in × 17 in)
- Location: Louvre, Paris

Christ Giving the Keys to Saint Peter or The Delivery of the Keys is an oil on canvas painting by the Italian artist Giambattista Pittoni, from c. 1730–1735. It is held in the Louvre Museum, in Paris.

== History and description ==
It shows a scene from Matthew (16:18–20). There was perhaps an original sketch of the painter, now lost. Other depictions of the same subject by Pittoni are in the Musée des Beaux-Arts de Tours and at the Ashmolean Museum, in Oxford.

The work depicts Jesus elevating Saint Peter to the rank of Prince of the Apostles, by symbolically giving him the keys to the kingdom of Heaven. Standing on a staircase, Jesus appears in the center of the painting, leaning towards Peter, who kneels to receive the keys. On the ground, lie the iconographic symbols of an open book and a sword, while in the sky, some angels, seraphs and cherubs, appear among the clouds to witness and to celebrate the event. Saint James the Great appears on the left, holding a pilgrim's staff. Saint John the Apostle, at the center, exalts the spiritual meaning of the delivery of the keys by pointing to Heaven. Their expressions testify the inner emotion of the apostles who witness the scene.

Constance Lavagne d’Ortigue, from the Louvre, wrote that "In this mature work, Pittoni shows a certain rigidity and takes up elements from his previous compositions such as angels in the sky. However, he knows how to maintain a freshness characteristic of the Venetian Rococo. The colors, in simple masses, almost without nuances, mark the space with a coat or a jacket, as if they served to differentiate the figures in a more categorical way."

== Bibliography ==
- Sergeĭ Androsov, Lorenzo Zichichi, L'Hermitage dello Zar Nicola I: capolavori acquisiti in Italia, Ed. Il cigno GG Ed., 2007, (in Italian) ISBN 887831207X
