= Marcell Nemes =

Hungarian financier, art collector and art dealer (1866-1930)

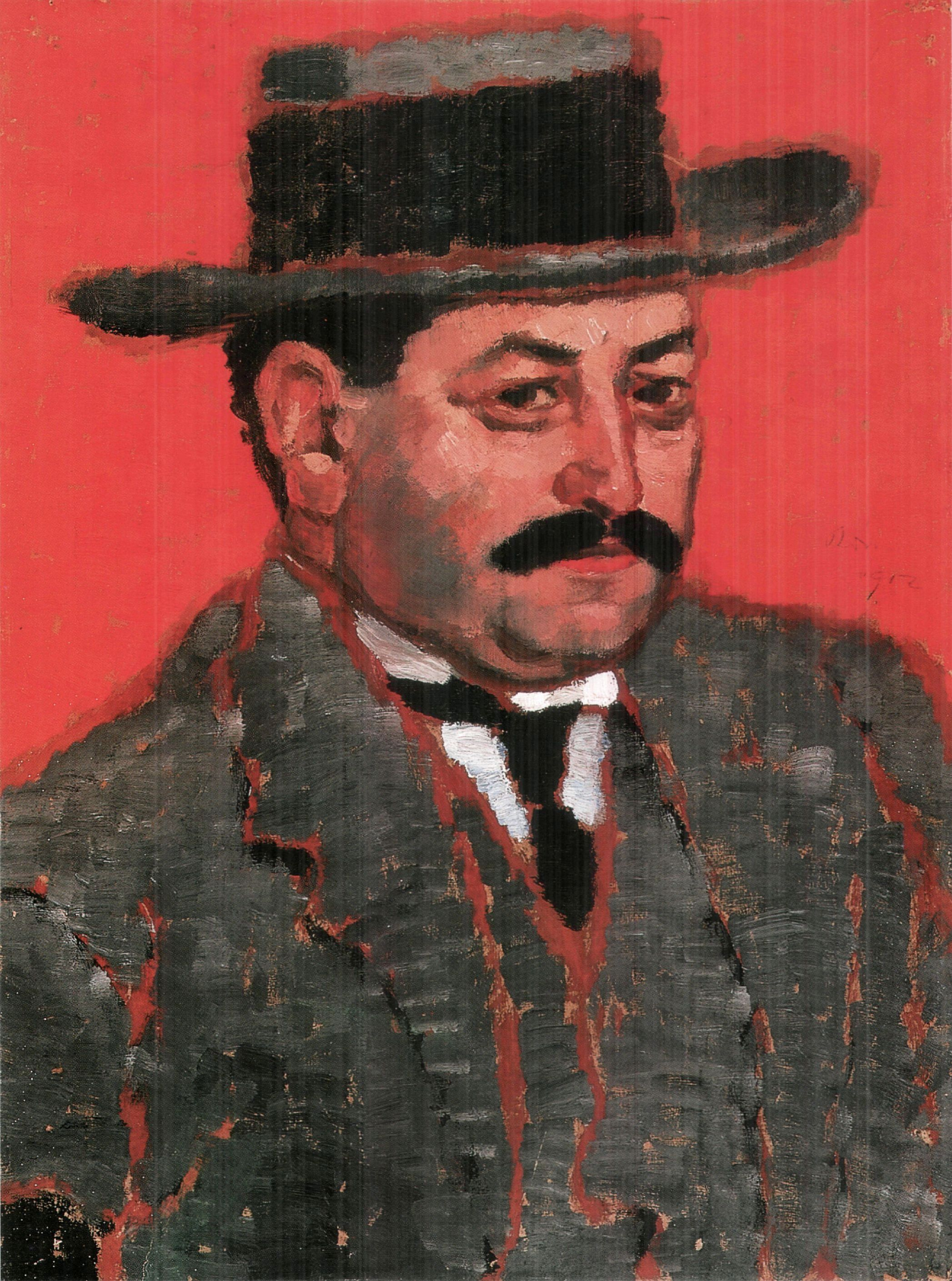
József Rippl-Rónai: Portrait of Marcell Nemes (1912)

Marcell or Marczell Nemes (4 May 1866, in Jánoshalma – 28 October 1930, in Budapest) was a Hungarian financier, art collector and art dealer. He was born Moses Klein.

== Life ==
Nemes' ancestors traded in wool and tobacco in Transylvania since the 1830s, expanding into the timber and coal trade and financial transactions by the end of the 19th century. Marcell Nemes Magyarized his name, and was appointed a Royal Hungarian Councillor in 1903 due to his economic success and was ennobled as a Nobleman of Janoshalma in 1910.

He began collecting and trading art in the 1890s. In addititon to woven fabrics from the Renaissance, he collected furniture, sculptures and old paintings from the Dutch and Flemish 17th century, as well as paintings by his contemporaries, especially 19th century French painting from Eugène Delacroix to Vincent van Gogh. Nemes became one of the rediscoverers of El Greco by finding some of his paintings himself in Spain and adding them to his collection. His purchases were based on Julius Meier-Graefe's preliminary art-historical work and the assistance of Paris and Munich art dealers. For example, he purchased Greco's Immaculate Conception and a Carrying of the Cross in the 1911 exhibition of old Spanish art organized by August Liebmann Mayer at the Heinemann Gallery in Munich.

Nemmes was an important art collector. Artworks from his collection were confiscated and socialized during the Hungarian Soviet Republic in 1919. They were exhibited in the Hall of Art from 14 June onwards.

== Bibliography ==
- István Németh: Von El Greco zu den französischen Expressionisten: Die Ausstellung der Sammlung von Marczell von Nemes in Budapest, München und Düsseldorf. in: Beat Wismer: El Greco und die Moderne. Museum Kunstpalast, Düsseldorf, 28. April - 12. August 2012. Ostfildern : Hatje Cantz, 2012 ISBN 978-3-7757-3326-7, S. 386-393
- István Németh: Der Greco-Sammler Marczell von Nemes und die deutschen Museen, in: Matthias Weniger (Hrsg.): Greco, Velazquez, Goya. Spanische Malerei aus deutschen Sammlungen. München, Prestel 2005
- Veronika Schroeder: Spanien und die Moderne - Marczell von Nemes, Julius Meier-Graefe, Hugo Tschudi. in: Manet bis van Gogh : Hugo von Tschudi und der Kampf um die Moderne. München : Prestel, 1996 ISBN 3-7913-1748-2, S. 419-423
- Veronika Schroeder: El Greco im frühen deutschen Expressionismus : von der Kunstgeschichte als Stilgeschichte zur Kunstgeschichte als Geistesgeschichte. Frankfurt am Main [u.a.] : Lang, 1998 ISBN 3-631-32305-0 Diss. München 1996
- Sammlung Marczell von Nemes: Gemälde, Skulpturen, Textilen, Kunstgewerbe. Auktionskatalog. Auktionsleitung: Mensing & Sohn / Cassirer / Helbing. München 1931. München: Verl. Helbing 1931. Geleitwort von Max J. Friedländer
- Simon Meller: Marczell von Nemes, in: Zeitschrift für Bildenden Kunst, Leipzig, 1931–32, Nr. 65, S. 25-30
- Paul Schubring: Die Sammlung Nemes in Budapest, in: Zeitschrift für Bildende Kunst 22(1910–11) 28-38
- Gabriel von Térey: Die Sammlung Marcell von Nemes in Budapest, in: Kunst und Künstler 9 (1911) 217-224
- Gabriel von Térey: Die Greco-Bilder der Sammlung Nemes, in: Der Cicerone 3 (1911) 1-6
- Katalog der aus der Sammlung des Kgl. Rates Marczell von Nemes - Budapest ausgestellte Gemälde, Alte Pinakothek, München 1911.
- Katalog der aus der Sammlung des Kgl. Rates Marczell von Nemes - Budapest ausgestellte Gemälde, Städtische Kunsthalle, Düsseldorf 1912.
