= Rodolfo Pallucchini =

Italian art historian and professor (1908 – 1989)

- Born: Rodolfo Pallucchini; November 10, 1908; Milan, Italy
- Died: April 8, 1989 (aged 80); Venice, Italy
- Occupations: Art historian officer

Rodolfo Pallucchini (born November 10, 1908 in Milan, Italy, and died April 8, 1989, in Venice) was an Italian art historian, professor, administrator, curator and patron. Pallucchini was the son of an engineer who moved with his family to Venice in 1925. In nearby Padua, Pallucchini followed his university studies, graduating in literature in 1931 under the guidance of Giuseppe Fiocco with a thesis, published three years later, focused on the figure of Giovanni Battista Piazzetta.

== Career ==
In 1935, Pallucchini was appointed inspector at the Estense Gallery in Modena, and became its director in 1939. His academic career began in 1937, and he later held the chair of History of Medieval and Modern Art in various Italian universities: Bologna, Venice and Padua.

Pallucchini curated the exhibition Five centuries of Venetian painting set up in 1945 at the Procuratie Nuove in Venice, considered a model for subsequent "regional reconnaissance" exhibitions organized throughout Italy. In 1947, Pallucchini founded the magazine Arte Veneta of which he also took over the direction. Pallucchini published numerous studies collected in books and magazines, even after ceasing his academic activity in 1979. Among his colleagues and friends were the art historians Giulio Carlo Argan, Lionello Venturi and Carlo Ludovico Ragghianti. Pallucchini is noted for putting forth and emphasizing of the theory that Giambattista Pittoni studied under Antonio Balestra that has now generally been discounted in the classical arts historical circles.

== Death ==
Pallucchini died on April 8, 1989, in Venice, Italy. His library and personal archive were donated to the University of Udine by his heirs, his daughters Vittoria and Teresa: the library in 1989 and personal archive in 2001. The material is preserved in the Special Collections Section of the university's Humanities Library.

== Administrative positions ==
- In 1939, Superintendent for the Venetian museums
- From 1939 to 1950, director of Fine Arts of the Municipality of Venice.
- From 1948 to 1954, secretary of the Venice Biennale.
- From 1958 to 1973, president of the Scientific Council of the Andrea Palladio International Center for Architectural Studies, of which he also edited the bulletin.
- Since 1968, national member of the Accademia dei Lincei, from which in 1964 he received the Minister Prize.
- In 1972, director of the Institute of Art History of the Giorgio Cini Foundation of Venice.

== Select bibliography ==
- Venetian painting of the sixteenth century (in 2 volumes, 1944)
- The Youth of Tintoretto (1950)
- Piazzetta (1956)
- Giovanni Bellini (1959)
- Venetian painting of the 18th century (1960)
- Venetian painting of the 17th century (1981)

== Bibliography ==
- Mirella Levi d'Ancona; Francesca d'Arcais; Elena Bassi; Sylvie Béguin; Franco Bernabei (1979). Alfieri; Electa (eds.). Art history magazine dedicated to Rodolfo's seventieth birthday Pallucchini. Venetian art (n. 32). Vol. 2 vols. p. 718. OCLC 9154285.
- Claudio Lorenzini, ed. (2019). Rodolfo Pallucchini: stories, archives, critical perspectives. Udine: Forum. ISBN 978-88-328-3142-9.
