= Antonio Maria Zanetti =

Venetian artist, engraver, art critic, art dealer and connoisseur (1680–1767)

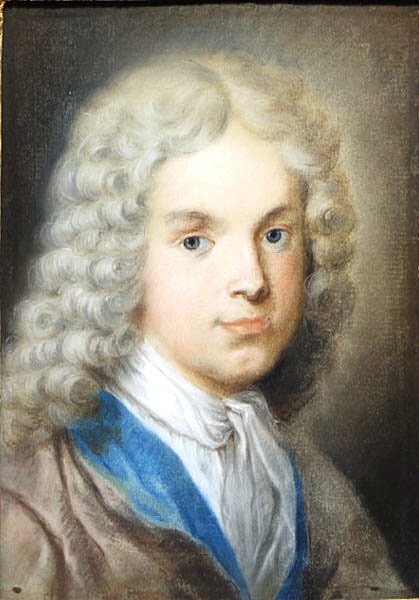
- Portrait of Antonio Maria Zanetti by Rosalba Carriera, Nationalmuseum, Stockholm
- Born: 20 February 1680; Venice, Republic of Venice
- Died: 31 December 1767; Venice, Republic of Venice
- Occupations: Artist, critic, collector, copper engraver, xylographer, art collector, etcher

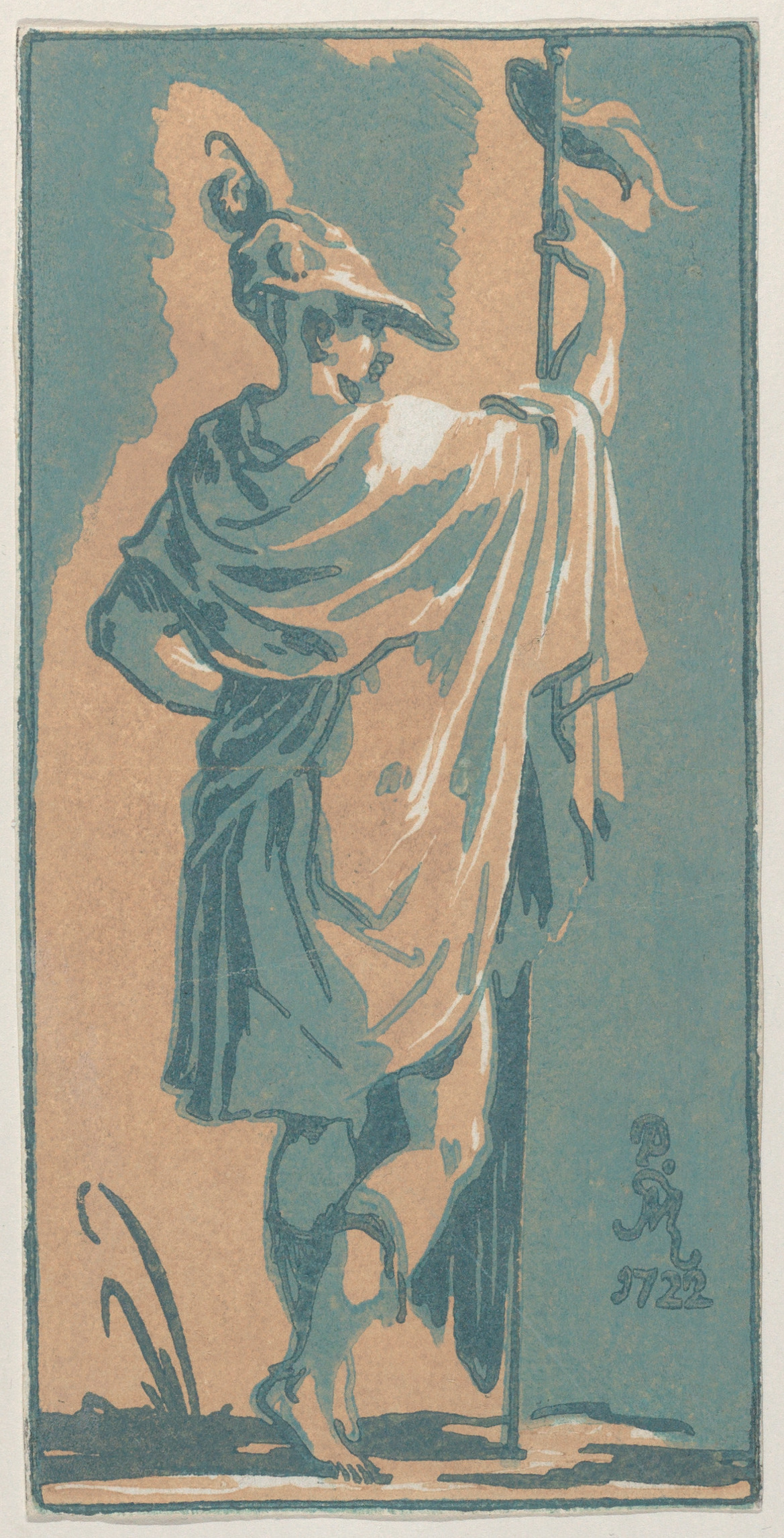
The Apostle Saint James, chiaroscuro woodcut

Count Anton[io] Maria Zanetti (1680–1767) was a Venetian artist, engraver, art critic, art dealer and connoisseur. He formed a collection of engraved gems, of which he published a lavish catalogue.

== Life ==
Zanetti spent his early manhood making wise investments in marine insurance, accumulating sufficient capital to support his true vocation, as a writer and artist, and as an art dealer, doing much of his business with the English aristocrats who passed through Venice on the Grand Tour. He acted as paintings agent for Philippe d'Orléans in forming the Orléans collection, Paris, and Joseph Wenzel I, Prince of Liechtenstein, in expanding the Liechtenstein collection, Vienna. Pierre Crozat, being in Venice in 1715, persuaded Zanetti and his protégé Rosalba Carriera to go to Paris. Zanetti also visited London, where he purchased Jan Petersen Zoomer's three large volumes containing 428 Rembrandt etchings in outstanding impressions of the various states.

He formed a collection of engraved gems, both Greco-Roman and modern, of which he published a lavish catalogue, in the form of A.F. Gori's Le gemme antiche di Anton Maria Zanetti (1750), illustrated with eighty plates of engravings from his own drawings. The drawings for the engravings, and many of his intaglios and cameos, are conserved in the Museo Correr, Venice. His prize piece, a black intaglio of Hadrian's favourite, Antinous, which he had pursued for years before acquiring it, was bought by George Spencer, 4th Duke of Marlborough and gained the sobriquet of the "Marlborough gem".

As a printmaker, Zanetti advanced the art of the Chiaroscuro woodcut, producing many prints after paintings by Parmigianino, Tintoretto and others.

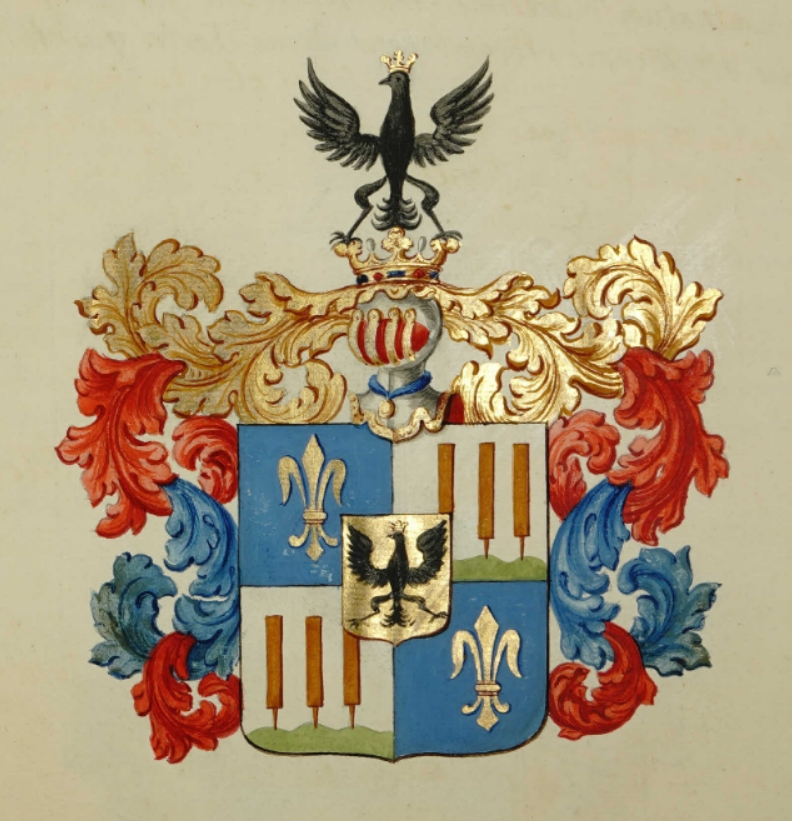
The Dano-Norwegian coat of arms offered by Frederick V and rejected by the Zanetti cousins.

On 4 November 1750, in response to Zanetti and his homonymous cousin having dedicated a book to his father Christian VI, King Frederick V of Denmark and Norway awarded each of them a gold medal adorned with diamonds, and also offered noble status, along with a grant of arms, in Denmark and Norway. However, learning of the fees involved, the Zanetti cousins returned the letters patent to Copenhagen, explaining that they didn't see themselves served with other nobility than the one that the emperor had granted to their ancestors.
