= The Death of Sophonisba (Pittoni) =

1716–1720 painting by Giambatista Pittoni

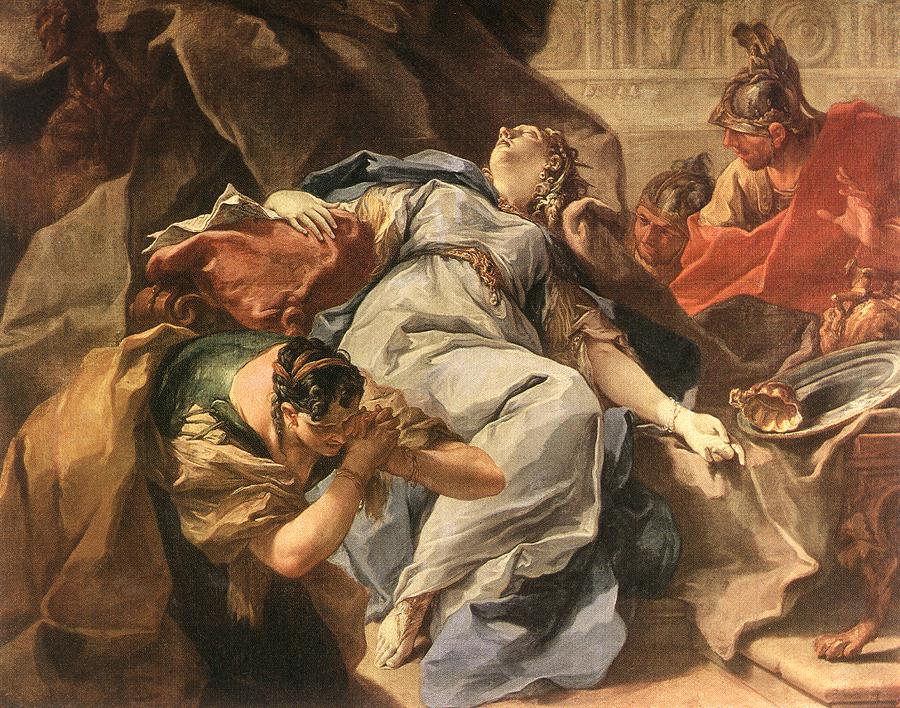
- Artist: Giovanni Battista Pittoni
- Year: 1716.1720
- Medium: Oil on canvas
- Dimensions: 165 cm × 214 cm (65 in × 84 in)
- Location: Pushkin Museum, Moscow

The Death of Sophonisba is an oil on canvas painting of by Italian painter Giambattista Pittoni, from 1716-1720. It depicts the episode of the suicide of Sophonisba. It is held at the Pushkin Museum, in Moscow.

== History ==
It was created originally in Venice - a sketch or smaller copy was bought by the Gemäldegalerie Alte Meister in 1723. It was bought for the Hermitage Museum in 1773 by the court cellist G. Dal Olio, then placed in the Tauride Palace. It was auctioned by Tsar Nicholas I in 1854 and bought by E.T. Zarudnoi-Cavos, then bought back by the Hermitage Museum, in St. Petersburg, in 1918. It was finally transferred to its present home at the Pushkin Museum, in Moscow, in 1930. Its pair a Semiramis by the same artist, was in the Nikaelov collection in Paris before being bought by the Pushkin Museum in 1853.

== Bibliography ==
- (in Italian) Antichità viva, Volume 32, Edam, 1993
- (in Italian) Franca Zava Boccazzi, Giambattista Pittoni, ed. Alfieri, 1979
- (in Italian) N. Pozza, 'Saggi e memorie di storia dell'arte', Volume 21, Istituto di storia dell'arte (Fondazione "Giorgio Cini"), 1997
- (in Italian) F. Apolloni and M. Tazzoli, Antologia Di Belle Arti, 2000
