= Giambattista Pittoni =

Venetian painter (1687–1767)

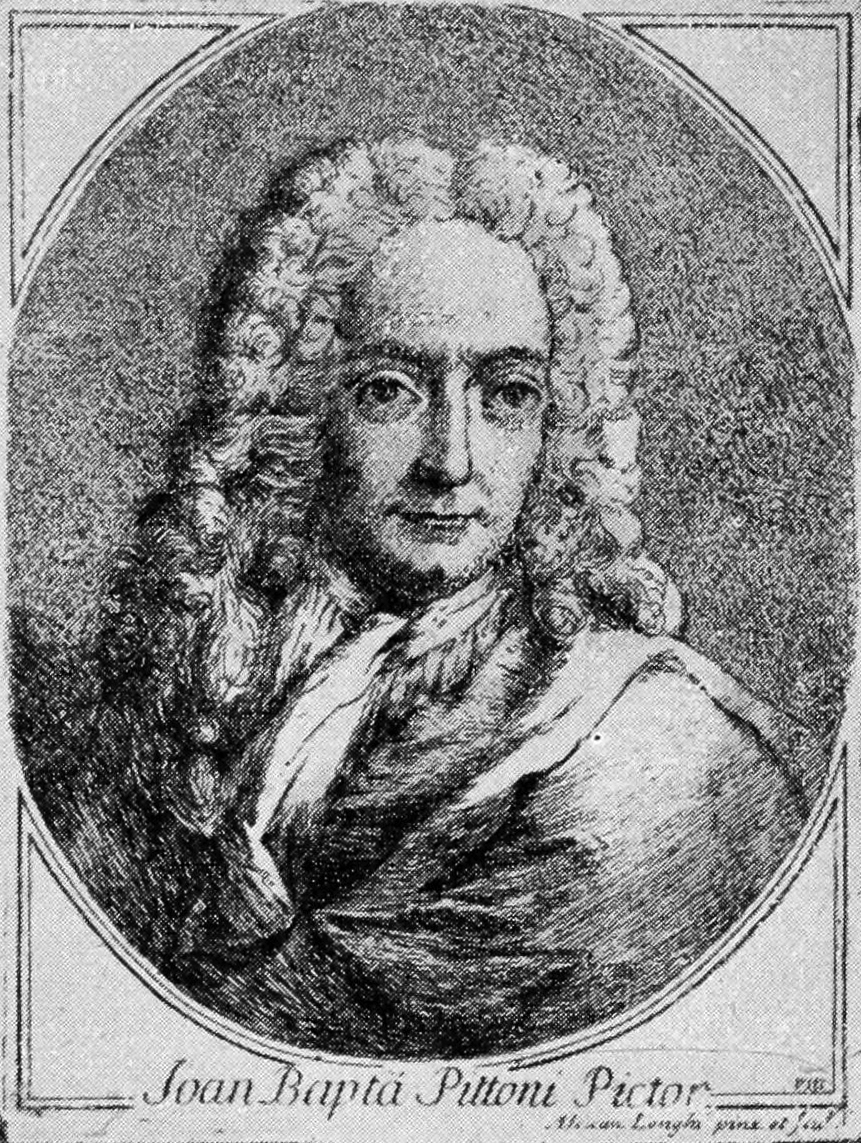
- Portrait of Pittoni by Alessandro Longhi, 1762
- Born: Giovanni Battista Pittoni; 6 June 1687; Venice, Republic of Venice (present-day Italy)
- Died: 6 November 1767; Venice, Republic of Venice
- Known for: painting
- Style: late-Baroque, Rococo

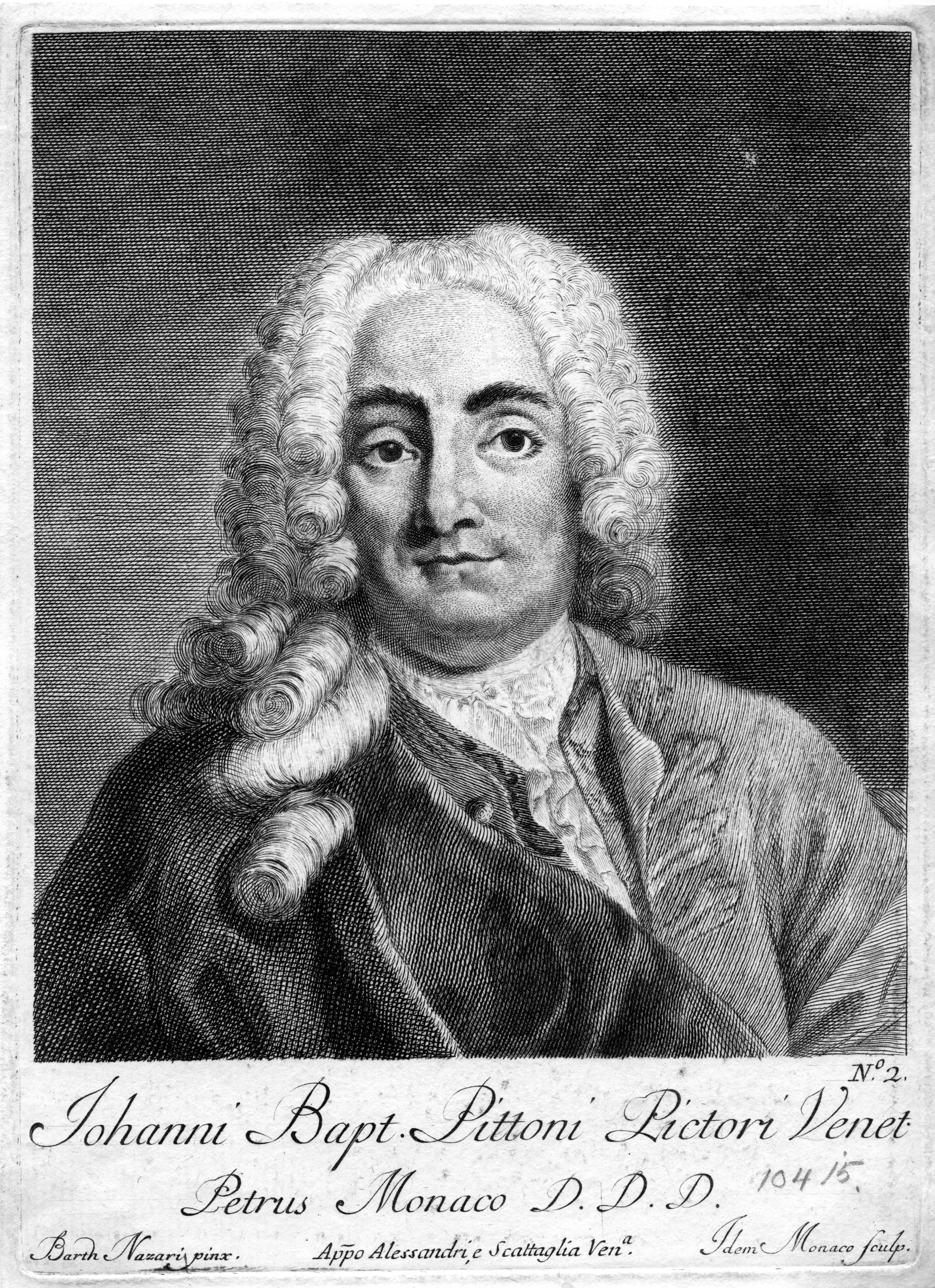
Portrait of Pittoni by Bartolomeo Nazari

Giambattista Pittoni or Giovanni Battista Pittoni (6 June 1687 – 6 November 1767) was a Venetian painter of the late Baroque or Rococo period. He was among the founders of the Academy of Fine Arts of Venice, of which in 1758 he became the second president, succeeding Tiepolo.

== Biography ==
Pittoni was born in Venice on 6 June 1687. He studied under his uncle Francesco Pittoni, a well-known but undistinguished painter of the Venetian Baroque; a Samson and Delilah at the Villa Querini in Visinale, near Pasiano di Pordenone, is signed by both painters. The theory of Rodolfo Pallucchini that Pittoni studied under Antonio Balestra is now generally discounted.

Pittoni was unwilling to leave Venice and travelled little; although he received many foreign commissions, no journey in connection with any of them is documented, while from 1720 onwards records show that he was in Venice in every year. However, in 1720 he may have travelled to France with his uncle Francesco, together with Rosalba Carriera, Antonio Pellegrini and Anton Maria Zanetti. His change of style from a heavy Baroque to a lighter and more delicate Rococo manner dates from about this time; some older writers have attributed this change to an indirect French influence, perhaps through Pellegrini or through Sebastiano Ricci.

Pittoni joined the Fraglia dei Pittori Veneziani, the Venetian guild of painters, in 1716. From, probably, the same year until his death he was a member of the Collegio dei Pittori, of which he became prior in 1729. He was elected to the Accademia Clementina of Bologna in 1727. In 1750 he was one of the forty-six founding members of the Veneta Pubblica Accademia di Pittura, Scultura e Architettura, which later became the Accademia di Belle Arti di Venezia; from 1758 to 1760 he succeeded Tiepolo as president of the academy, and was elected for a second term in 1763–64.

Pittoni died in Venice on 6 November 1767. His tomb is in the church of San Giacomo dell'Orio, Venice.

== Works ==
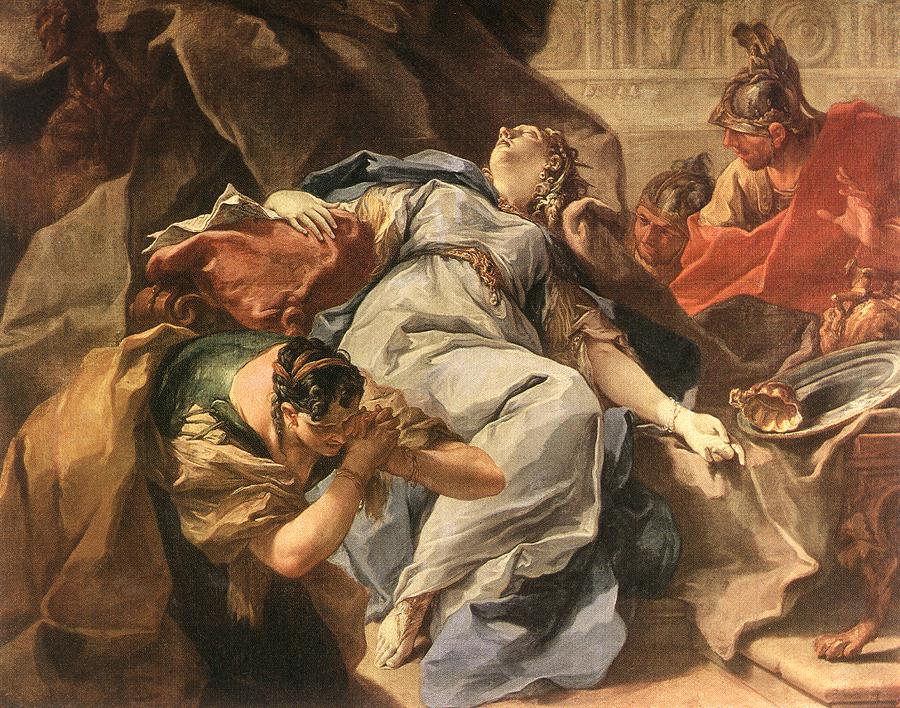
The Death of Sophonisba in the Pushkin Museum in Moscow

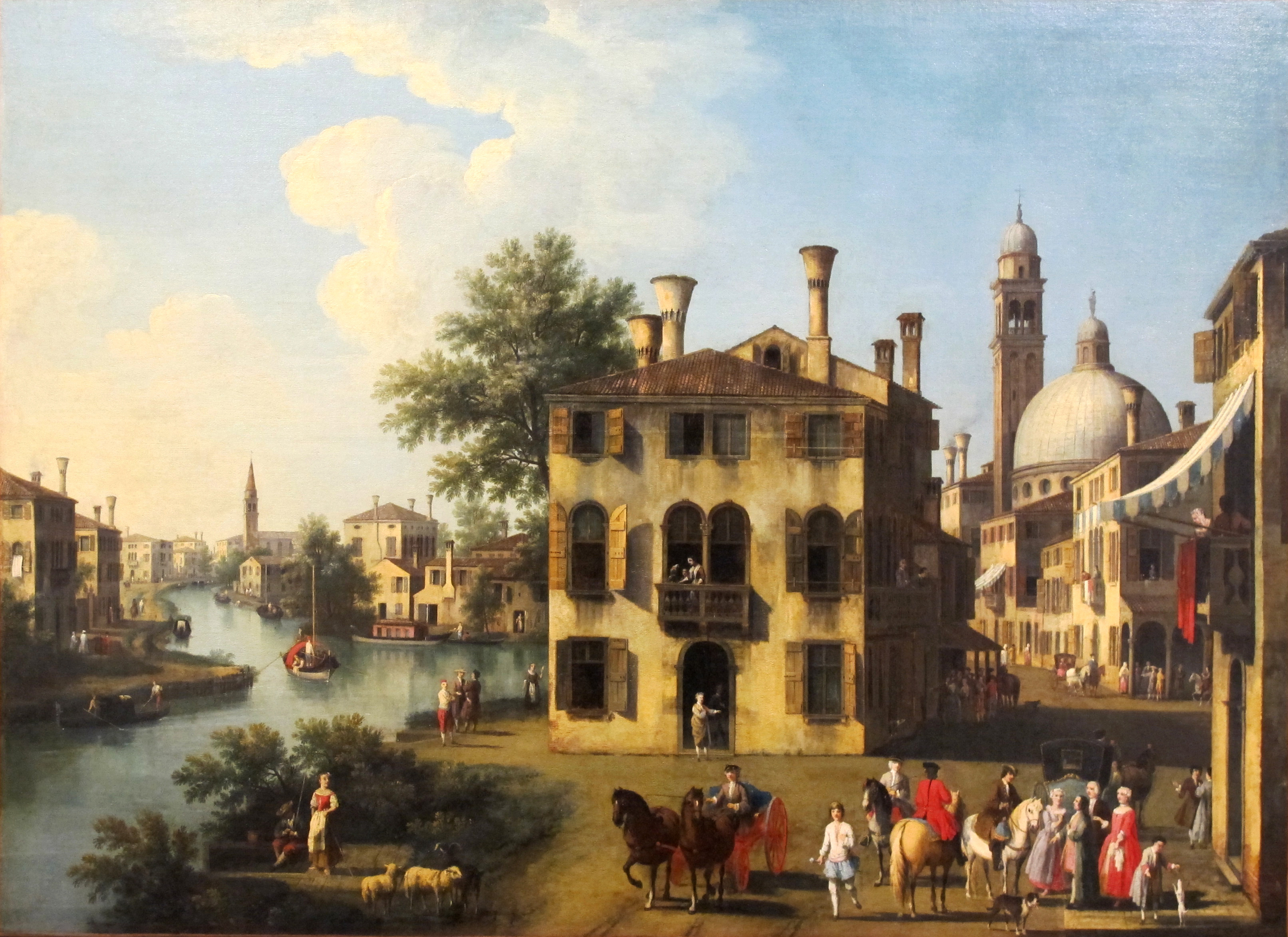
View of the Brenta, near Dolo, in the Metropolitan Museum of Art in New York City.

The catalogue raisonné by Franca Zava Boccazzi of Pittoni's paintings lists 247 extant and 117 lost, missing or destroyed works. The catalogue raisonné by Alice Binion of his drawings includes 304 items.

== Patronage and reception ==
Pittoni had a high reputation during his lifetime, both within the Italian peninsula and elsewhere in Europe. Among his foreign patrons were Augustus II of Poland (a Death of Agrippina and a Death of Seneca, circa 1713, formerly in Dresden, now destroyed); an unknown patron who in the 1730s bought five altarpieces for St. Mary's Church, Kraków; Clemens August of Bavaria (St. Elizabeth Distributing Alms to the Poor, 1734, for the castle of Bad Mergentheim); Wilhelmine Amalia of Brunswick-Lüneburg, who at about the same time commissioned an Education of the Virgin and a St. John Nepomuk for the chapel of Schloss Schönbrunn in Vienna; Philip V of Spain, who in 1735 commissioned a Triumphal Entry of Alexander into Babylonia for the Palacio Real de La Granja de San Ildefonso; and Augustus III of Poland, who through Francesco Algarotti commissioned a Crassus in the Sanctuary of the Temple of Jerusalem in 1743.

He was also much in demand in Italy, and supplied altarpieces for churches in Bergamo, Brescia, Milan, Padova, Verona and Vicenza. He was a skillful restorer of older paintings; he was often selected as restorer or inspector of the quadri pubblici, the state-owned paintings of the Serenissima. He sold nine paintings to the soldier-turned-collector Johann Matthias von der Schulenburg, but also advised him both on art and on art restoration. Pittoni was successful, well liked and well respected.

His reputation rapidly faded after his death, and by the end of the eighteenth century he was totally forgotten. Interest in him was revived in the twentieth century by the publications of Laura Coggiola Pittoni, beginning with Dei Pittoni, Artisti Veneti in 1907.
