= Baroni =

Baroni is a surname of Italian origin. It may refer to:

- Alessandro Baroni (born 1999), Dominican footballer
- Alex Baroni (1966–2002), Italian singer
- Angela Baroni (born 1979), Italian sailor
- Angelo Baroni (1553–1612), Italian Catholic priest
- Anna Lisa Baroni (born 1959), Italian politician
- Antonio Baroni (1678–1746), Italian painter
- Bill Baroni (born 1971), American Republican Party politician
- Cristian Oliveira Baroni (born 1983), Brazilian footballer
- Daniel Baroni (born 1980), Brazilian footballer
- Danilo Baroni (1922–2014), Argentine lawyer and politician
- Enrico Baroni (1892–1940), Italian WWII naval officer
- Francesca Baroni (born 1999), Italian professional racing cyclist
- Msgr. Geno Baroni (1930–1984), American Roman Catholic priest and social activist
- Gianmario Baroni (1910–1950), Italian ice hockey player
- Giuseppe Baroni (fl. 18th century), Italian engraver
- Juliana Baroni (born 1978), Brazilian actress
- Kaspar Anton von Baroni-Cavalcabo (1682–1759), Italian painter
- Leonora Baroni (1611–1670), Italian singer, musician, and composer
- Lorenzo Baroni (born 1990), Italian motorcycle racer
- Marco Baroni (born 1963), Italian footballer and manager
- Mario Baroni (1927–1994), Italian racing cyclist
- Mirjana Lučić-Baroni (born 1982), Croatian tennis player
- Nello Baroni (1906–1958), Italian architect
- Phil Baroni (born 1976), American mixed martial arts fighter
- Pierre Baroni (1955–2021), Australian artist, musician and radio broadcaster
- Rafaela Baroni (1935–2021), Venezuelan sculptor and poet
- Raphaël Baroni (born 1970), Swiss narratologist
- Riccardo Baroni (born 1998), Italian professional footballer
- Ronald Baroni (born 1968), Peruvian footballer
- Siro Baroni (1678–1746), Italian painter
- Tomás Baroni (born 1995), Argentine professional footballer
- Valeria Baroni (born 1989), Argentine actress, singer and dancer
- Vittore Baroni (born 1956), Italian artist and art critic
- Wellington Baroni (born 1989), Brazilian footballer
