= Giovanni Marco Pitteri =

Italian engraver

- Self-portrait
- Born: 24 May 1702; Venice, Republic of Venice
- Died: 4 August 1786 (aged 84); Venice, Republic of Venice
- Education: Giuseppe Baroni
- Occupation: Engraver
- Movement: Baroque

Giovanni Marco Pitteri (24 May 1702 – 4 August 1786) was an Italian engraver of the late Baroque period in his native Venice. He engraved densely incised portraits with shading of almost photographic quality.

== Biography ==
=== Early life ===
Giovanni Marco Pitteri was born in Venice on 24 May 1702. He learned his skill in engraving from Giuseppe Baroni after studying drawing in the studio of Giovanni Battista Piazzetta. His first dated print is Religion Crushing Heresy (1724), after Piazzetta, while an engraved portrait of the Chancellor Giovanni Maria Vincenti, after Pietro Uberti, dates from 1725.

Early in his career he was attracted to the technique made famous by Claude Mellan: the use of repeated parallel lines that are either more or less emphasized according to whether they represent shaded or lighted areas, replacing the function of cross-hatching. In Venice this technique was also employed by Carlo Orsolini (1710–80) and Giovanni Antonio Faldoni.

=== Collaboration with Piazzetta ===
In 1735 Pitteri married Prudenza Astori, herself an able letter engraver, and in the same year he engraved the famous portrait, after Carlo Francesco Rusca (1696–1769), of Marshal Johann-Matthias Graf von Schulenburg, which achieved renown on account of the boldness of the new technique and the vigour of the stroke. Shortly afterwards he engraved the 37 copperplate prints for the little volume of the Beatae Mariae Virginis officium, published by Pasquali in 1740, containing 16 original prints and 21 prints after Piazzetta. From this time collaboration between painter and engraver became more intense, and Pitteri produced c. 140 prints after Piazzetta’s drawings.

In 1742 the splendid series of the Dodici apostoli, of which a small-format edition also exists, was published. The four large portraits of Goldoni, after Lorenzo Tiepolo, Piazzetta, Pitteri himself and Francesco Scipione Maffei, after Francesco Lorenzi, belong to the same period.

=== Collaboration with Longhi ===
After Piazzetta’s death in 1754, Pitteri engraved works of Pietro Longhi, producing prints of the series of the Seven Sacraments (Venice, Fond. Querini-Stampalia) and, a little later, six large prints of the Hunt in the Valley (Venice, Fond. Querini-Stampalia). In these engravings he refined his own technique, using very fine lines that move in the same direction, irrespective of changes of plane, to model figures and objects. This new technique is seen at its best in Child with a Pear, Child with a Dog and Young Girl with a Doughnut (all 1755–60). The 24 plates for the Studj di pittura già disegnati da Giambattista Piazzetta were published by Giambattista Albrizzi in 1760; the series also contains 24 studies engraved by Francesco Bartolozzi, mostly as simple outlines.

=== Later years and legacy ===
In the last phase of his activity Pitteri accentuated the delicacy of his engraving in order to achieve effects of subtle tonal variation and soft nuances of shade, as well as exceptional luminosity. Examples of this are the Coronation of the Poet, after Antonio Marinetti, called il Chiozzotto, the Venetian Saints and Blessed Ones, after Antonio Novelli, and the portraits of Carlo Goldoni, Flaminio Corner, after Giuseppe Angeli, Giorgio Pisani, after Boscherati, and the heads of Christ and the Virgin. His last dated copperplate engraving, Saint Teresa, after Cima da Conegliano, was made in 1781.

In all Pitteri produced about 450 copperplate engravings, predominantly of religious subjects or portraits. He was also active in the field of book illustration, and he produced 111 plates, including initials and decorative friezes, for the Opere di Virgilio (1757–65). He had a son, Felice, by whom a few prints of poor quality are known, and a number of followers, the best-known among them being Giovanni Cattini and Vincenzo Giaconi (1760–1829). One of his pupils was Giovanni Domenico Lorenzi.

== Prints ==
- Beatae Mariae Virginis officium (Venice, 1740);
- Dodici apostoli (Venice, 1742);
- Opere di Virgilio, 5 vols (The Hague, 1757–65);
- Studj di pittura già disegnati da Giambattista Piazzetta (Venice, 1760).

== Gallery ==
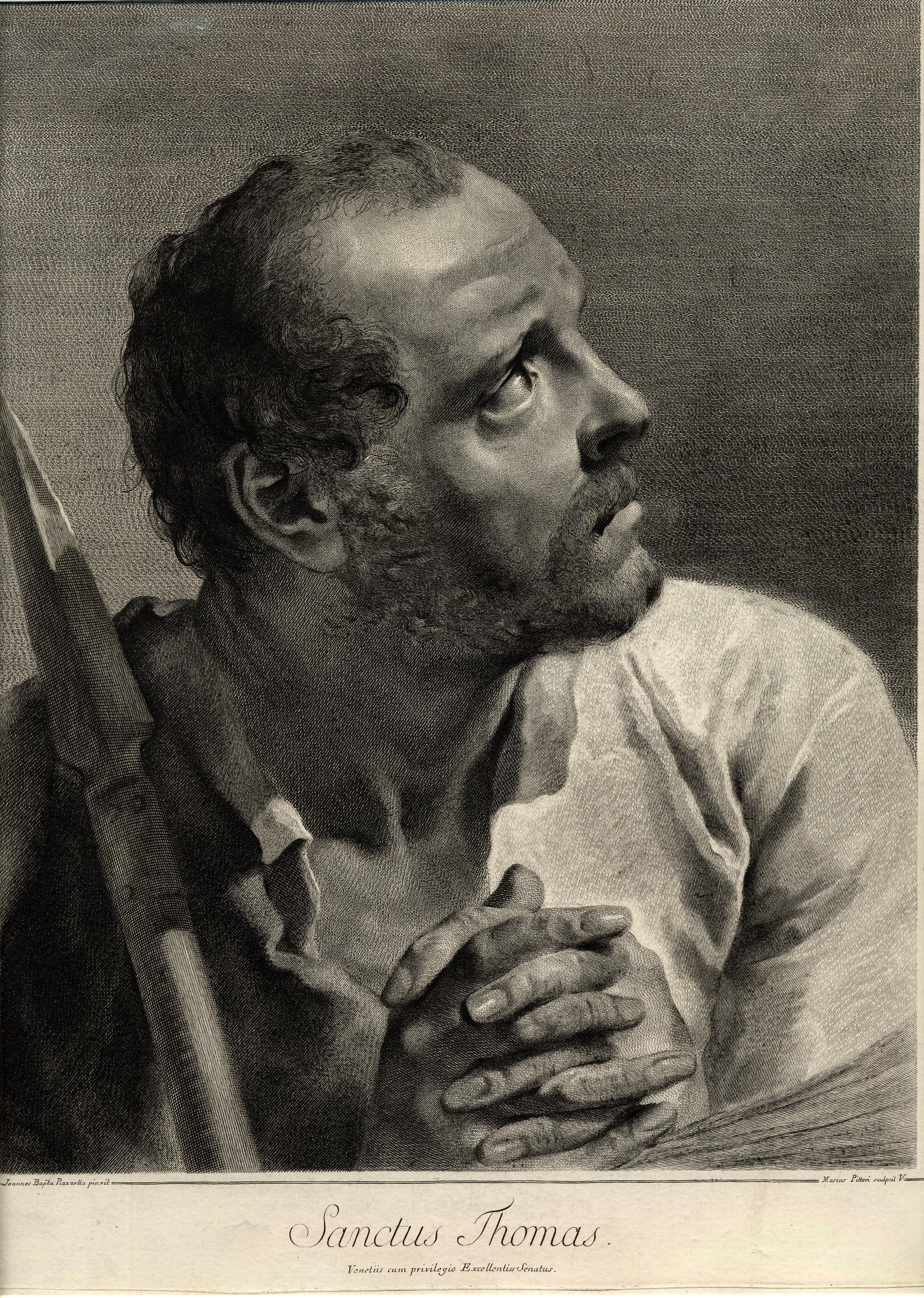
Thomas the Apostle

Bartholomew the Apostle

James the Less

Matthew the Apostle

Philip the Apostle

Saint Peter

Paul the Apostle

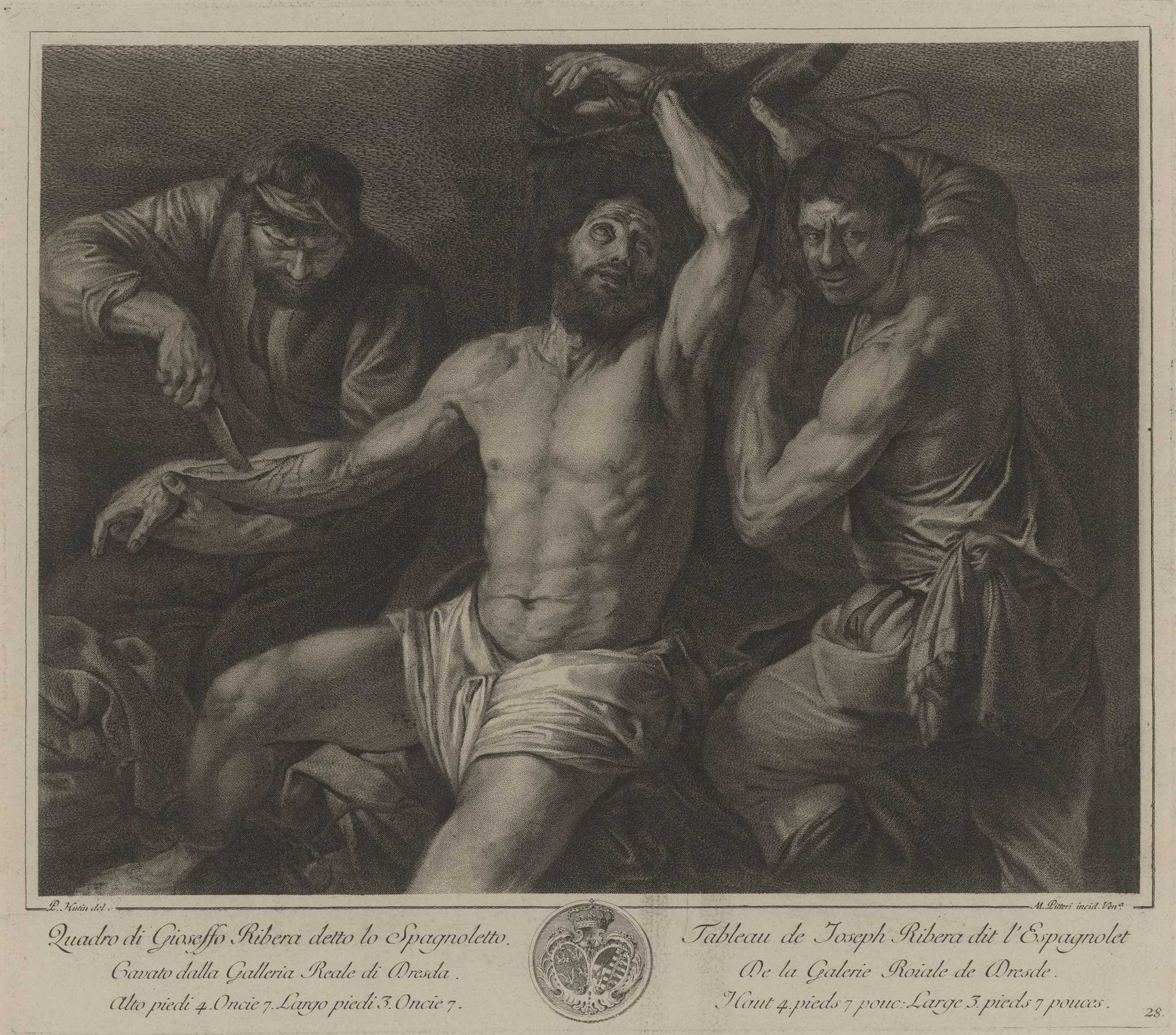
Martyrdom of Saint Bartholemew, after Ribera (1750, copper engraving)

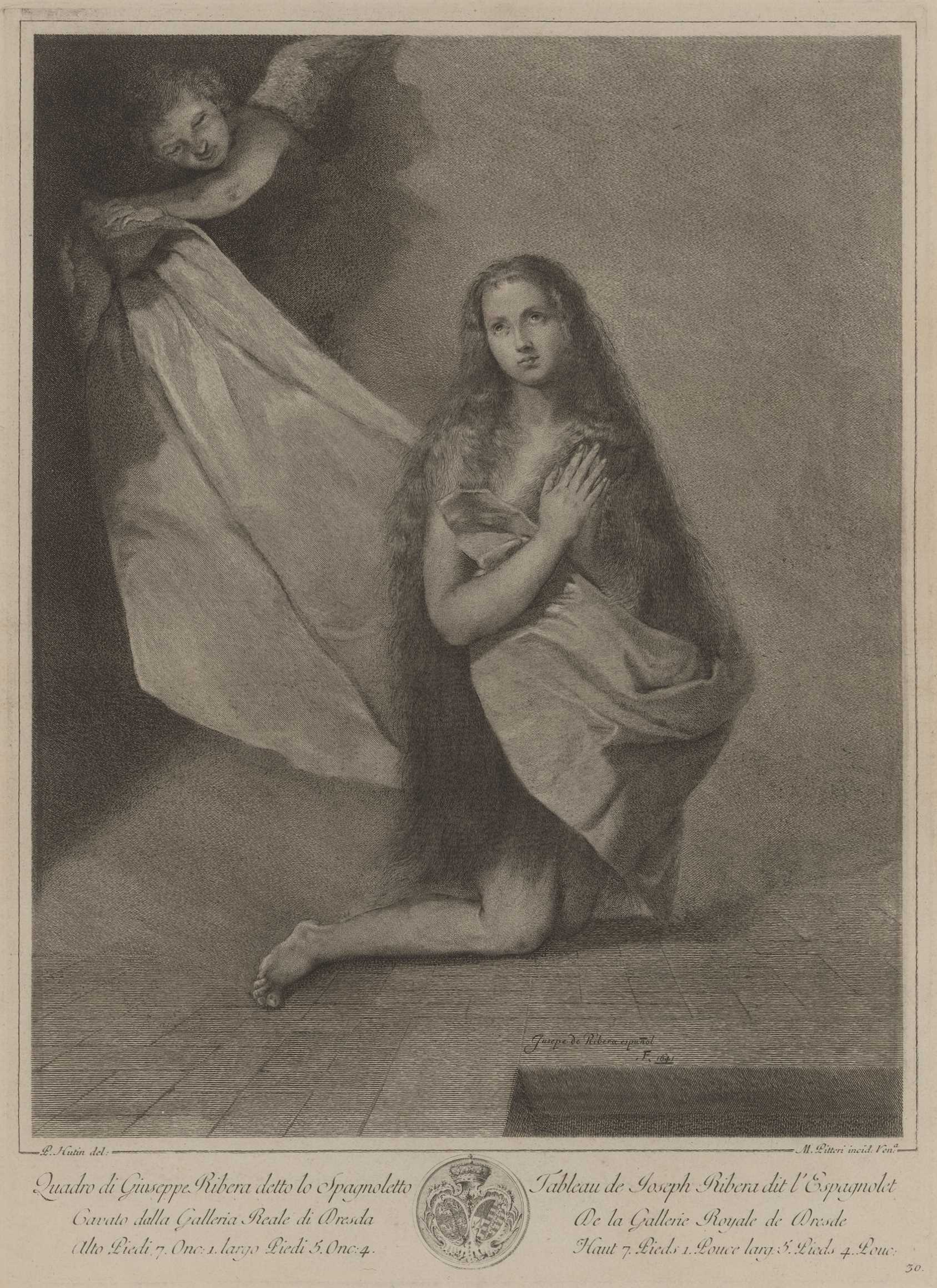
Saint Agnes, after Ribera (1750, copper engraving)

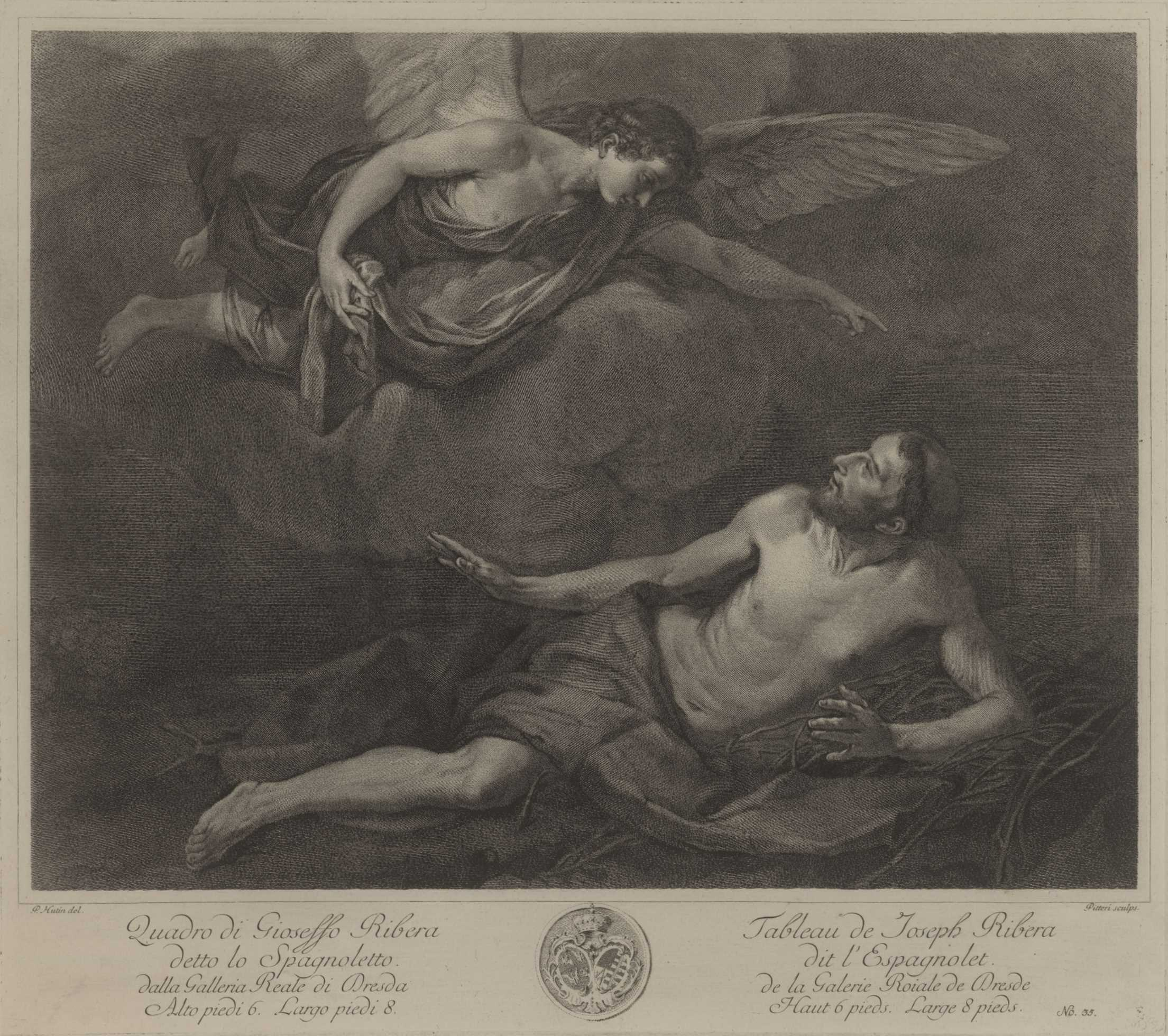
Saint Francis of Assisi, after Ribera (1750, copper engraving)

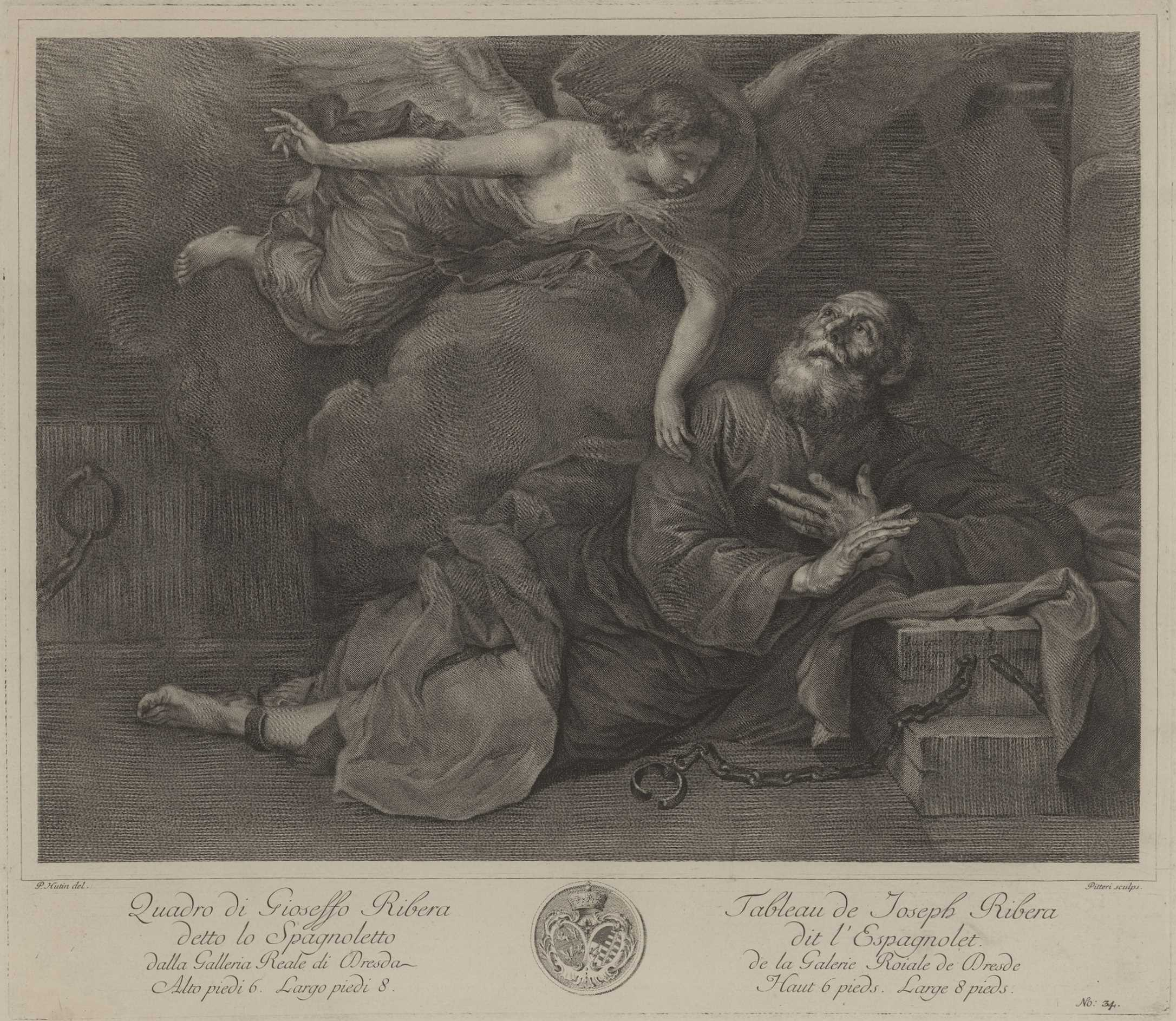
Liberation of Saint Peter, after Ribera (1750, copper engraving)
