= Francesco Polazzo =

Italian painter

Francesco Polazzo (1683–1753) was an Italian painter of the late-Baroque period, active mainly in Venice. He was a pupil of Giovanni Battista Piazzetta, and painted portraits and historical subjects, though better known as a restorer of pictures. Lanzi said of him that he softened down the style of Piazzetta with that of Ricci.

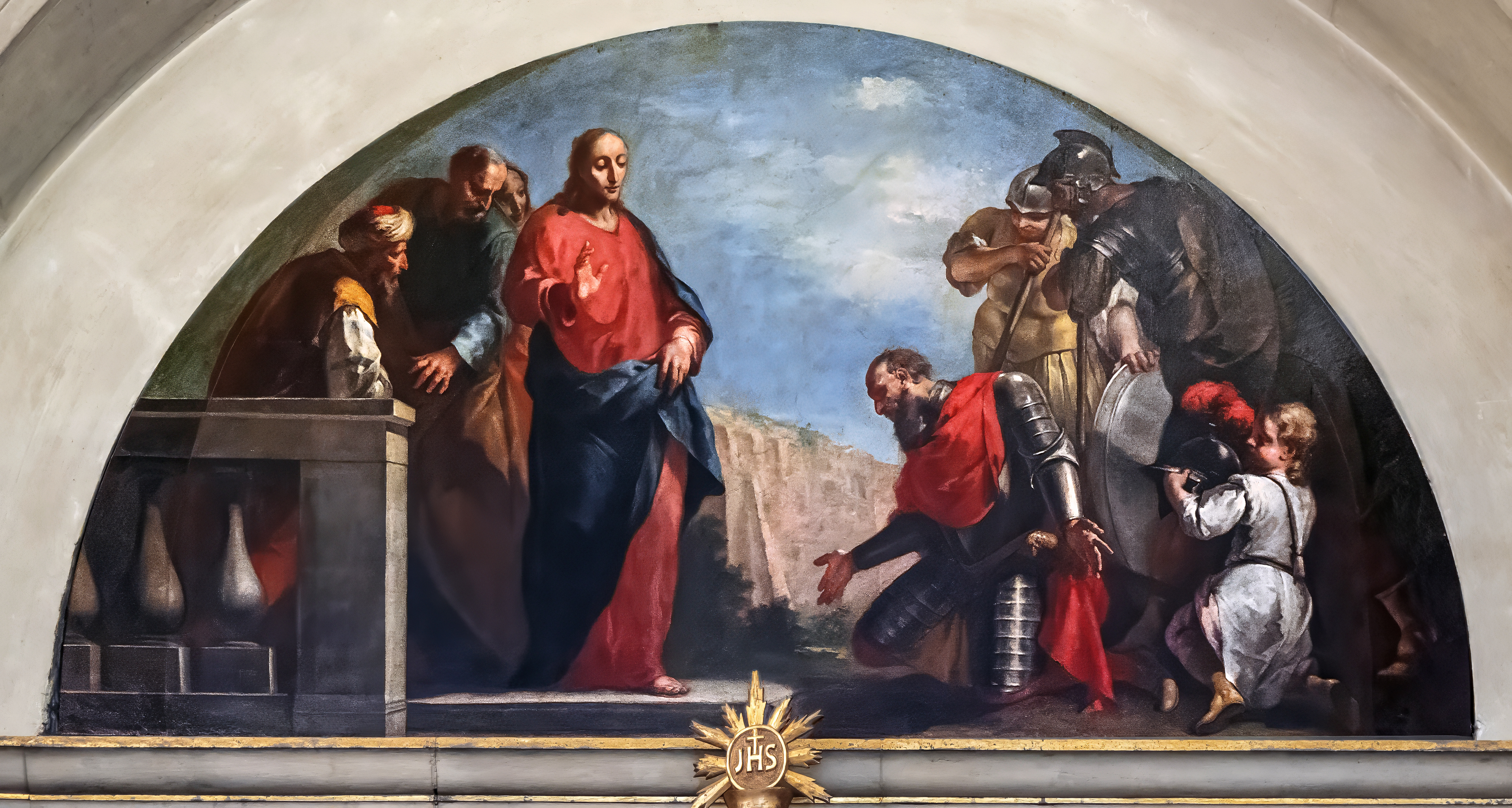
Christ and the Centurion San Trovaso (Venice)

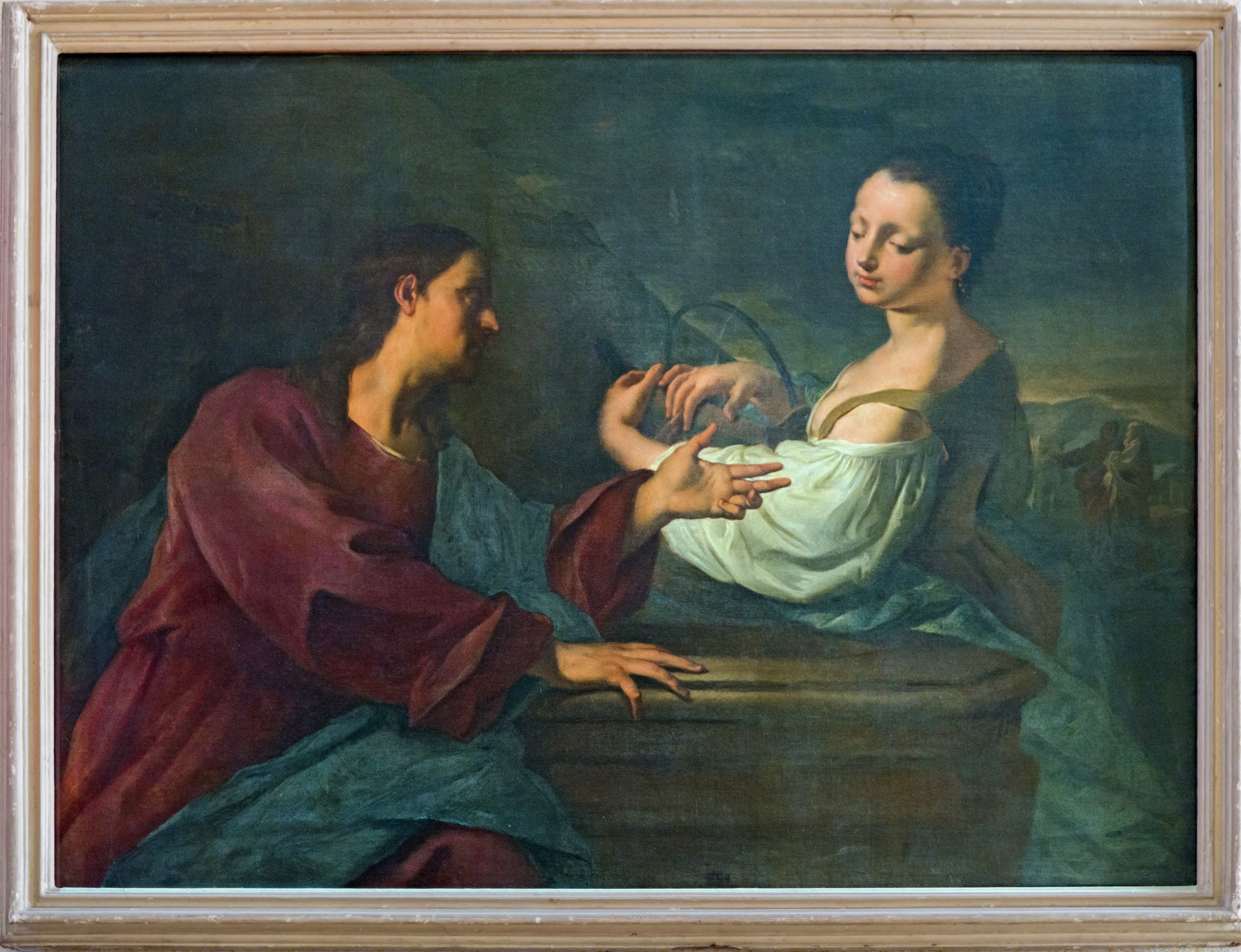
Rebecca at the Well with Eleaza San Francesco della Vigna

== Ceiling from palazzo nani in Ca'Rezzonico-museum ==
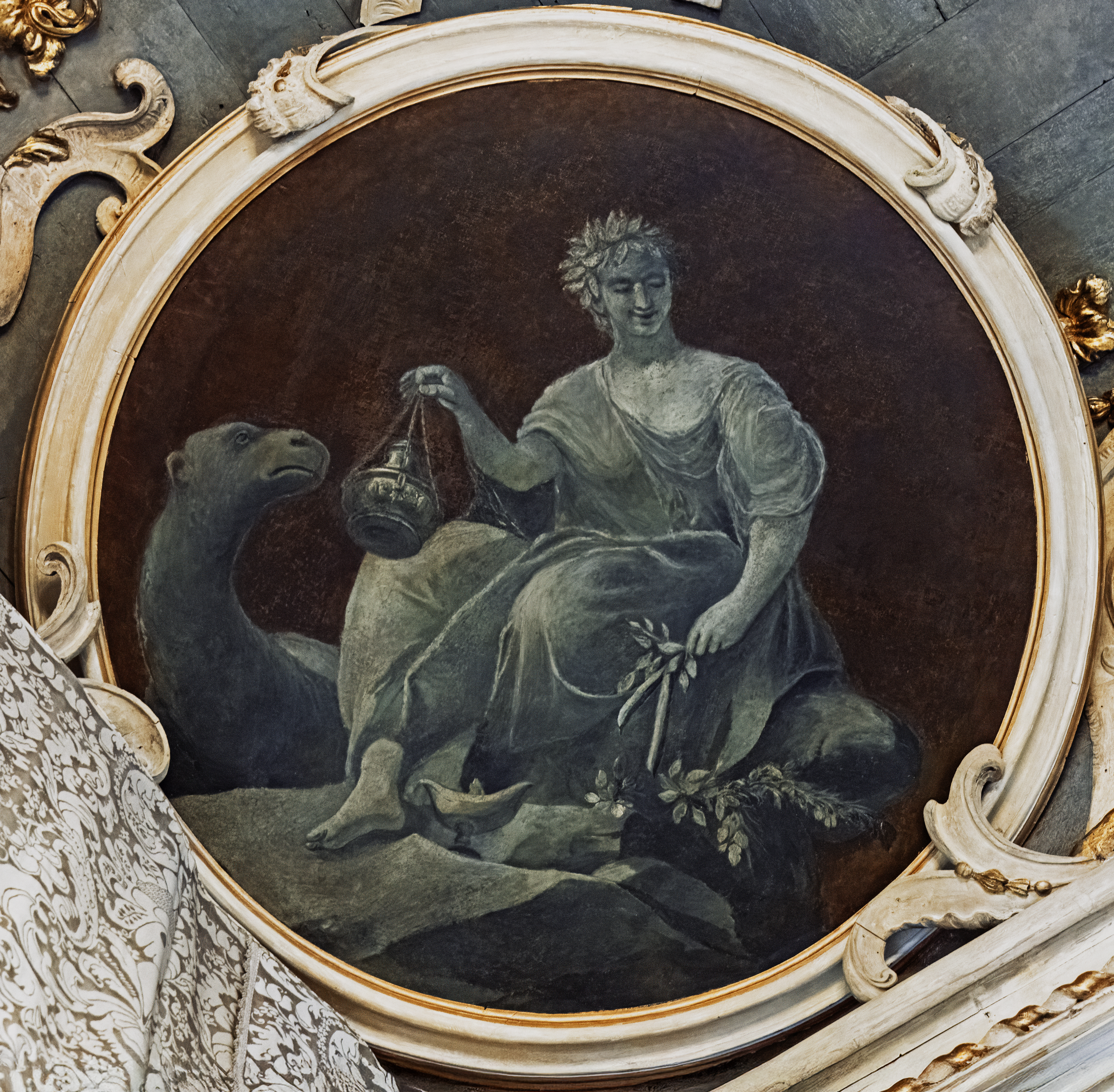
Africa

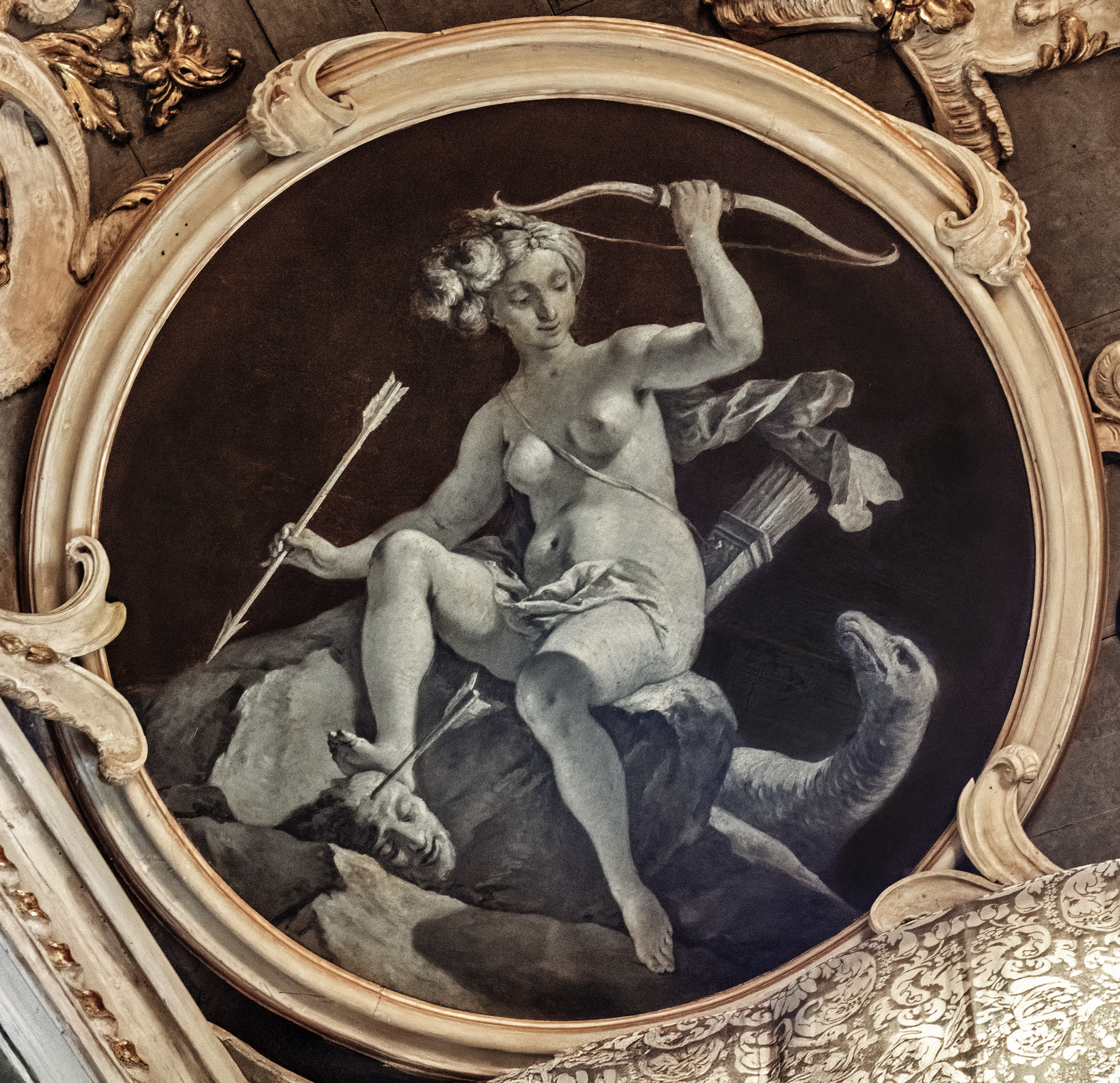
America

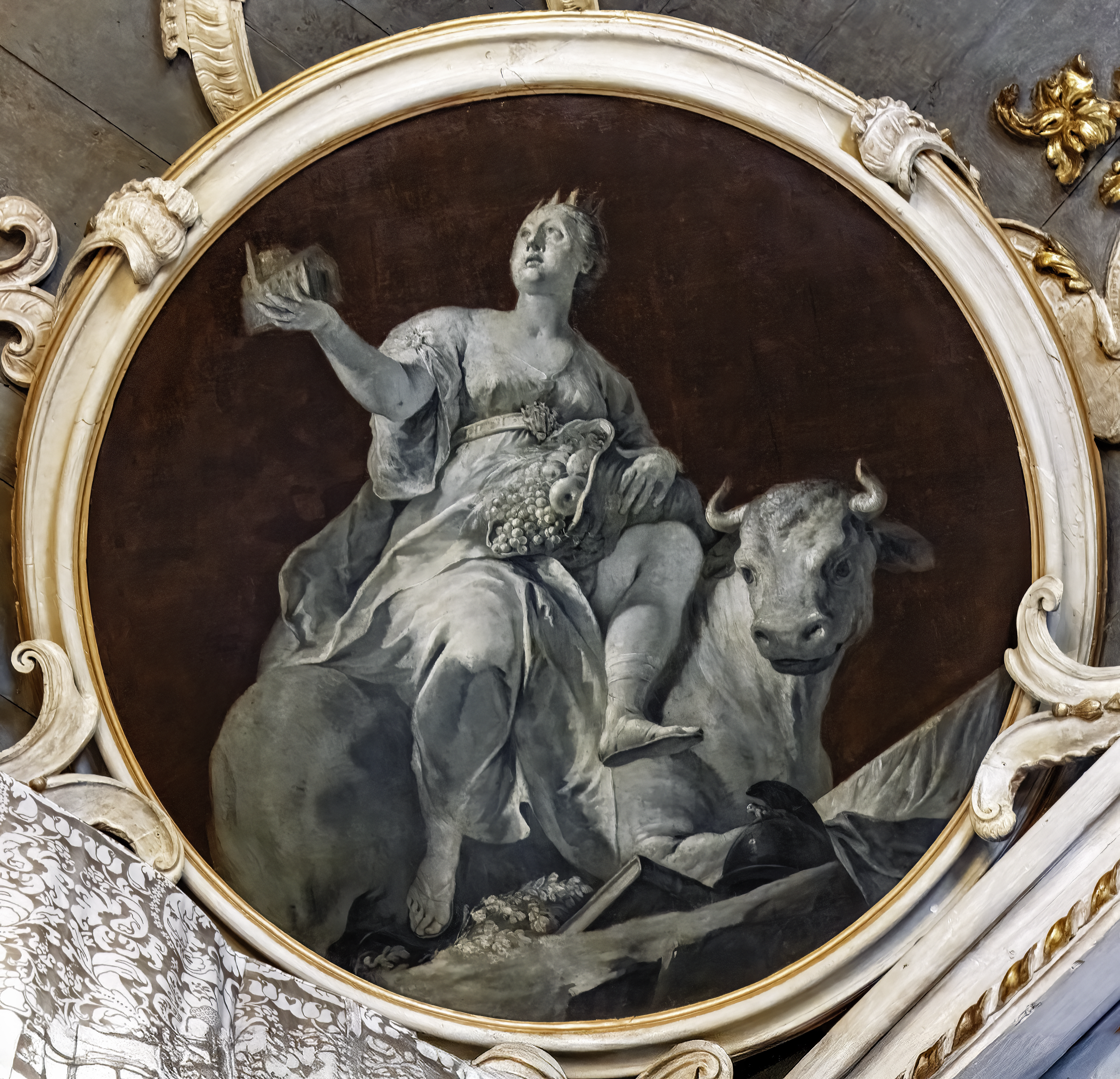
Europa

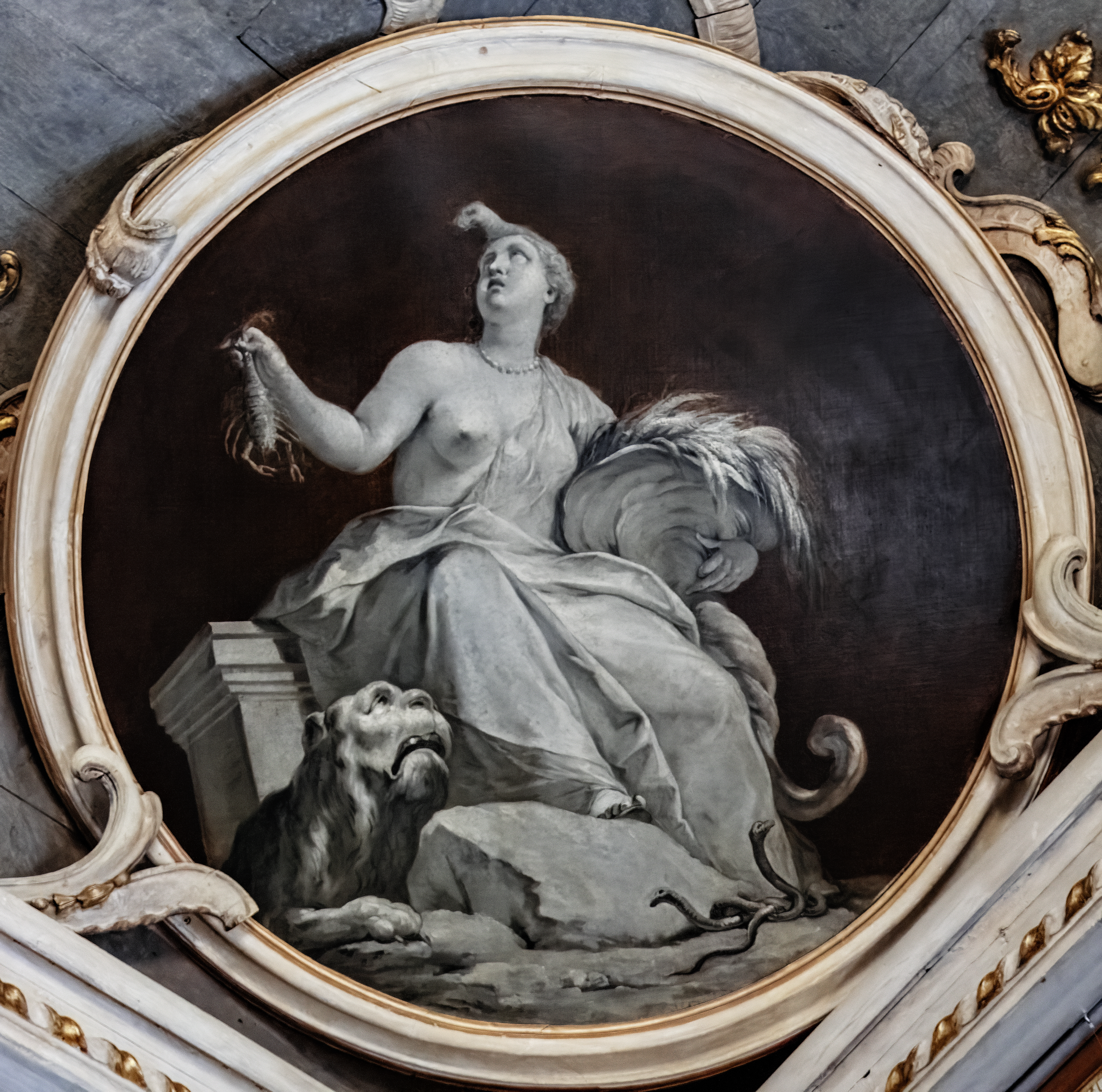
Asia
