= Giovanni Battista Piazzetta =

Italian painter (1682/1683–1754)

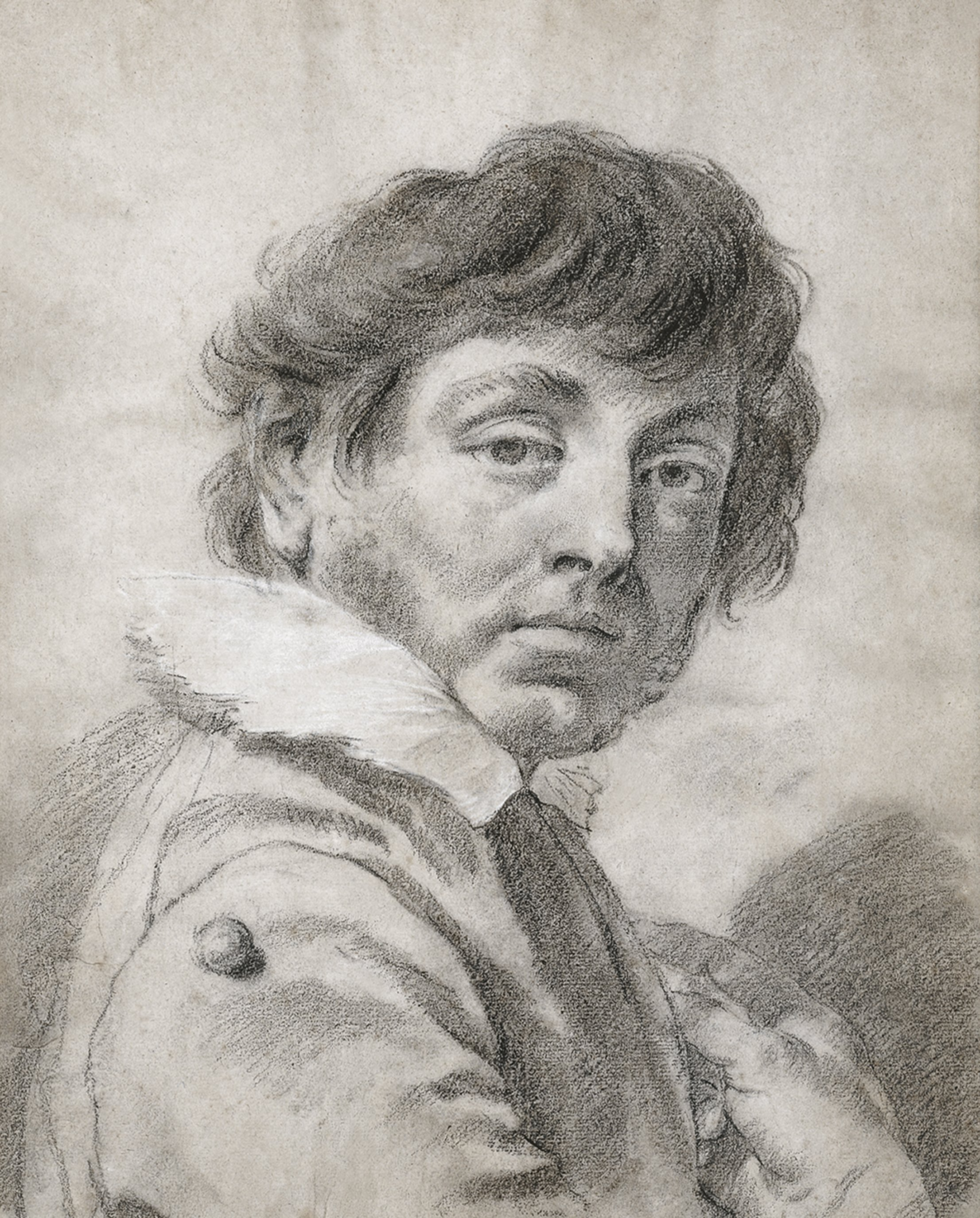
Self portrait (1730s), Charcoal heightened with White on green-grey paper. In the collection of the Thyssen-Bornemisza Museum, Madrid

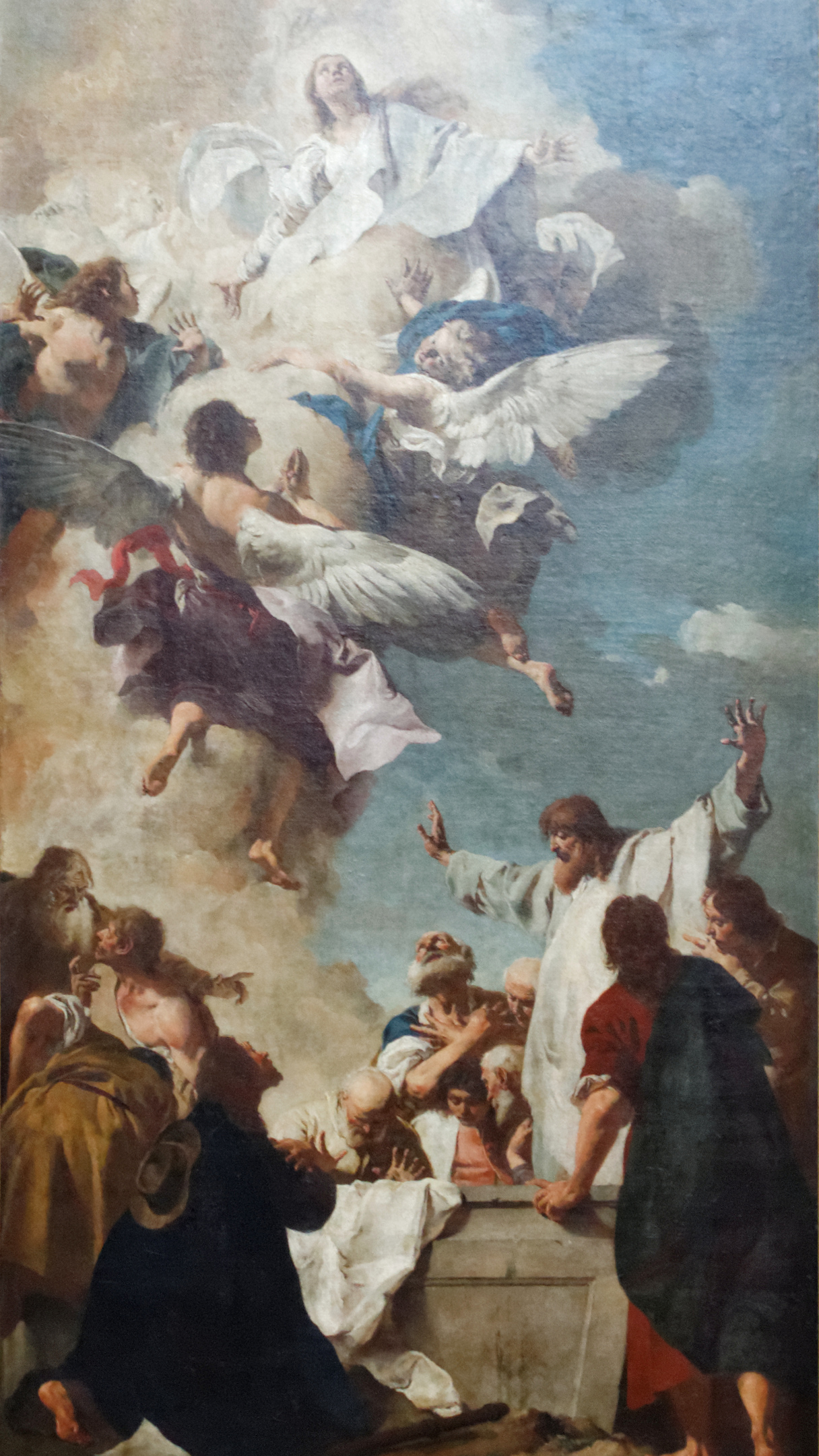
The Assumption of Mary (1735), oil on canvas. In the collection of the Louvre

Giovanni Battista Piazzetta (also called Giambattista Piazzetta or Giambattista Valentino Piazzetta) (February 13, 1682 or 1683 – April 28, 1754) was an Italian Rococo painter of religious subjects and genre scenes.

== Biography ==
Piazzetta was born in Venice, the son of a sculptor Giacomo Piazzetta, from whom he had early training in wood carving. Starting in 1697 he studied with the painter Antonio Molinari. By Piazzetta's account, he studied under Giuseppe Maria Crespi while living in Bologna in 1703–05, although there is no record by Crespi of formal tutelage. Thanks to Crespi, Carlo Cignani's influence reached Piazzetta. Piazzetta did find inspiration in Crespi's art, in which the chiaroscuro of Caravaggio was transformed into an idiom of graceful charm in his pictures of common folk. He was also greatly impressed by the altarpieces created by another Bolognese painter of a half-century earlier, Guercino.

Around 1710, he returned to Venice. There he won recognition as a leading artist despite his limited output and his unassuming nature, but he ultimately was less patronized, both in Venice and especially abroad, than two other eminent stars in Venetian late-Baroque/Rococo, Ricci and Tiepolo. Yet Piazzeta's range of topics was broader than that of these artists; Tiepolo, for example, never painted genre paintings and restricted himself to grand history and religious altarpieces. Ricci and Tiepolo had a luminous palette and facile ease that allowed them to carpet meters of ceiling with frescoes, although with a superficiality and glamor that is absent from Piazzetta's darker and more intimate depictions. Nonetheless, Tiepolo, who collaborated with Piazzetta on some projects, was greatly influenced by the older artist; in turn, the luminosity and brilliance of Tiepolo's palette influenced Piazzetta in his later years.

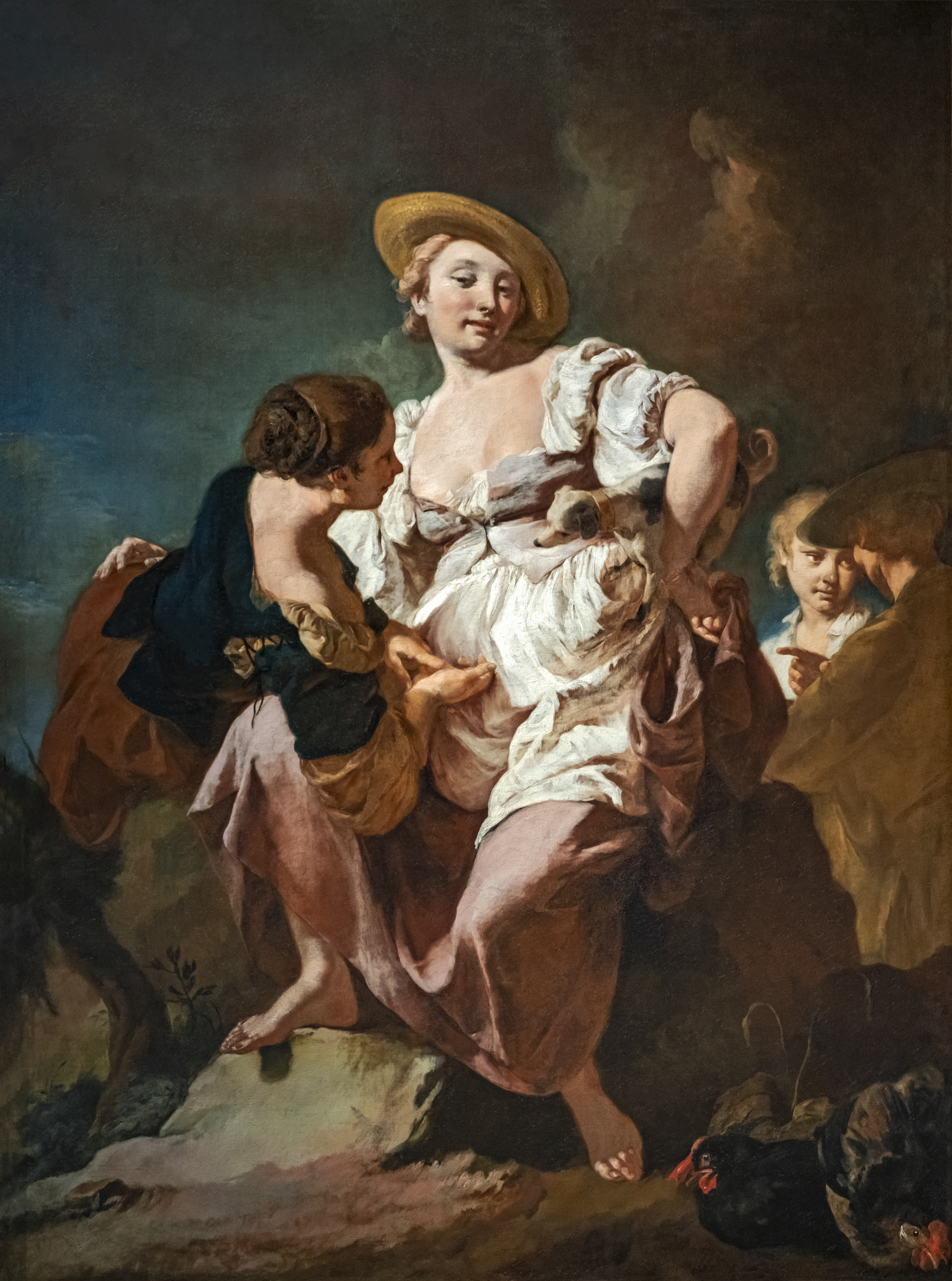
The Soothsayer, Accademia, Venice

Piazzetta created an art of warm, rich color and a mysterious poetry. He often depicted peasantry, even if often in a grand fashion. He was highly original in the intensity of color he sometimes used in his shadows, and in the otherworldly quality he gave to the light which throws part of a composition into relief. The gestures and glances of his protagonists hint at unseen dramas, as in one of his best-known paintings, The Soothsayer (1740, now in Gallerie dell'Accademia, Venice). He brought similar elusiveness to works of a religious nature, such as the Sotto in su Glory of St. Dominic in the Church of Santi Giovanni e Paolo.

Also notable are his many carefully rendered drawings of half-length figures or groups of heads. Usually in charcoal or black chalk with white heightening on gray paper, these are filled with the same spirit that animates his paintings, and were purchased by collectors as independent works. He also produced engravings.

In 1750 Piazzetta became the first director of the newly founded Accademia di Belle Arti di Venezia, and he devoted the last few years of his life to teaching. He was elected a member of the Bolognese Accademia Clementina in 1727. Among the painters in his studio were Domenico Maggiotto, Francesco Dagiu (il Capella), Johann Heinrich Tischbein, Egidio Dall'Oglio, and Antonio Marinetti. The engraver Marco Pitteri was affiliated with his studio, and engraved many of his works. Among younger painters who emulated his style are Giovanni Battista Pissati, Giulia Lama, Federico Bencovich, and Francesco Polazzo (1683–1753). He died in Venice on April 28, 1754.

== Selected works ==
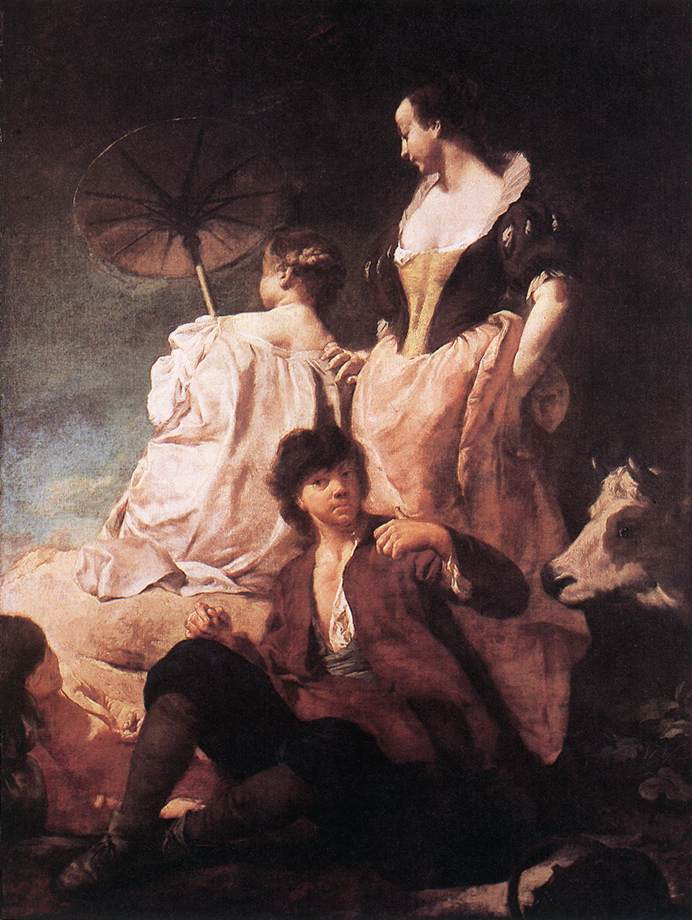
Idyll at Coast (c. 1741), Wallraf–Richartz Museum, Cologne

- St.James Led to Martyrdom (1717), San Stae, Venice.
- Madonna and child appearing to St. Philip Neri (1725-7)
- Glory of St.Dominic (1725–1727), Santi Giovanni e Paolo, Venice.
- Ecstasy of St. Francis (1732).
- Assumption (1735).
- St. Margaret of Cortona (1737), National Gallery of Art, Washington DC.
- Sacrifice of Isaac, (after 1735, unfinished).
- Rebecca at the well (c. 1740), Pinacoteca di Brera, Milan.
- Fortune Teller (1740).
- The Pastoral (1739–41).
- The Death of Darius (1746).
- Peasant Girl (1720–22).
- Portrait of Giulia Lama (c. 1715-1720), Thyssen-Bornemisza Museum, Madrid.
- The Sacrifice of Isaac (c. 1715), Thyssen-Bornemisza Museum, on loan at The MNAC, Barcelona.
- Portrait of a Young Woman in Profile with a Mask in her Right Hand (c. 1720-1730), Carmen Thyssen-Bornemisza Collection, on loan at The Thyssen-Bornemisza Museum, Madrid.

== Gallery ==
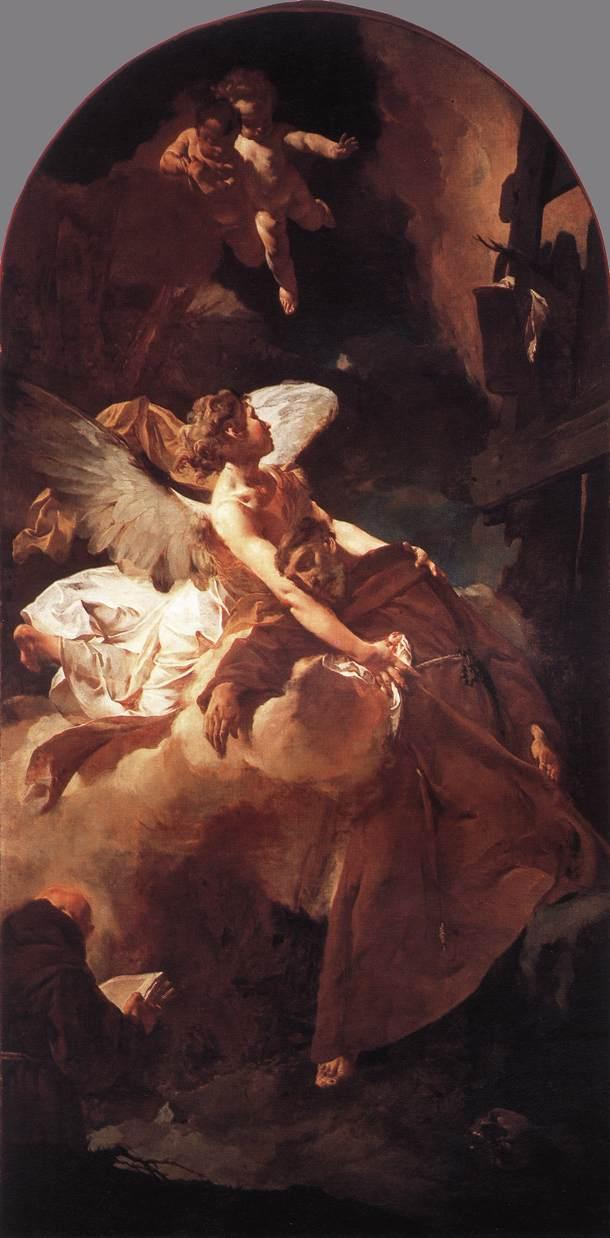
Ecstasy of St Francis, Palazzo Chiericati, Vicenza

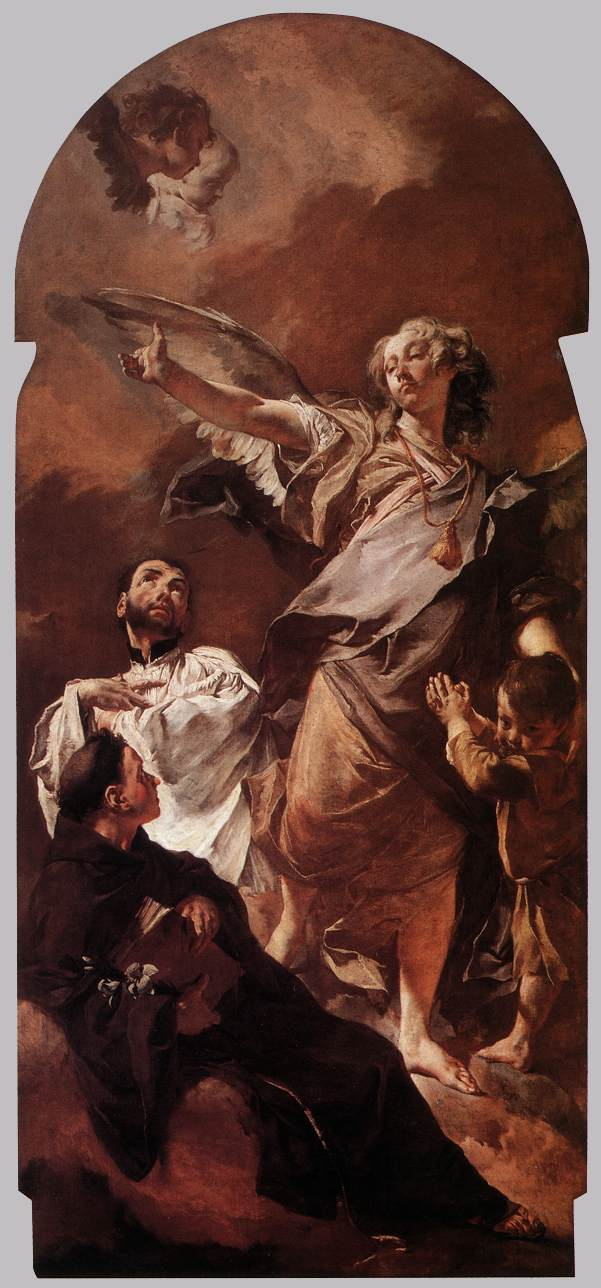
St Anthony of Padua, St Gaetano, and Guardian Angel, San Vidal, Venice

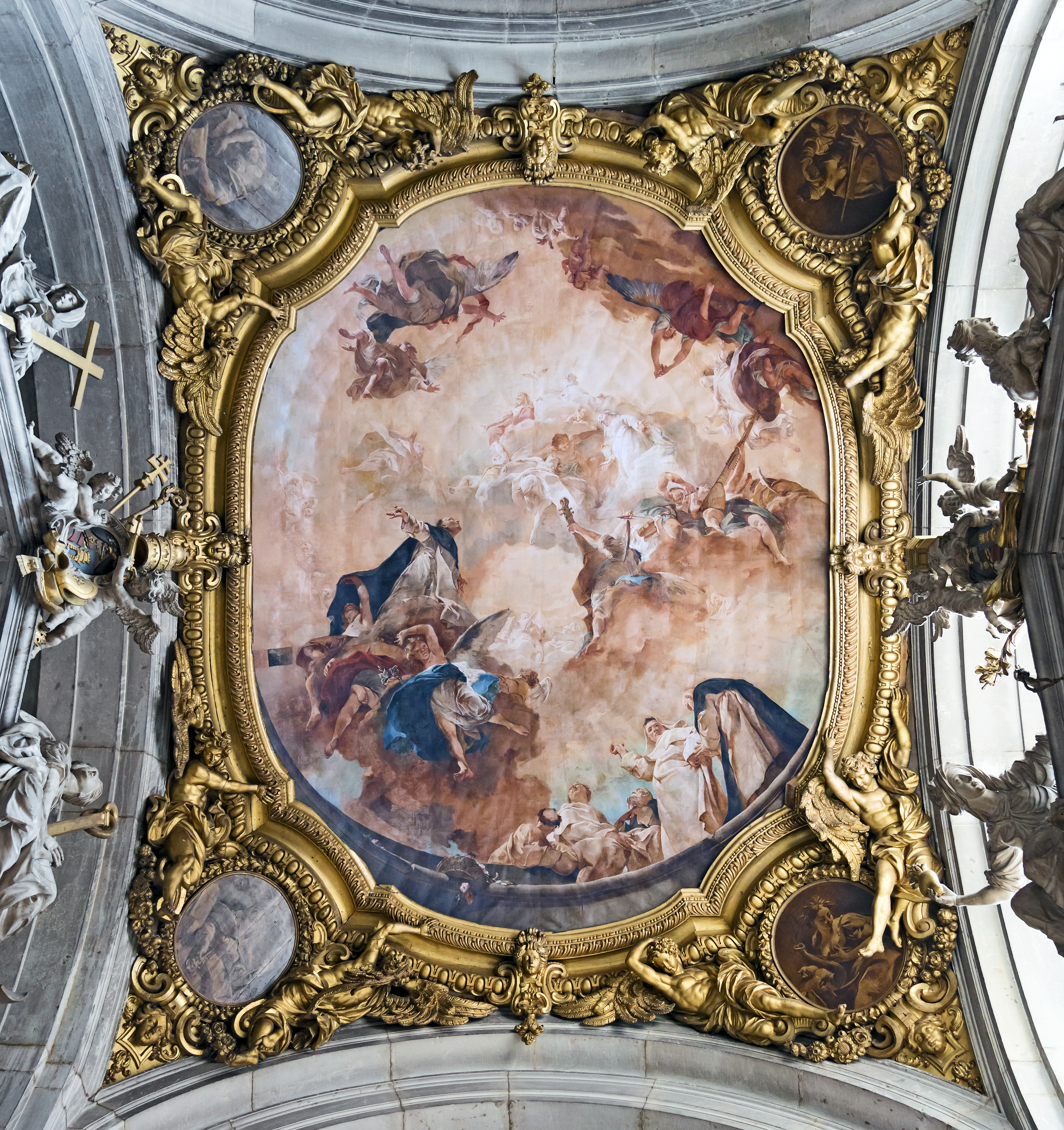
Glory of St Dominic, Santi Giovanni e Paolo, Venice

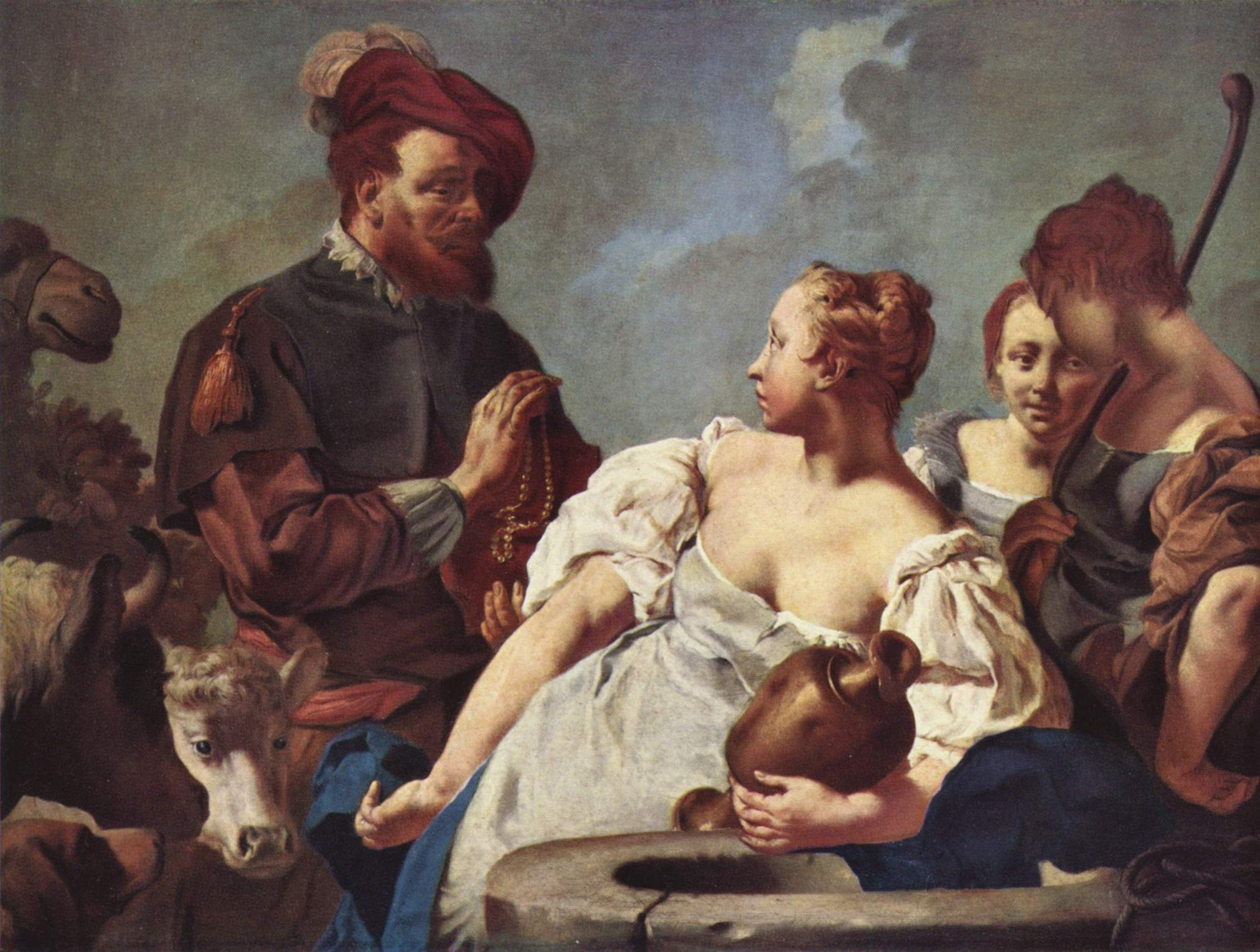
Rebecca at the Well, Pinacoteca di Brera, Milan

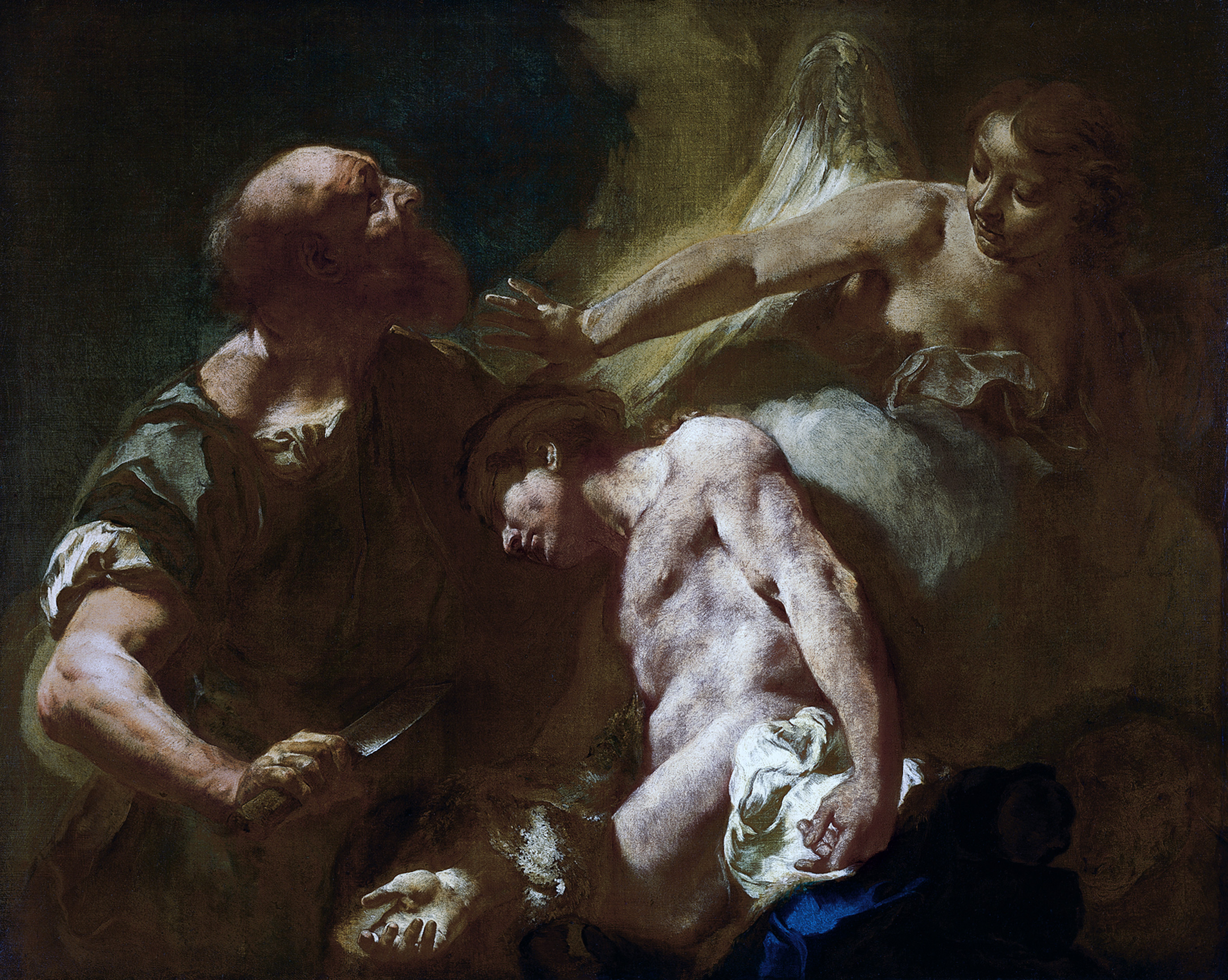
The Sacrifice of Isaac, Thyssen-Bornemisza Collection Foundation, Barcelona

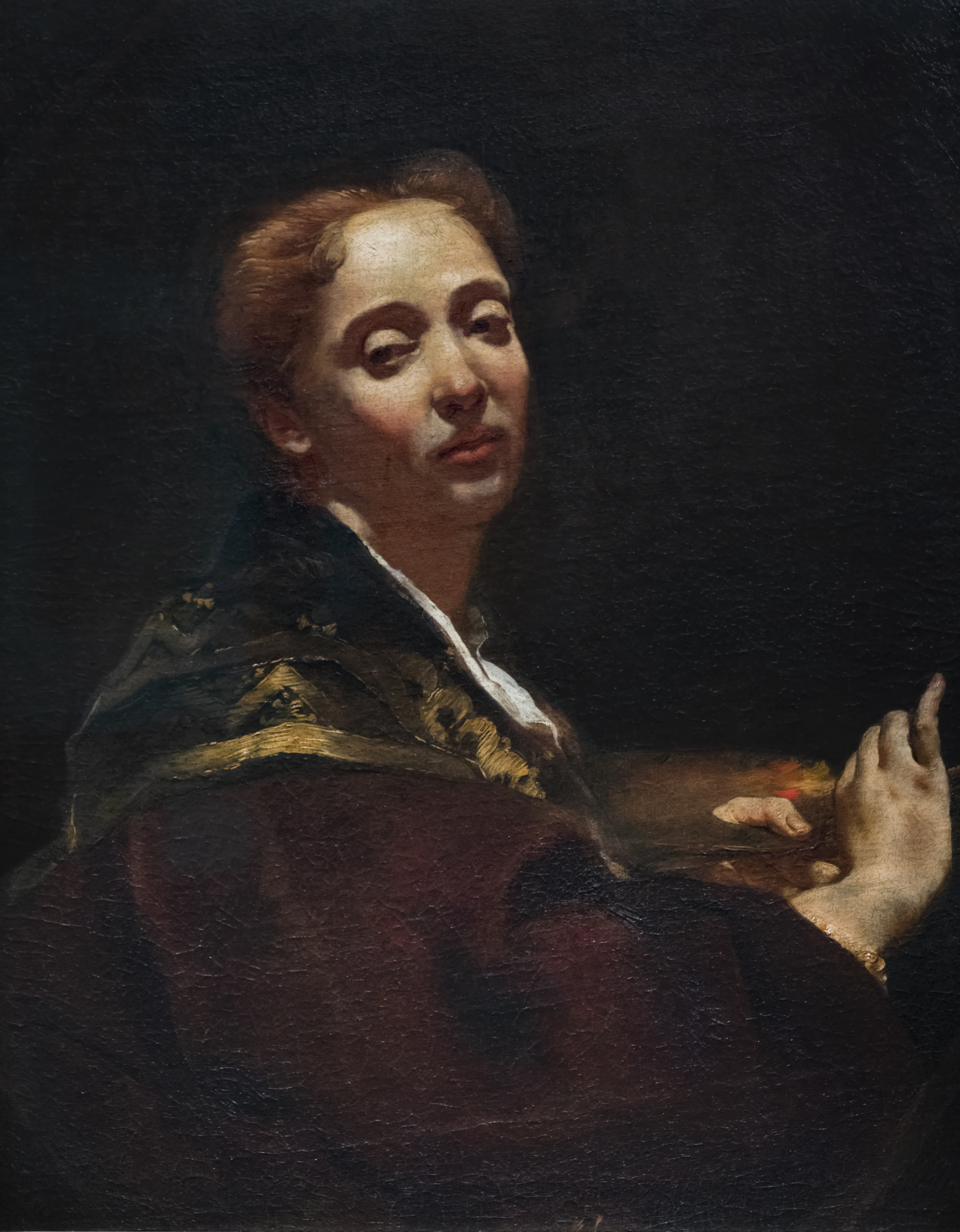
Portrait of Giulia Lama (c. 1715-1720), Thyssen-Bornemisza Museum, Madrid

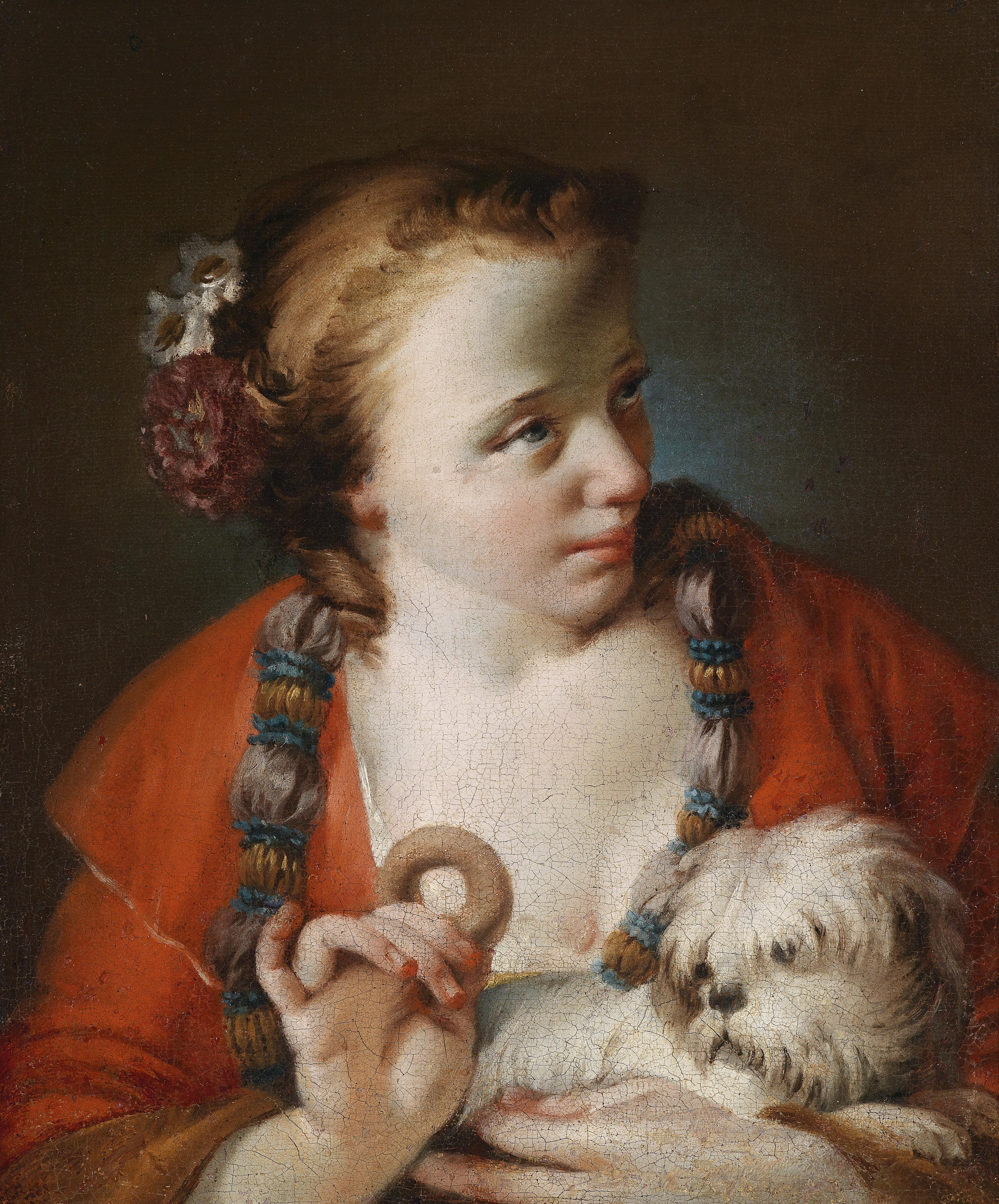
Young woman with Dog, priv. col.

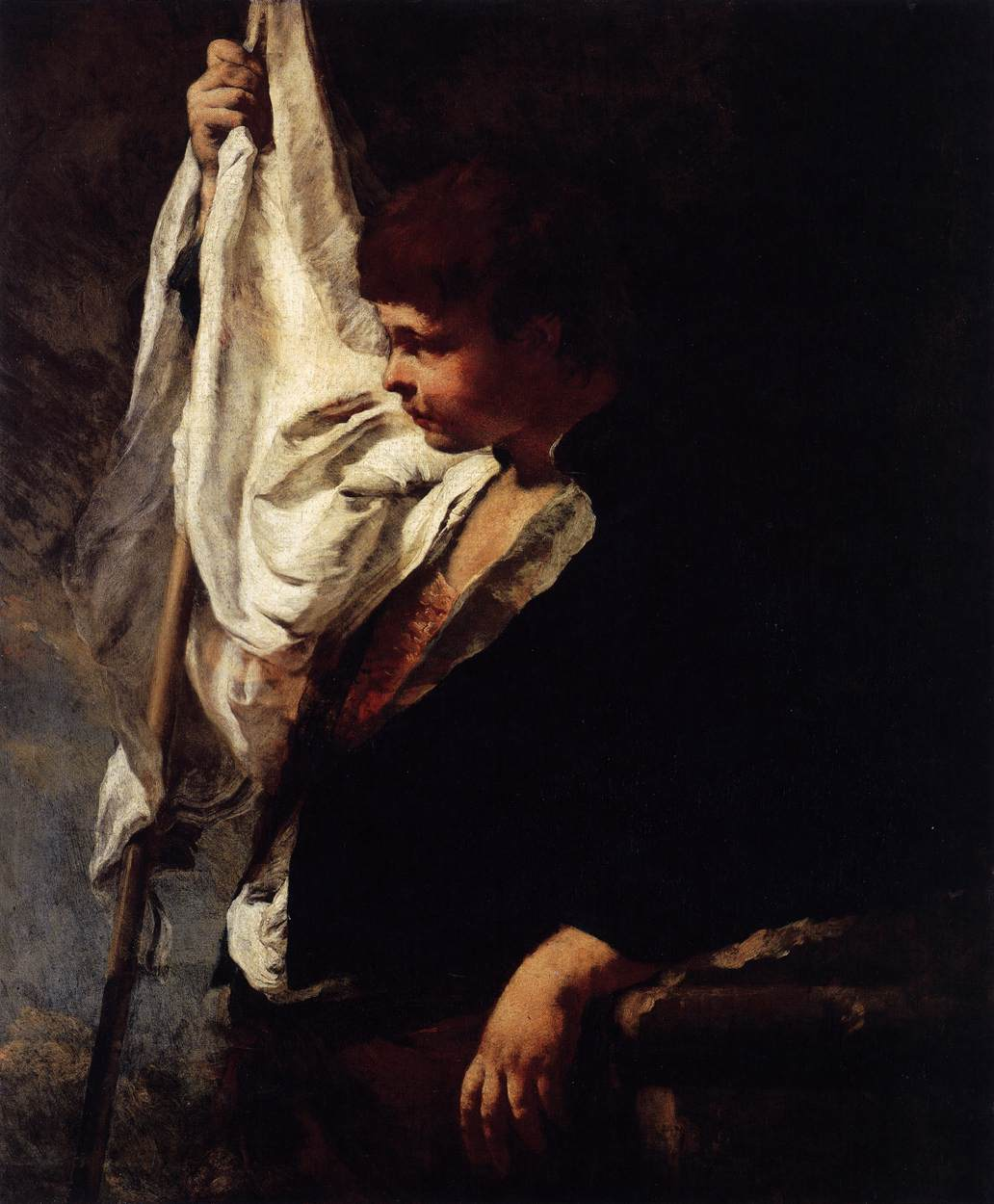
Young Ensign (c. 1742), Gemäldegalerie Alte Meister, Dresden

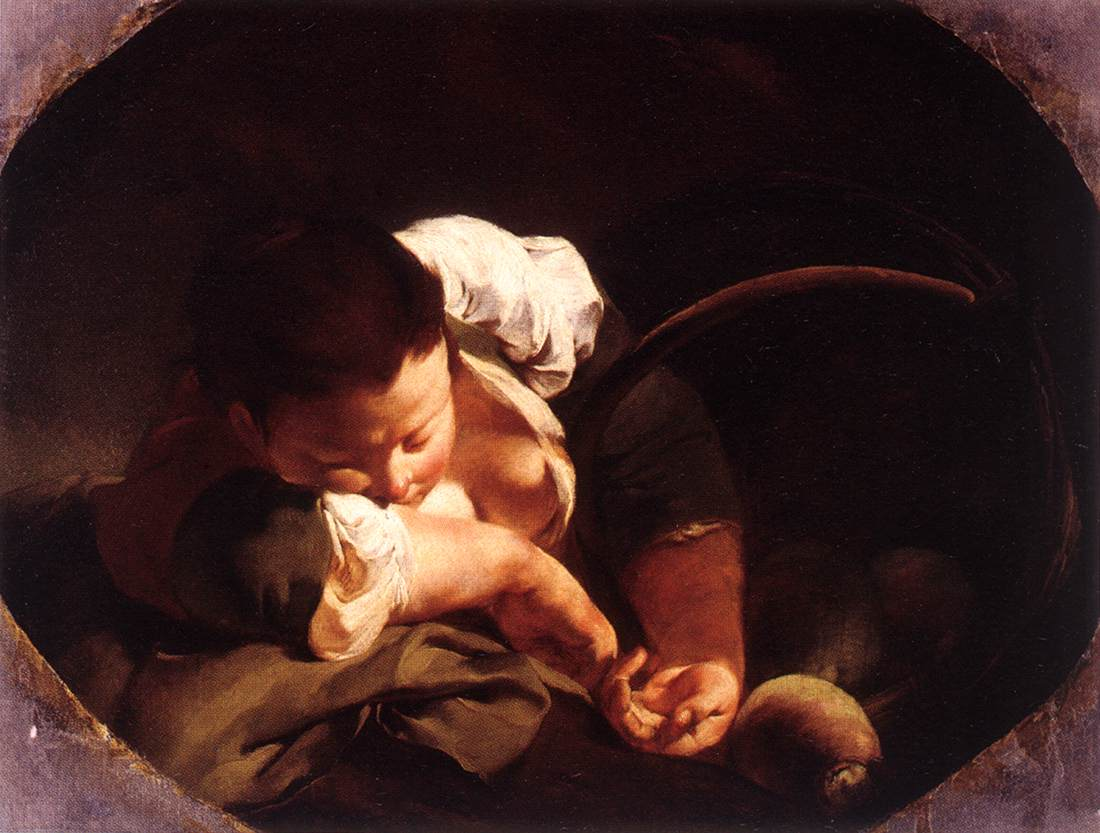
Peasant Girl Asleep (1720-1722), Residenzgalerie, Salzburg

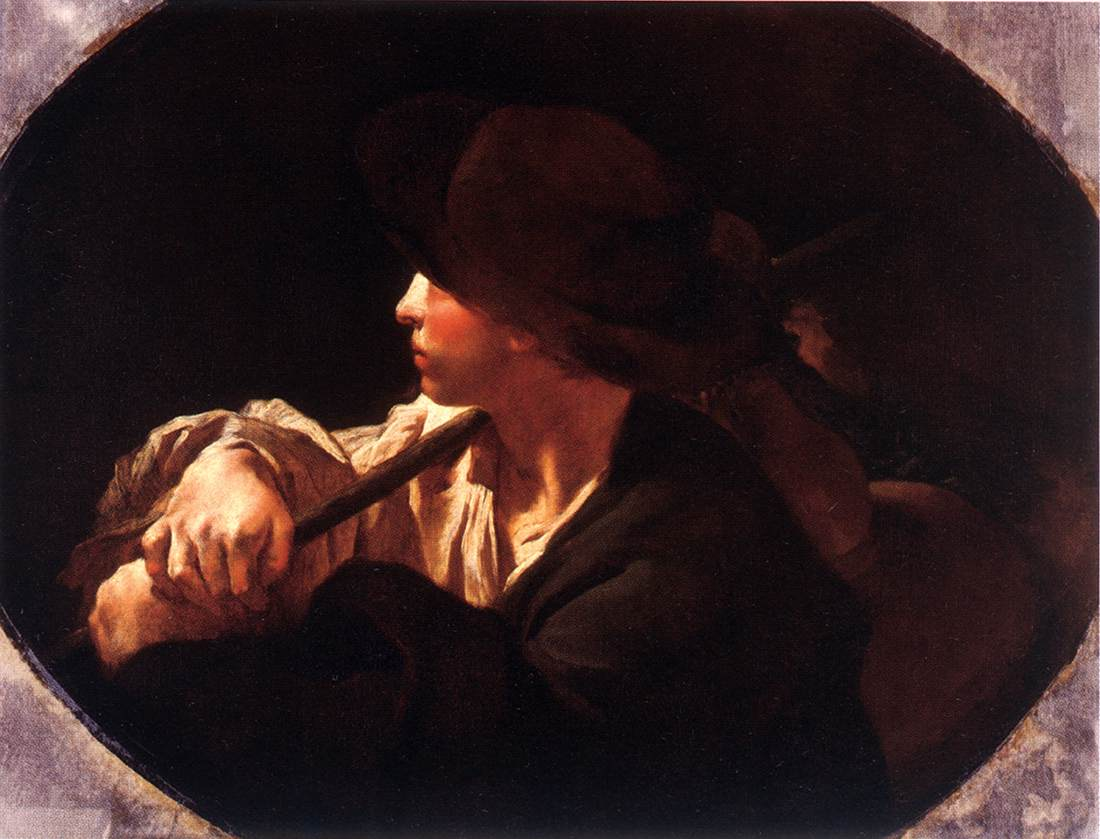
Shepherd Boy (1720-1722), Residenzgalerie, Salzburg

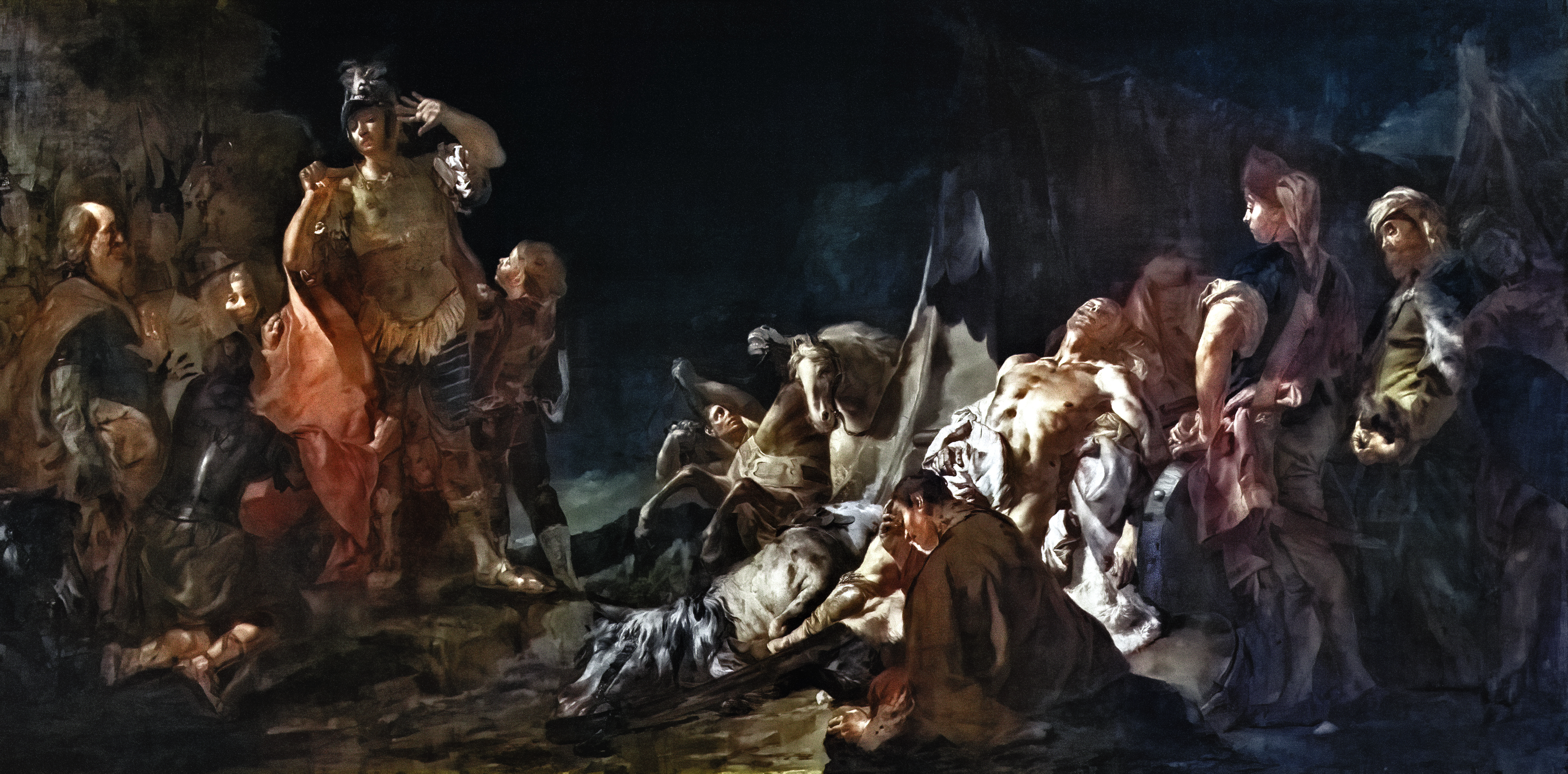
The Death of Darius (1745), Ca' Rezzonico, Venice

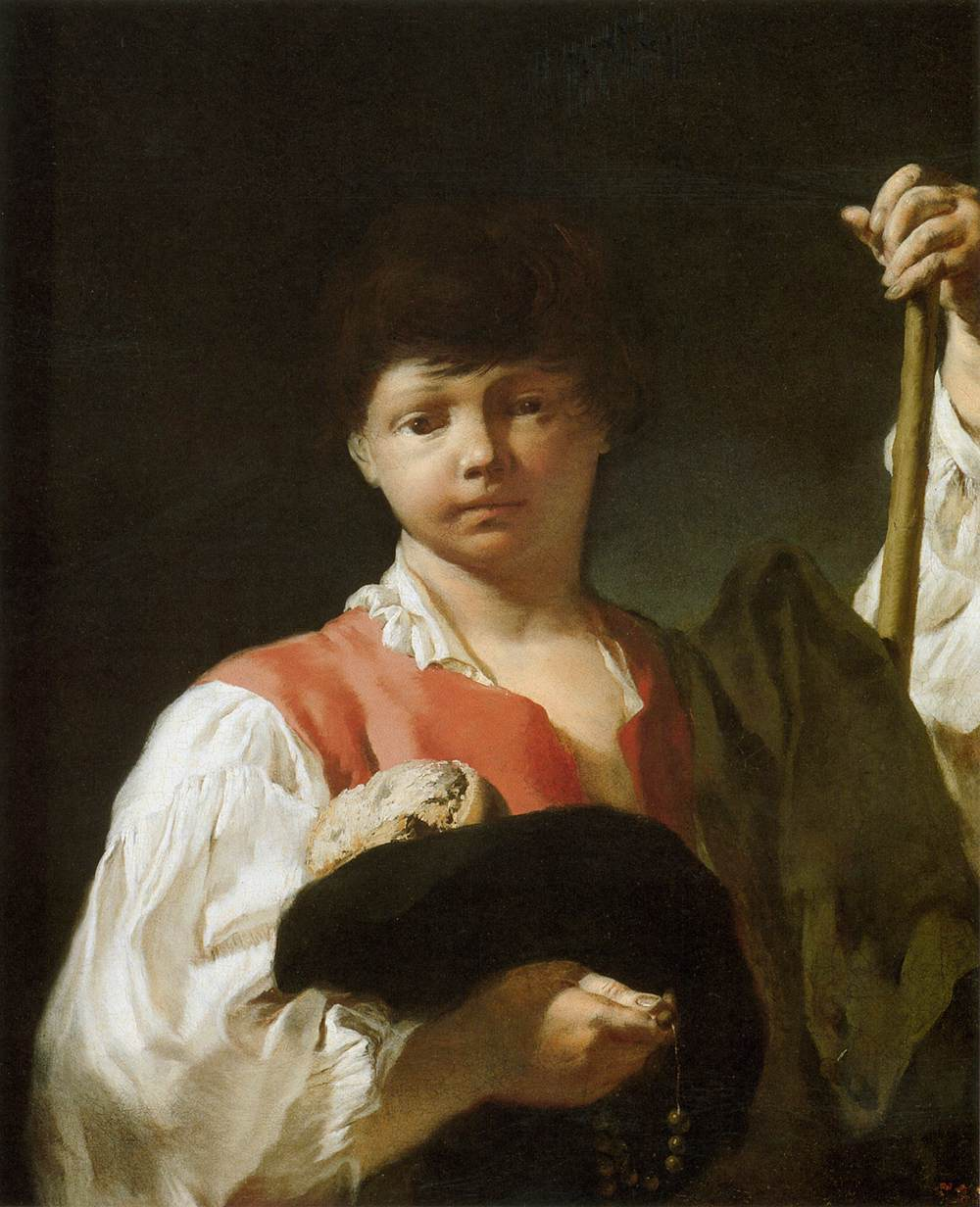
Beggar boy (1725–30), oil on canvas, Art Institute of Chicago

== Bibliography ==
- Mariuz, Adriano (2003). "Piazzetta, Giovanni Battista". Grove Art Online. Oxford University Press. doi:10.1093/oao/9781884446054.013.90000370804.
- Giovanni Battista Piazzetta at the Encyclopædia Britannica
- Wittkower, Rudolf (1993). Art and Architecture Italy, 1600-1750. Pelican History of Art. Harmondsworth: Penguin Books Ltd. pp. 481–82.
- Spike, John T. (1986). Giuseppe Maria Crespi and the Emergence of Genre Painting in Italy. Fort Worth: Kimbell Art Museum. p. 181. ISBN 978-0912804248.
