= Pietro Uberti =

Italian painter

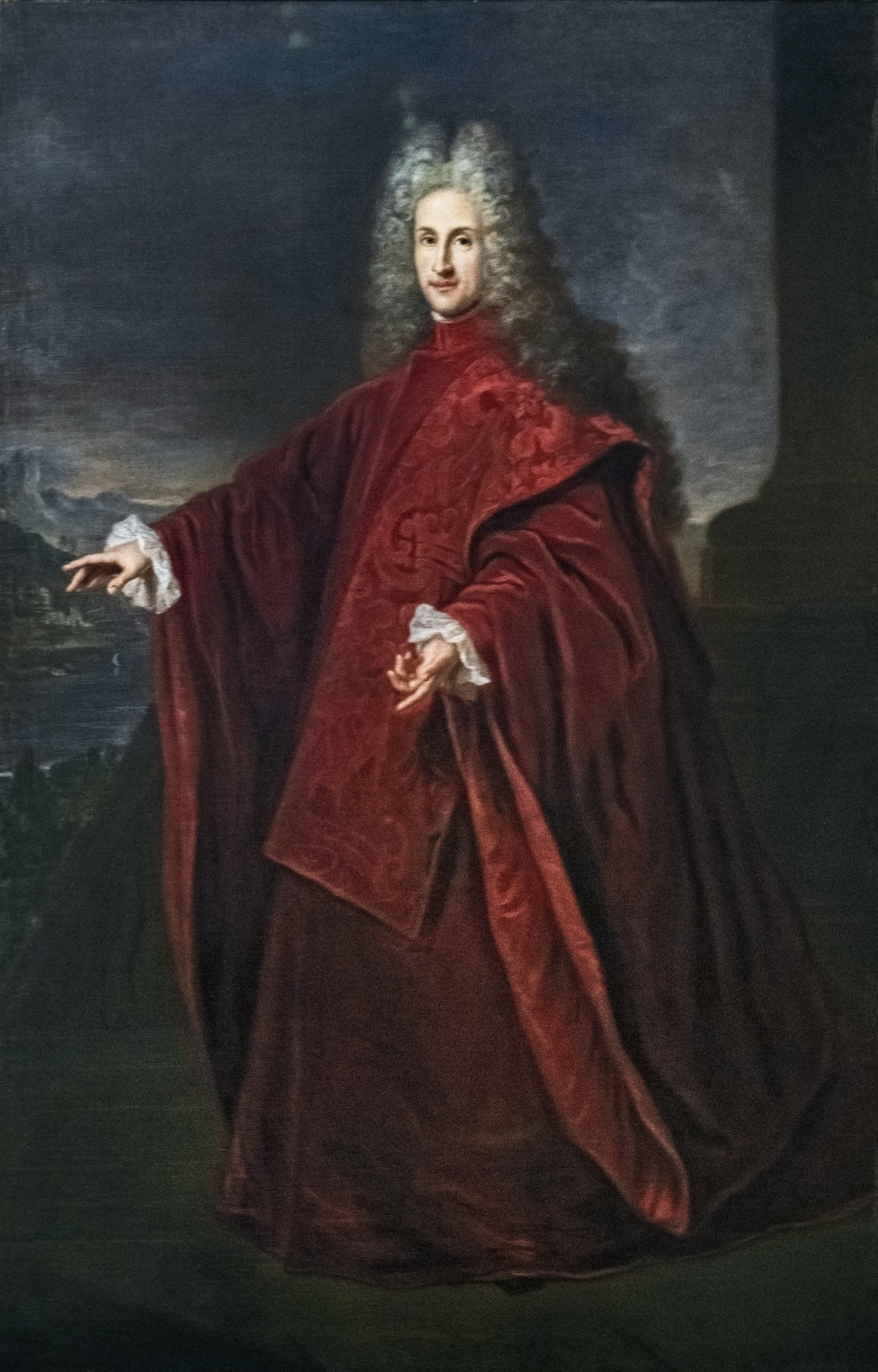
Giovanni Querini by Pietro Uberti Pinacoteca Querini Stampalia

Pietro Uberti (1671-1762) was an Italian painter, active in Venice, and painting portraits. He was son of Domenico, a mediocre painter. He was a contemporary of Nicolo Grassi. He painted a series of lawyers for the Ducal Palace, Venice.
