= Gianmario Baroni =

Italian ice hockey player

Personal information
- Nationality: Italian
- Born: 21 January 1910; Milan, Italy
- Died: 7 February 1952 (aged 42); Johannesburg, South Africa

Sport
- Sport: Ice hockey

Gianmario Mario Baroni (21 January 1910 – 7 February 1952) was an Italian ice hockey player. He competed in the men's tournament at the 1936 Winter Olympics.
