= Antonio Marinetti =

Italian painter

Antonio Marinetti, also called il Chiozzotro (born circa 1700) was an Italian painter, active in a late-Baroque style.

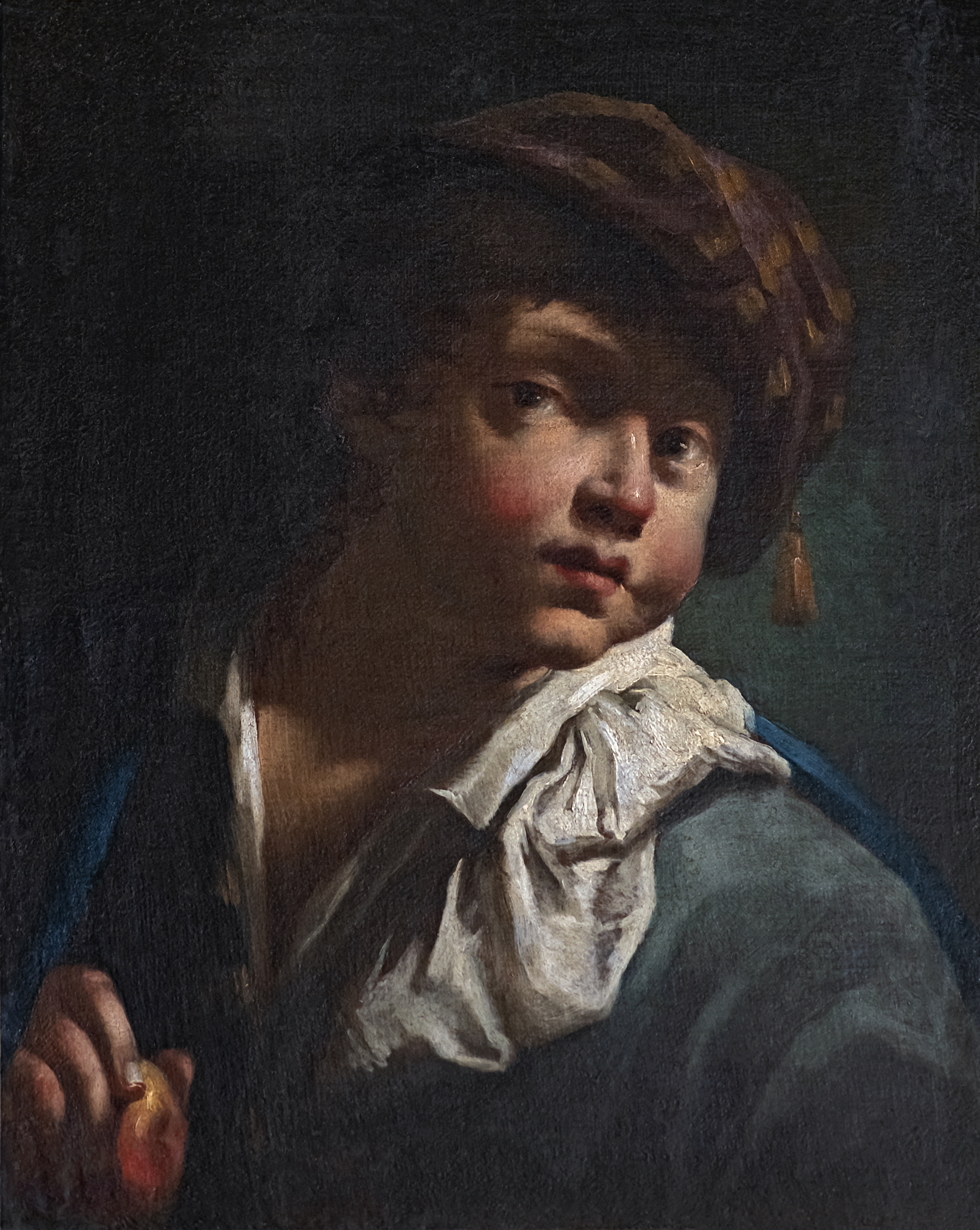
Ragazzo con mela - Ca' Rezzonico, Venice

== Biography ==
He was born in Chioggia. He was a pupil of Giovanni Battista Piazzetta. He painted the main altarpiece for the Church of Sant'Agostino in Treviso, depicting a Virgin and Child with St Augustine and the Blessed Girolamo Miani. Miani was one of the founders of the Order of Somaschi priests. He also painted for the same church, a Guardian Angel and Glory of St Joseph with Saint Anne and the Holy Family. For the church of San Lorenzo in Treviso, he painted a St Anthony Abbot.
