= Siro Baroni =

Italian painter (1678–1746)

- Born: 1678
- Died: December 31, 1746 (aged 68); Mantua

Siro Baroni (1678 – 31 December 1746) was an Italian painter of the late-Baroque period, active in Mantua.

== Biography ==
Of Mantuan origin, he lived in the 18th century and seems to have operated only in the hometown. Little is known of his biography, and many of his works were already lost at the beginning of the last century. In a chapel of the church of St. Ambrogio there existed his Christ Shown to the People, a work lost during the destruction of the temple at the end of the eighteenth century. According to ancient guides, in the basilica of Sant'Andrea in Mantua was Baroni's work as well a panel with the Blessed Virgin of the Rosary, and in the church of St. Camillo de Lellis the Saints Crispino and Crispiniano, no longer traceable now.

Unknown remains the fate of a painting mentioned by ancient sources as existing at the Mantuan church of St. Catherine and representing the Virgin on the Throne with the Child, St. Giuseppe, St. Aloysius Gonzaga and the Guardian Angel. Among the surviving works we can mention: the canvas, placed in the town church of St. Barnaba, depicting the Death of Saint Giuliana Falconieri (dated 1732, as shown in documents from the parish archives); the painting, in the parish church of Castelnuovo (Asola), representing a Madonna among the Saints Antonio and Imerio, signed and dated 1748; the canvas, located in the parish church of Acquanegra sul Chiese, depicting the Virgin among the Saints Luigi Gonzaga, Carlo Borromeo, Vincenzo Ferreri and Francesco Saverio, signed and dated 1751.

He was an associate at the Academy of Fine Arts of Mantua since 1754. He painted an Ecce Homo for the former chapel of Sant'Ambrogio (destroyed in 1789). Siro also painted Pietro and Andrea's call in 1760, displayed at the Biblioteca Teresiana in Mantua.
