= Rafaela Baroni =

Venezuelan artist (1935–2021)

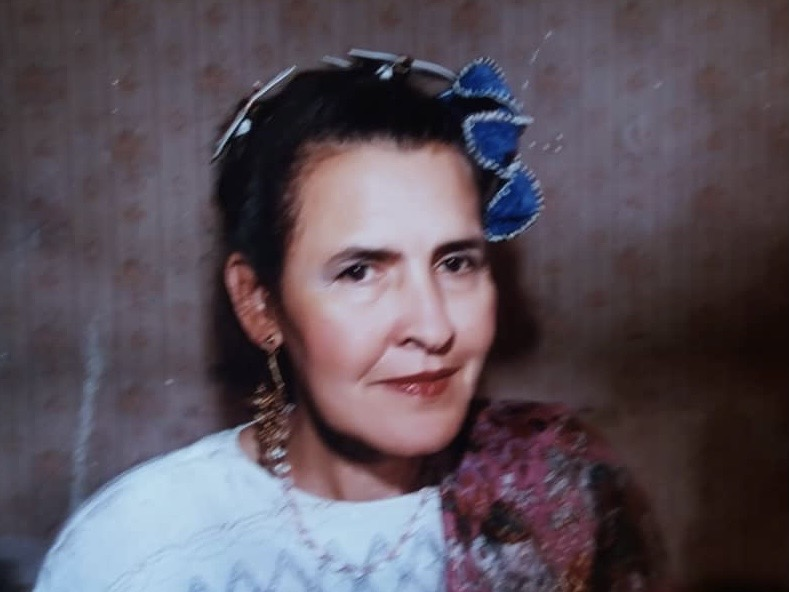
- Born: Rafaela Baroni Miliani; 1 November 1935; Mesa de Esnujaque, Urdaneta Municipality, Trujillo, Venezuela
- Died: 8 March 2021 (aged 85); Betijoque, Venezuela
- Awards: the National Prize of Plastic Arts in the Popular Art category (1989), the National Prize of Popular Culture (2005), the Order of Andrés Bello in First Class (2002)

Rafaela Baroni Miliani (1 November 1935 – 8 March 2021), also known by the pseudonym aleafaR, was a Venezuelan sculptor, plastic artist, painter, poet, Actor and singer, self-taught whose work is oriented to her religious faith. Among others, she received in 1989 the National Prize of Plastic Arts in the Popular Art category, and in 2005 the National Prize of Popular Culture, both awarded by the Venezuelan Ministry of Culture, as well as the Order of Andrés Bello in First Class in 2002. She is also recognized for her cultural contribution to the Trujillo state, due to the creation of the Museo del Espejo, the Ojos del Búho Cultural Center and the house museum El paraíso de Aleafar.
