= Giuseppe Baroni =

Italian engraver

Giuseppe Baroni (active 1720) was an Italian engraver of the 18th century. Together with Domenico Rosetti and Andrea Zucchi, he completed the prints for Il gran Teatro delle pitture e prospettive di Venezia, published in Venice in 1720 by Domenico Loviso in the Rialto. In this collection, the Madonna and child print by Nicolas Poussin and the Polyphemus by Pompeo Battoni are attributed to Baroni.

Baroni resided at Venice. He engraved some large plates from the paintings of the Venetian masters; among which is a print representing the Crucifixion, with Angels, and St. John and St. Mary Magdalene at foot of the Cross.

His daughter Elena was a copper engraver.
